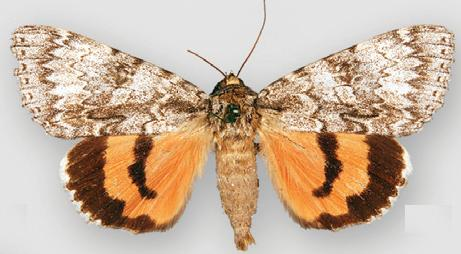
- Semirelict underwing (C. semirelicta); Imago of the pura form from above

Scientific classification
- Kingdom: Animalia
- Phylum: Arthropoda
- Clade: Pancrustacea
- Class: Insecta
- Order: Lepidoptera
- Superfamily: Noctuoidea
- Family: Erebidae
- Tribe: Catocalini
- Genus: Catocala; Schrank, 1802

Type species
- Phalaena nupta Linnaeus, 1767

Diversity
- About 270 species

Synonyms
- Numerous, see text

= Catocala =

Genus of moths

Catocala is a generally Holarctic genus of moths in the family Erebidae. The genus was erected by Franz von Paula Schrank in 1802. The moths are commonly known as underwing moths or simply underwings. These terms are sometimes used for a few related moths, but usually – especially when used in plural, not as part of a species name – they are used to refer to Catocala only.

Of the more than 250 known species, slightly less than half are found in North America – mostly in the United States – while the rest occur in Eurasia. About one-fifth (almost 30) of these species are native to Europe. A few species occur in the northern Neotropics and Indomalaya.

== Description and ecology ==
Most species of Catocala have medium to large adults, cryptically coloured except for the hindwings, which are marked with stripes in orange, red, white, or even blue. In some, the hindwings are mostly blackish. Unlike what the common name "underwings" seems to suggest, the colour is brightest on the upperside. However, the bright hindwings are not visible at rest, being hidden under the dull forewings – hence the name. Due to their diversity and variety of colors and patterns, underwing moths are popular with collectors of Lepidoptera.

In, The Fauna of British India, Including Ceylon and Burma: Moths Volume II, the genus described as follows.

Palpi reaching just above vertex of head, the 2nd joint thickly scaled; antennae of male fasciculated; thorax smoothly scaled; abdomen with dorsal ridges of coarse hair on proximal segments, which are sometimes developed into tufts; fore tibia more or less hairy; hind tibia spined. Fore wing with the apex nearly rectangular; the cilia crenulate. Hind wing with the cilia crenulate; vein 5 from below center of discocellulars. Larva with four pairs of abdominal prolegs.

It is believed that the bright colors, arranged in usually roughly concentric markings, at a casual glance resemble the eyes of a predatory animal, such as a cat. An underwing moth, well camouflaged in its daytime resting spot on a tree trunk or branch, will suddenly flash open the hindwings when disturbed. A bird or other small predator that is not used to this display is likely to be frightened, allowing the moth to escape. However, unlike some other bright-colored moths which are bad-tasting or even poisonous to predators, underwing moths are well palatable at least to some birds (e.g. the blue jay, Cyanocitta cristata). To assist in avoiding nocturnal predators such as bats, these moths also possess (like many of their relatives) fairly well-developed hearing organs.

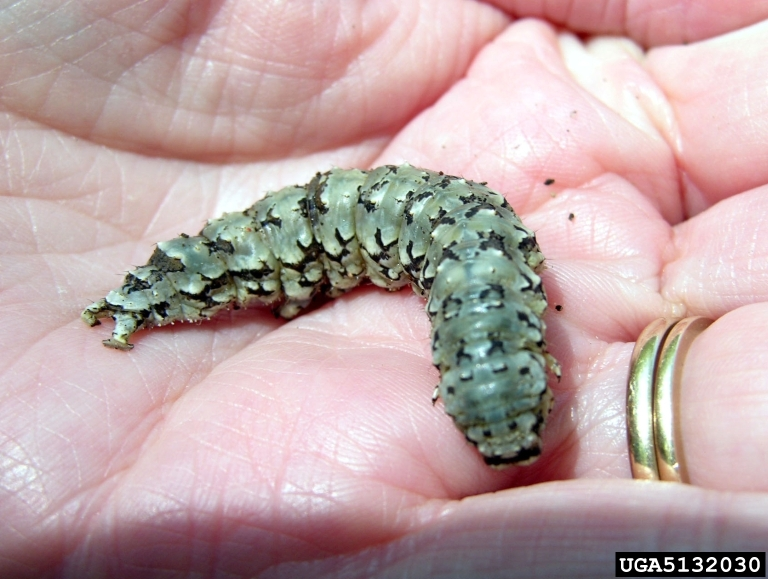
Caterpillar of the beloved underwing (C. ilia)

The caterpillars of most species feed on the leaves of woody plants, usually trees but sometimes shrubs. Typical food plants are Fagales of the families Betulaceae, Fagaceae and Juglandaceae – mainly hickory (Carya), oak (Quercus) and walnut tree (Juglans) species, as well as others such as alder (Alnus), beech (Fagus), birch (Betula) and chestnut (Castanea). The caterpillars of numerous Old World and some North American species feed on the Salicaceae Populus (poplars) and Salix (willows), which belong to the Malpighiales. Less common larval food plants of Catocala are for example elms (Ulmus) and various Rosaceae of the Rosales, Tilia (linden and basswood) of the Malvales, or some Fabaceae of the Fabales; as the preceding, these all belong to the Fabidae lineage of rosid eudicots. More unusually, underwing moth caterpillars have also been found to feed on such plants as maple (Acer) which belongs to a distant lineage of rosids, as well as on such plants as ash trees (Fraxinus) and blueberries (Vaccinium) which are asterids and quite unrelated to the other food plants by eudicot standards.

The adults are predominantly nocturnal, flying from shortly after dusk right up to daybreak. They are generally most active about two hours after nightfall. However, several if not all species of underwing moths have a second activity period exactly around noon, during which they are also regularly found on the wing for about 1–2 hours each day.

The genus name Catocala roughly means "beautiful hindwings". It is a combination of two Ancient Greek words, kato (κάτω, "the rear one" or "the lower one"), and kalos (καλός, "beautiful").

== Classification ==
There are over 250 species in this genus. The species of Catocala are here divided into a Eurasian group, and another one which is found in North America. This does not imply actual relationships; it is mainly done to more conveniently deal with the large number of species. Still, it is not unlikely at all that the groups consist at least to some extent of closely related species.

There are several cryptic species complexes in Catocala, e.g. the group around the Delilah underwing (C. delilah); these and other hitherto unknown species are still being discovered and described in some numbers. Thus, resolving the phylogeny and taxonomy of the underwing moths is an ongoing effort, which has made (as of 2011) little progress. In the scientific literature, smaller subdivisions into putatively related species are sometimes applied, but there is no consistent and widely accepted taxonomic treatment for the genus as a whole.

=== Synonyms ===
Several distinct genera have formally been proposed for splitting from Catocala, but these are all treated here as junior synonyms. These synonyms and other invalid names of Catocala are:

- Andreusia Hampson, 1913 (unjustified emendation)
- Andrewsia Grote, 1882
- Astiodes (lapsus)
- Astiotes Hübner, 1823
- Belpharidia (lapsus)
- Bihemena Beck, 1966
- Blephara Ochsenheimer, 1816 (unavailable)
- Blepharidia Hübner, 1822
- Blepharonia Hübner, 1823 (unavailable)
- Blepharonia Hübner, 1825
- Blepharum Hübner, 1806 (rejected)
- Catabapta Hulst, 1884
- Catacola (lapsus)
- Catocalla (lapsus)
- Convercala Beck, 1966
- Corisce Hübner, 1823
- Corisee (lapsus)
- Divercala Beck, 1966
- Ephesia Hübner, 1818
- Eucala Beck, 1966
- Eucora Hübner, 1823
- Eunetis Hübner, 1823
- Hemigeometra Haworth, 1809
- Koraia Nye, 1975
- Lamprosia Hübner, [1821]
- Lamprosia Hübner, 1827 (non Hübner, [1821]: preoccupied)
- Metacala Beck, 1966
- Mormonia Hübner, 1823
- Mormosia (lapsus)
- Optocala Beck, 1966
- Promonia Beck, 1966
- Puercala Beck, 1966
- Reticcala Beck, 1966
- Simplicala Beck, 1966

=== Palearctic species ===
- Catocala abacta Staudinger, 1900
- Catocala abamita Bremer & Grey, 1853 (including C. scortum)
- Catocala actaea Felder & Rogenhofer, 1874
- Catocala adultera Ménétries, 1856
- Catocala aenigma Sheljuzhko, 1943
- Catocala aestimabilis Staudinger, 1892
- Catocala afghana Swinhoe, 1885
- Catocala agitatrix Graeser, 1889 (including C. mabella)
- Catocala amabilis Bang-Haas, 1907
- Catocala amnonfreidbergi Kravchenko et al., 2008
- Catocala ariana Vartian, 1964
- Catocala armandi Poujade, 1888 (including C. davidi)
- Catocala artobolevskiji Sheljuzhko, 1943
- Catocala bella Butler, 1877 (including C. serenides)
- Catocala bokhaica (Kononenko, 1979)
- Catocala borthi Saldaitis, Ivinskis, Floriani & Babics, 2012
- Catocala brandti Hacker & Kautt, 1999
- Catocala butleri Leech, 1900
- Catocala catei Weisert, 1998
- Catocala chenyixini Ishizuka, 2011
- Catocala columbina Leech, 1900
- Catocala coniuncta (Esper, 1787) – Minsmere crimson underwing
- Catocala connexa Wileman, 1911
- Catocala contemnenda Staudinger, 1891
- Catocala conversa (Esper, 1787)
- Catocala danilovi Bang-Haas, 1927
- Catocala dariana Sviridov, Speidel, Reshöft, 1996
- Catocala davidi Oberthür, 1881
- Catocala deducta Eversmann, 1843
- Catocala dejeani Mell, 1936 (sometimes in C. kuangtungensis)
- Catocala desiderata Staudinger, 1888
- Catocala detrita Warren, 1913
- Catocala deuteronympha Staudinger, 1861
- Catocala dilecta Hübner, [1808] (type of Astiotes)
- Catocala disjuncta (Geyer, 1828)
- Catocala dissimilis Bremer, 1861 (including C. nigricans)
- Catocala distorta Butler, 1889
- Catocala diversa (Geyer, 1826)
- Catocala doerriesi Staudinger, 1888
- Catocala dotatoides Poole, 1989
- Catocala dula Bremer, 1861
- Catocala duplicata Butler, 1885
- Catocala editarevayae Kravchenko et al., 2008
- Catocala electa (Vieweg, 1790) – rosy underwing
- Catocala ella Butler, 1877
- Catocala ellamajor Ishizuka, 2010
- Catocala elocata (Esper, 1787) – French red underwing
- Catocala eminens Staudinger, 1892
- Catocala eutychea Treitschke, 1835
- Catocala flavescens Hampson, 1894
- Catocala florianii Saldaitis & Ivinskis, 2008
- Catocala formosana Okano, 1958
- Catocala fraxini (Linnaeus, 1758) – blue underwing, Clifden nonpareil (type of Hemigeometra)
- Catocala fredi Bytinsky-Salz & Brandt, 1937
- Catocala fugitiva Warren, 1914
- Catocala fulminea (Scopoli, 1763) (type of Ephesia)
- Catocala fuscinupta Hampson, 1913
- Catocala gansan Ishizuka & M. Wang, 2013
- Catocala giuditta Schawerda, 1934
- Catocala haitzi Bang-Haas, 1936
- Catocala hariti Ishizuka & Ohshima, 2002
- Catocala helena Eversmann, 1856
- Catocala hoenei Mell, 1936
- Catocala hoferi Ishizuka & Ohshima, 2003
- Catocala hymenaea (Denis & Schiffermüller, 1775)
- Catocala hymenoides Draeseke, 1927
- Catocala hyperconnexa Sugi, 1965
- Catocala inconstans Butler, 1889
- Catocala infasciata Mell, 1936
- Catocala intacta Leech, 1889
- Catocala invasa Leech, 1900
- Catocala jansseni A. E. Prout, 1924
- Catocala jonasii Butler, 1877
- Catocala jouga Ishizuka, 2003
- Catocala juncta Staudinger, 1889
- Catocala jyoka Ishizuka, 2006
- Catocala kaki Ishizuka, 2003
- Catocala kasenko Ishizuka, 2007
- Catocala koreana Staudinger, 1892
- Catocala kotschubeyi Sheljuzhko, 1927
- Catocala kuangtungensis Mell, 1931
- Catocala kusnezovi Püngeler, 1914
- Catocala lara Bremer, 1861
- Catocala largeteaui Oberthür, 1881
- Catocala laura Speidel, Ivinskis & Saldaitis, 2008
- Catocala leechi Hampson, 1913
- Catocala lehmanni Speidel, Ivinskis & Saldaitis, 2008
- Catocala lesbia Christoph, 1887
- Catocala longipalpis Mell, 1936
- Catocala lupina Herrich-Schäffer, [1851]
- Catocala luscinia Brandt, 1938
- Catocala maculata Vincent, 1919
- Catocala mariana Rambur, 1858
- Catocala martyrum Oberthür, 1881
- Catocala maso Ishizuka, 2011
- Catocala mesopotamica
- Catocala mirifica Butler, 1877
- Catocala moltrechti Bang-Haas, 1927
- Catocala musmi (Hampson, 1913)
- Catocala naganoi Sugi, 1982
- Catocala nagioides (Wileman, 1924)
- Catocala naumanni Sviridov, 1996
- Catocala neglecta Staudinger
- Catocala neonympha Esper, 1805 (type of Eucora)
- Catocala nivea Butler, 1877
- Catocala nubila Butler, 1881
- Catocala nupta – red underwing
- Catocala nymphaea (Esper, 1787)
- Catocala nymphaeoides Herrich-Schäffer, 1852
- Catocala nymphagoga – oak yellow underwing
- Catocala oberthueri Austaut, 1879
- Catocala obscena Alphéraky, 1879
- Catocala ohshimai Ishizuka, 2001
- Catocala olgaorlovae Kravchenko et al., 2008
- Catocala optata (Godart, 1824)
- Catocala optima – Turanga underwing
- Catocala pacta (Linnaeus, 1758)
- Catocala paki Kishida, 1981
- Catocala patala Felder & Rogenhofer, 1874
- Catocala pataloides Mell, 1931
- Catocala persimilis Warren, 1888
- Catocala pirata
- Catocala praegnax Walker, 1858
- Catocala prolifica Walker, 1857
- Catocala promissa – light crimson underwing
- Catocala proxeneta Alphéraky, 1895
- Catocala pudica Moore, 1879
- Catocala pudica sabine Saldaitis, Pekarsky & Borth 2014
- Catocala puella
- Catocala puerpera (type of Eunetis)
- Catocala puerperoides
- Catocala remissa
- Catocala repudiata
- Catocala rhodosoma Röber, 1927
- Catocala seibaldi Saldaitis, Ivinskis & Borth, 2010 (including C. pseudoformosana)
- Catocala seiohbo
- Catocala separans
- Catocala separata
- Catocala sinyaevi Sviridov, 2004
- Catocala solntsevi
- Catocala sponsa – dark crimson underwing
- Catocala sponsalis
- Catocala stamensis Kishida & Suzuki, 2002
- Catocala streckeri
- Catocala sultana (sometimes in C. optata)
- Catocala svetlana Sviridov, 1997
- Catocala szechuena
- Catocala tapestrina Moore, 1882
- Catocala thomsoni A. E. Prout, 1924
- Catocala timur – Timur underwing
- Catocala tokui
- Catocala toropovi Saldaitis, Kons & Borth, 2014
- Catocala triphaenoides Oberthür, 1881
- Catocala uljanae Sinyaev, Saldaitis & Ivinskis, 2007
- Catocala viviannae
- Catocala weigerti Hacker, 1999
- Catocala wushensis
- Catocala xarippe Butler, 1877 (formerly in C. fulminea)
- Catocala xizangensis Chen, 1991

Comparison of Eurasian species

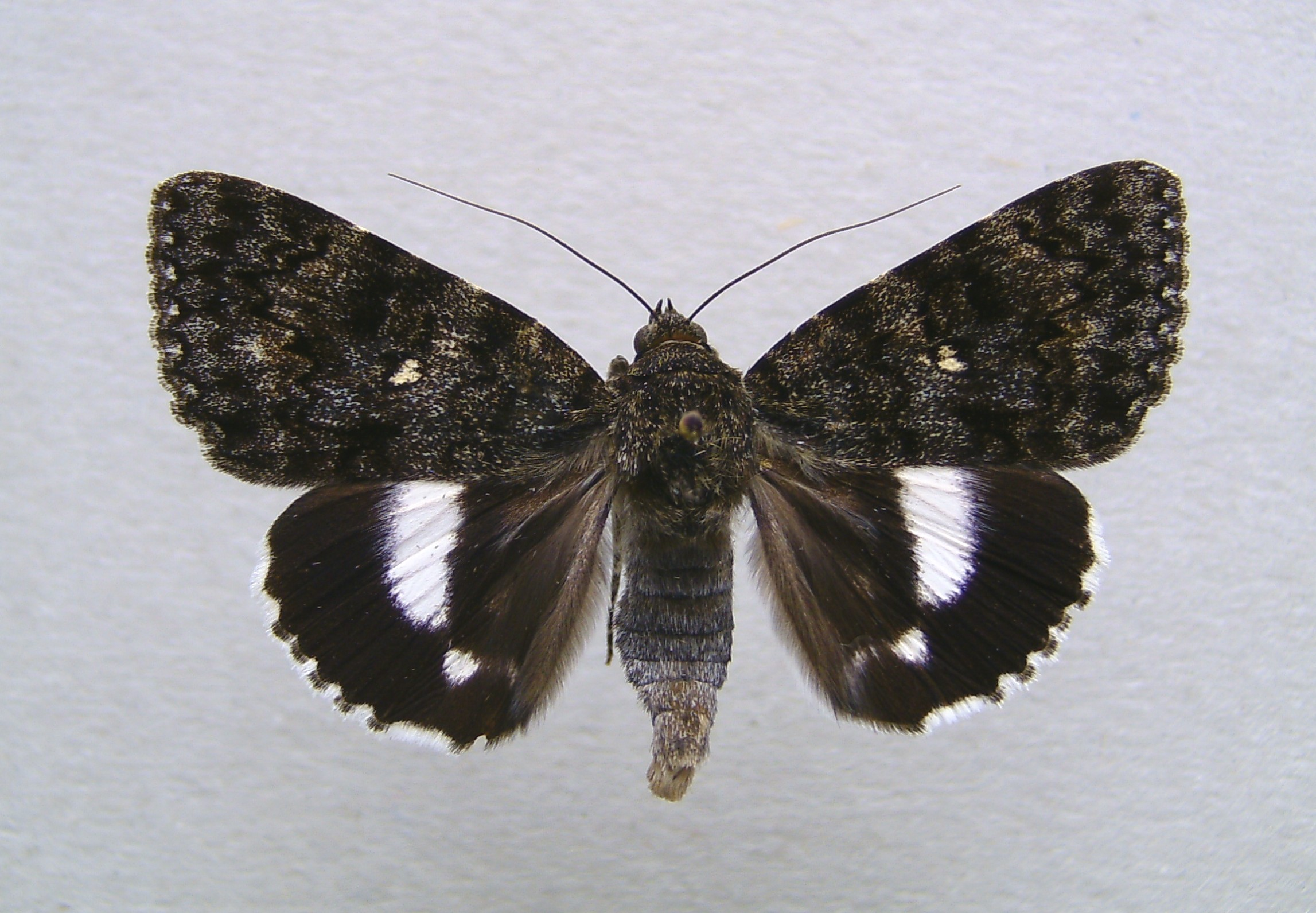
Catocala actaea

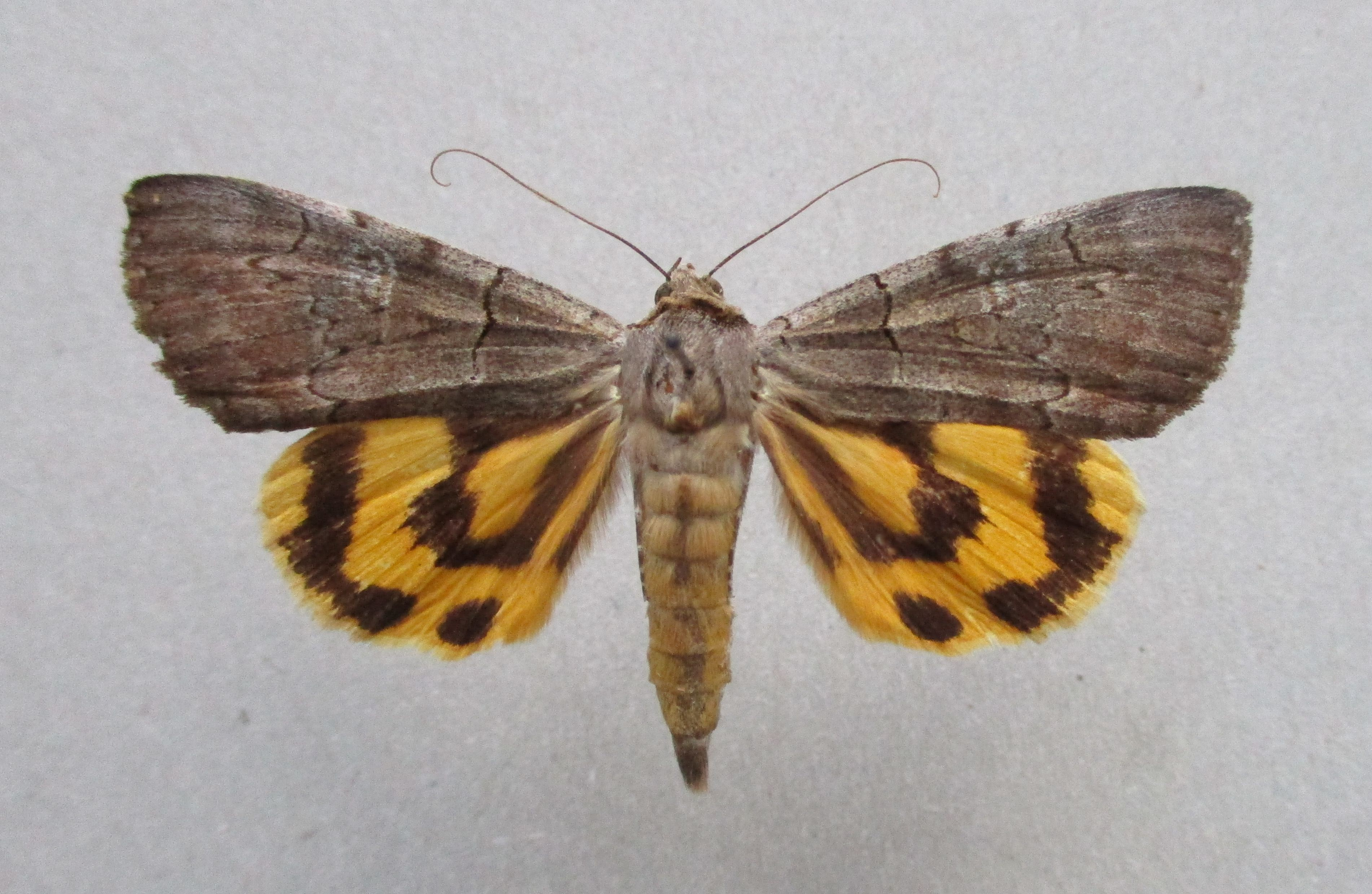
Catocala agitatrix

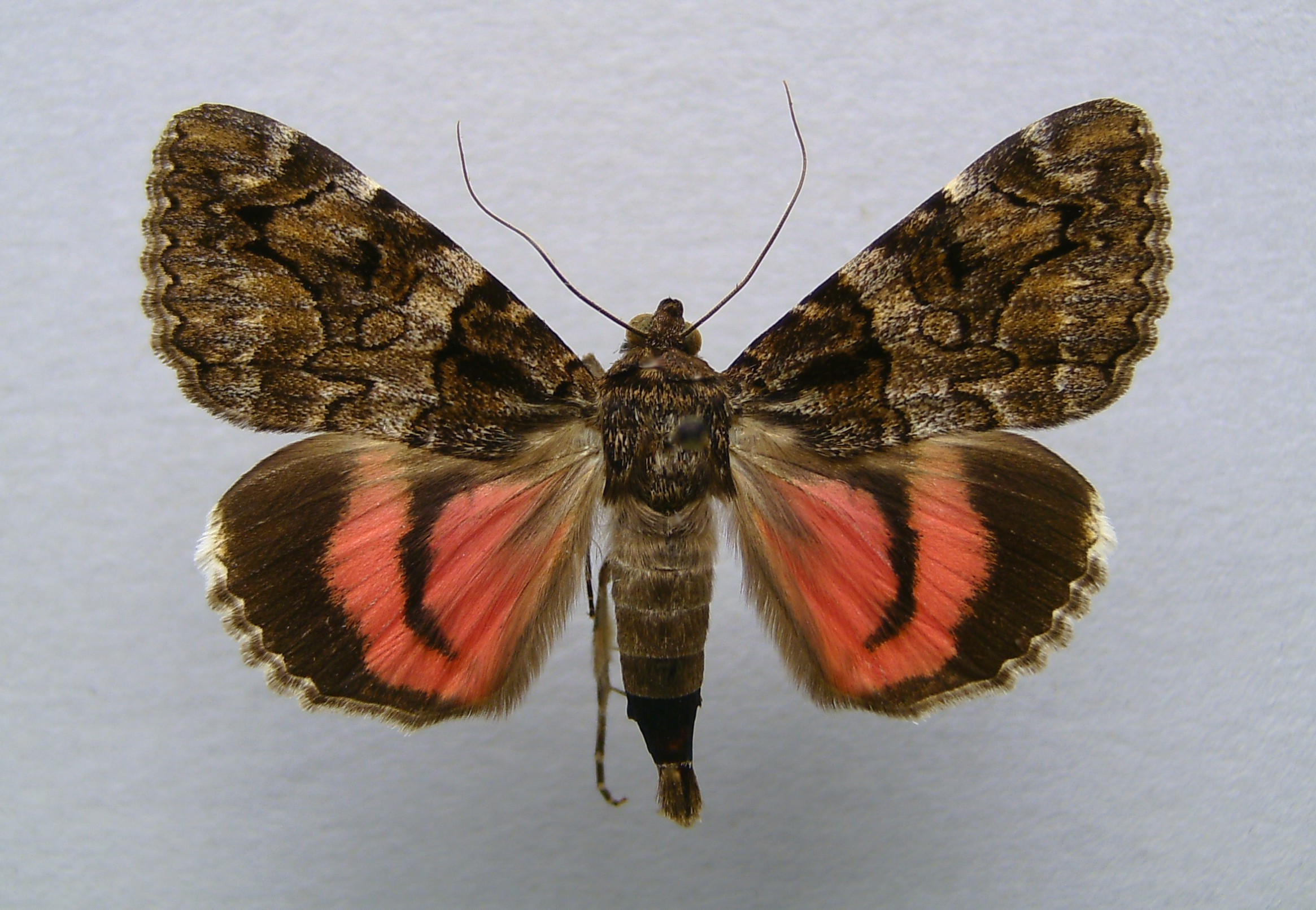
Catocala conjuncta

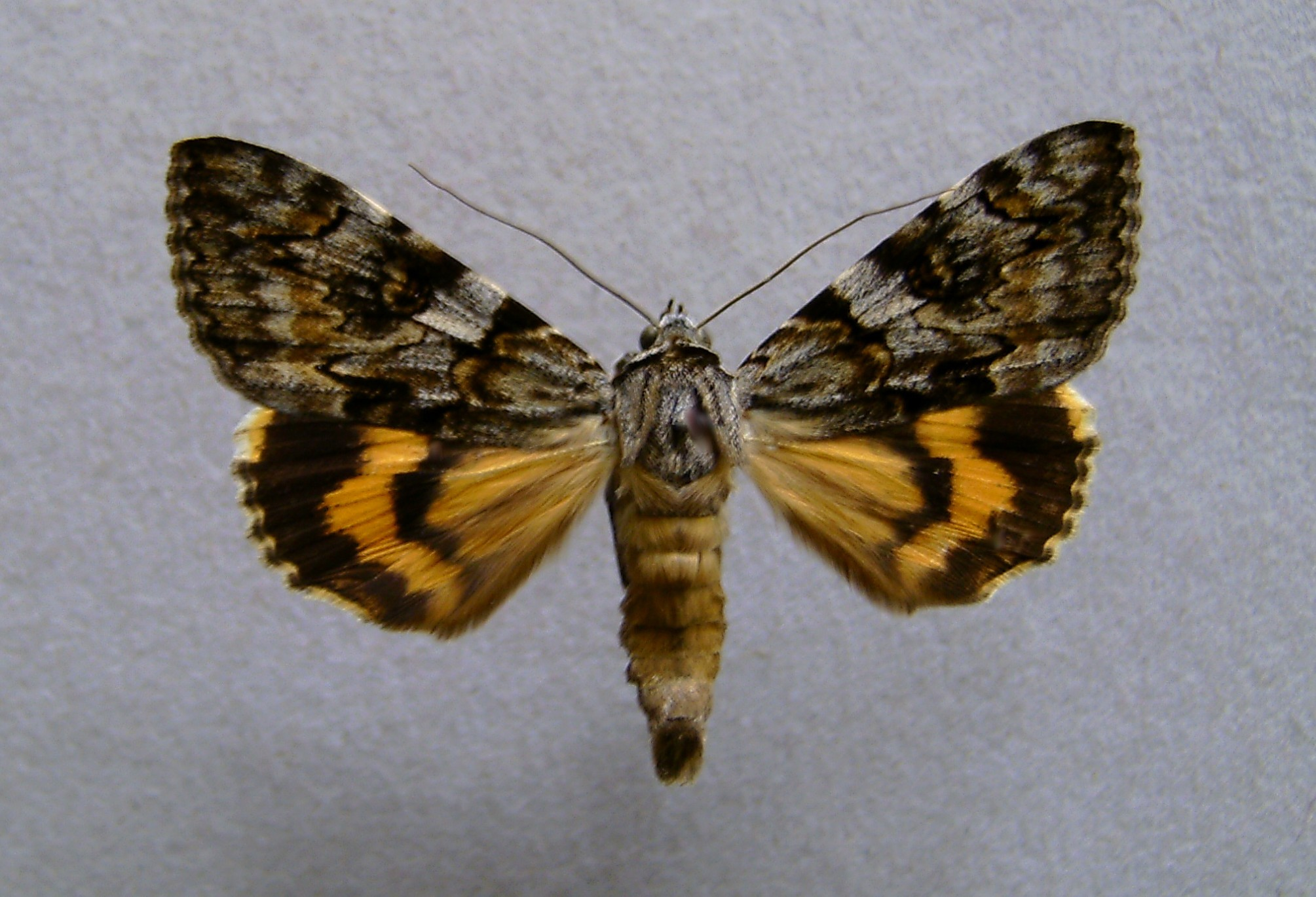
Catocala conversa

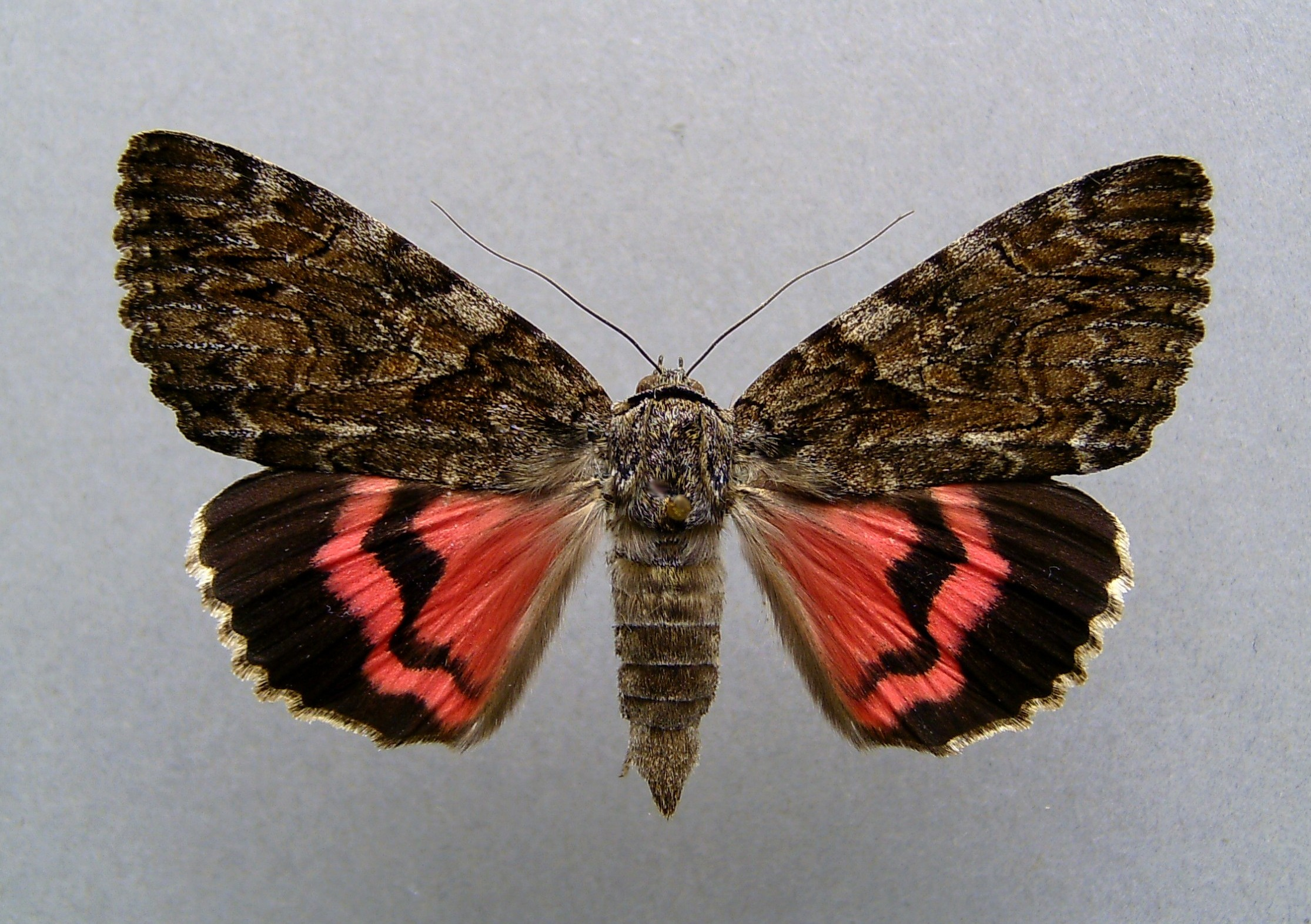
Catocala dilecta

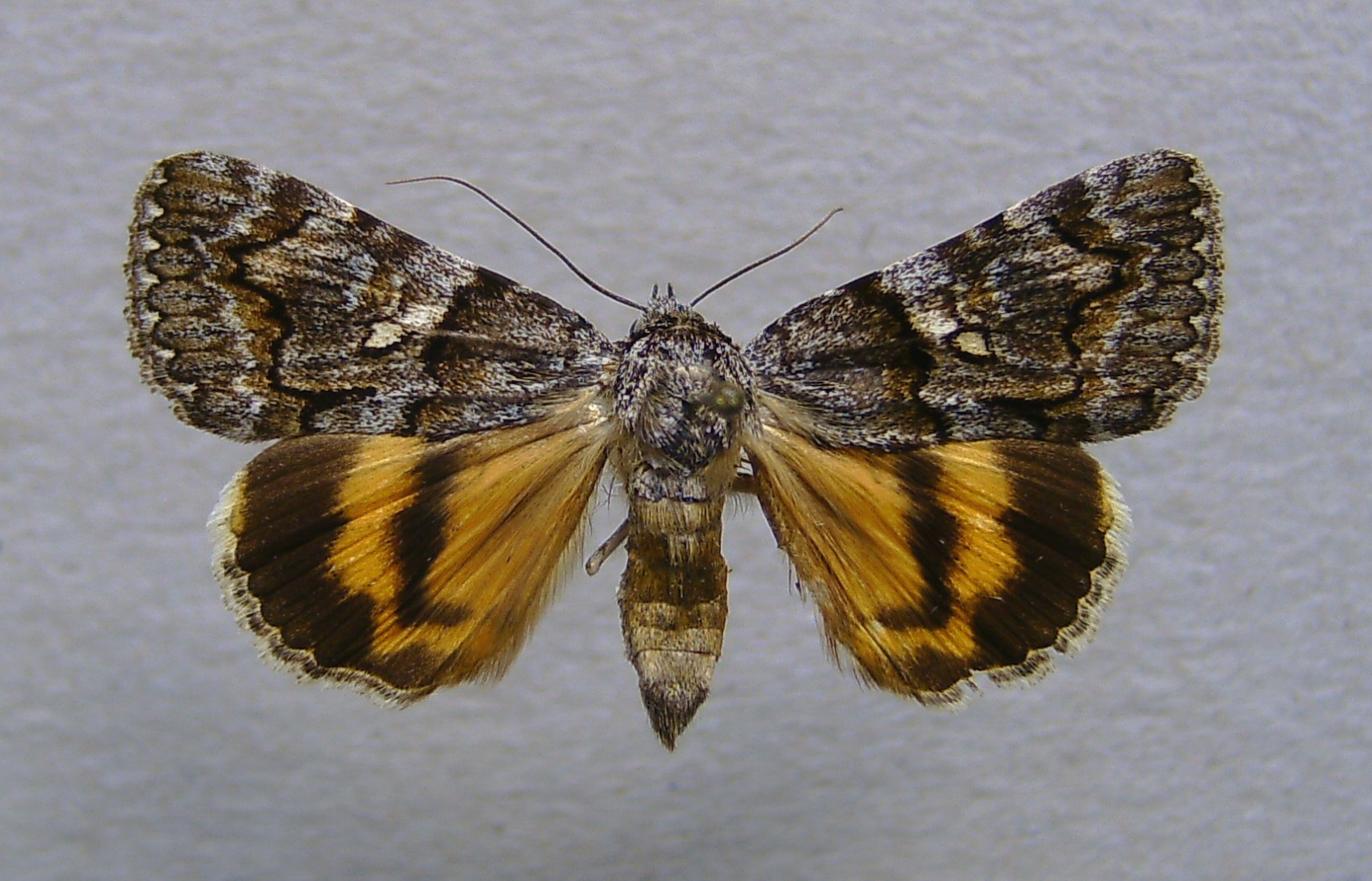
Catocala disjuncta

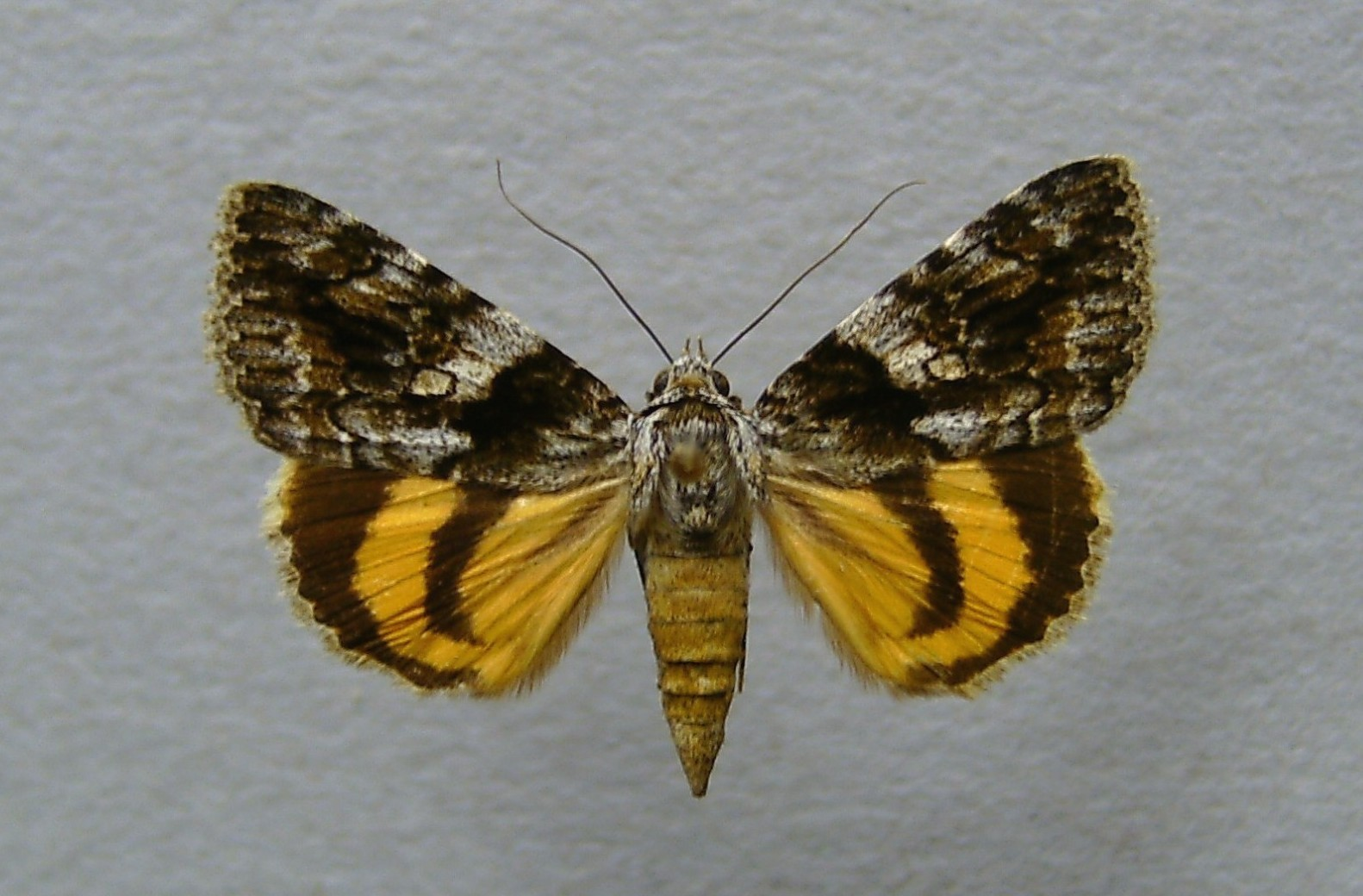
Catocala diversa

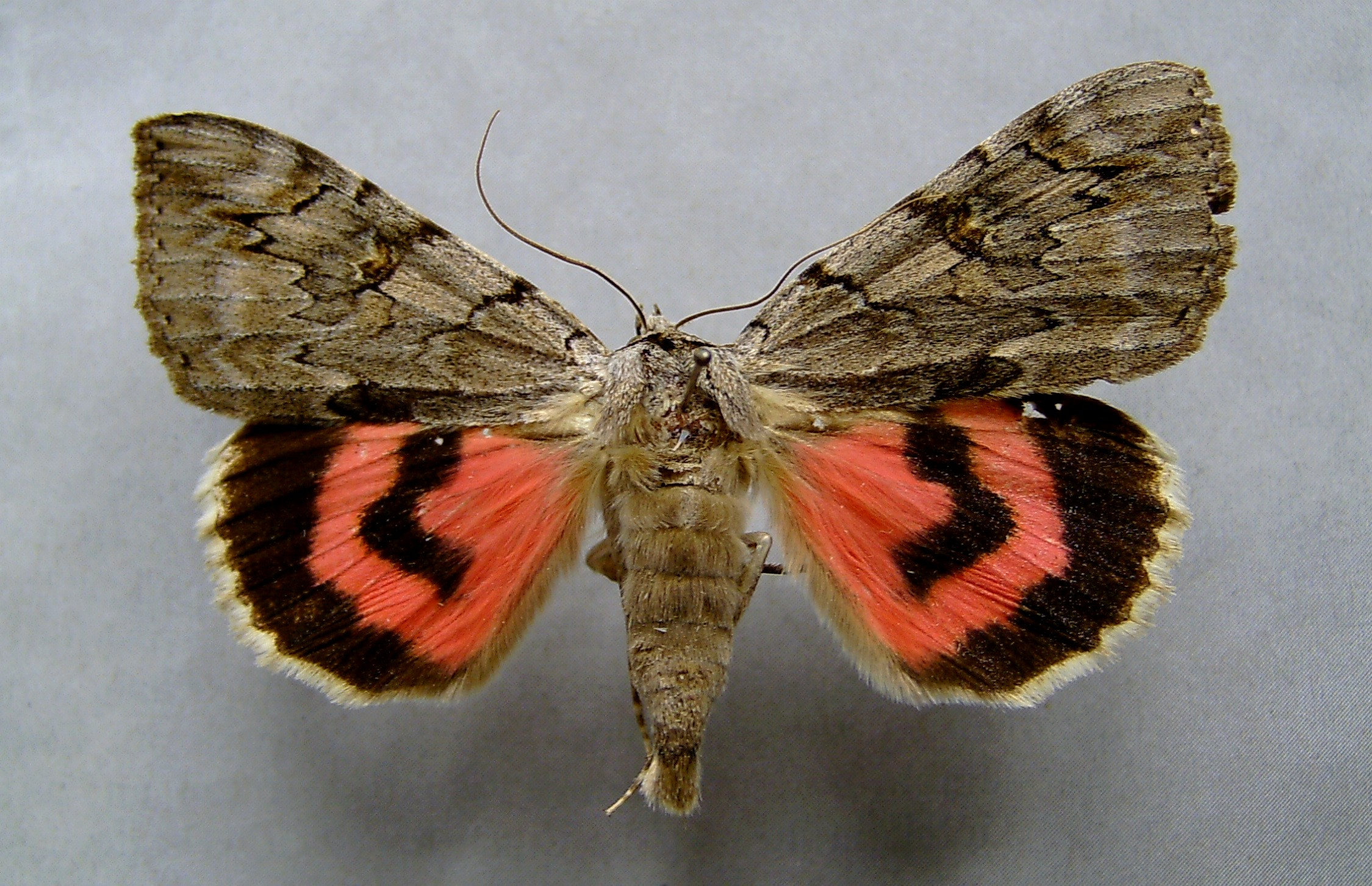
Catocala electa
rosy underwing

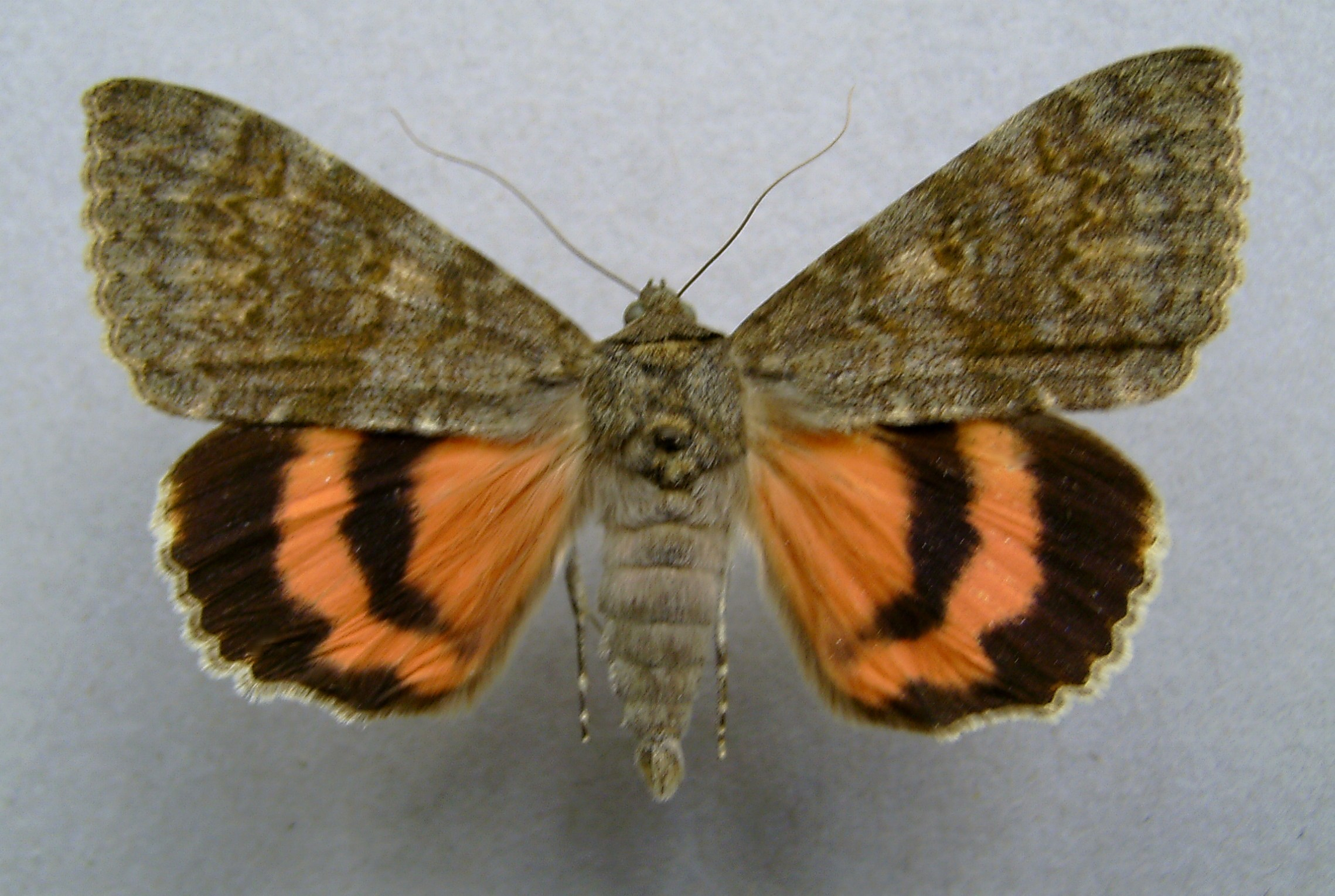
Catocala elocata
French red underwing

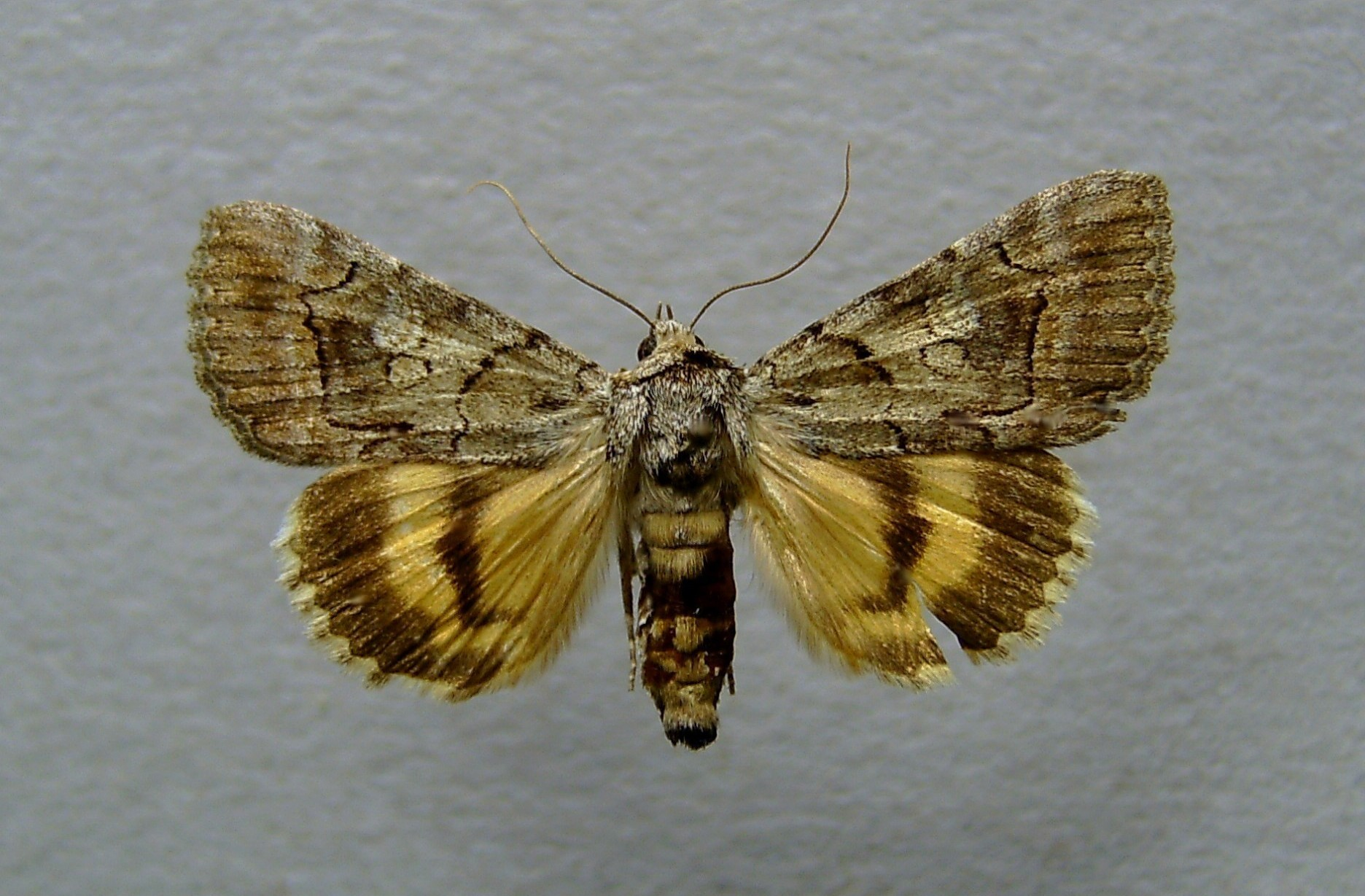
Catocala eutychea

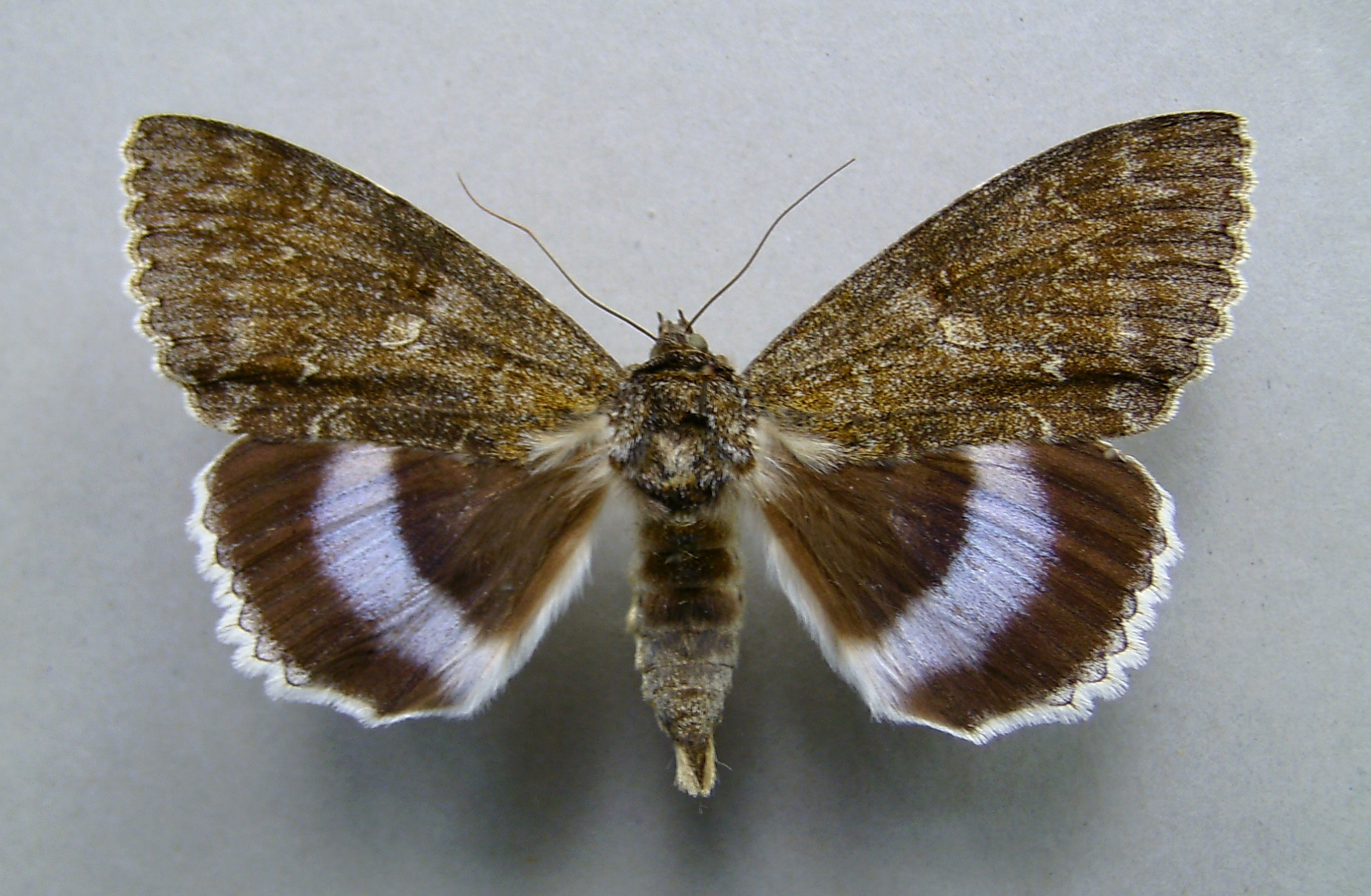
Catocala fraxini
blue underwing
type species of Hemigeometra

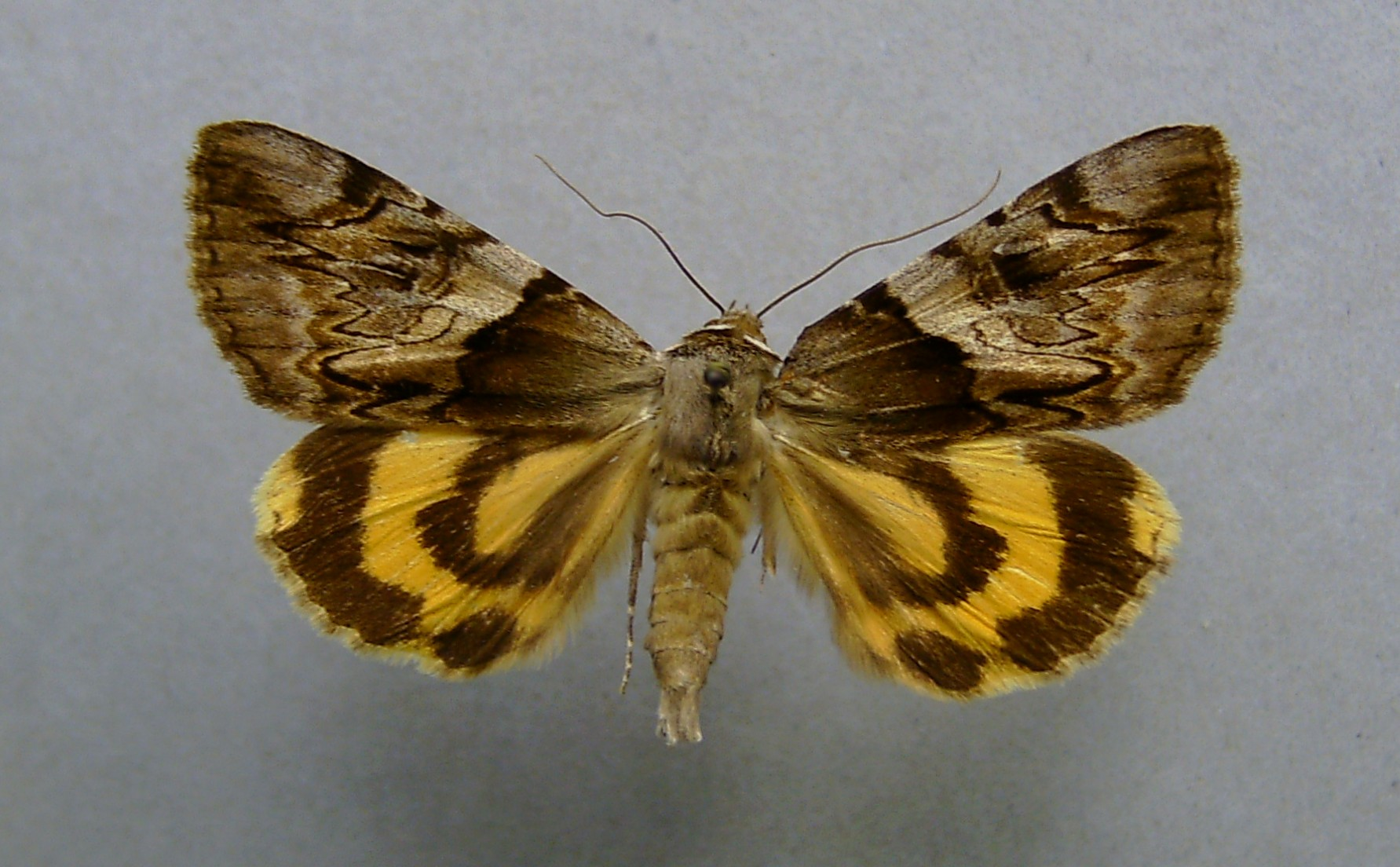
Catocala fulminea
type species of Ephesia

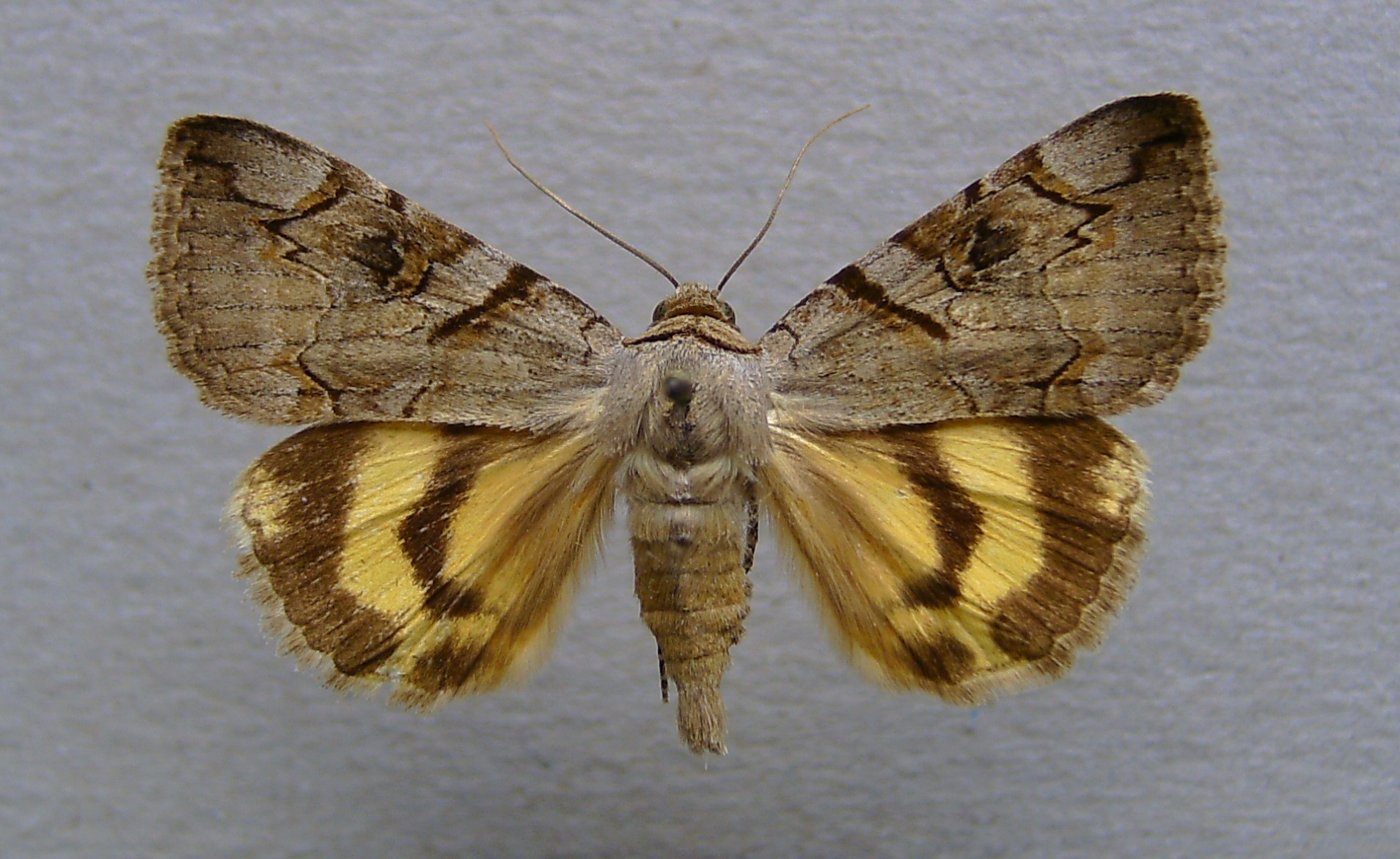
Catocala hymenaea

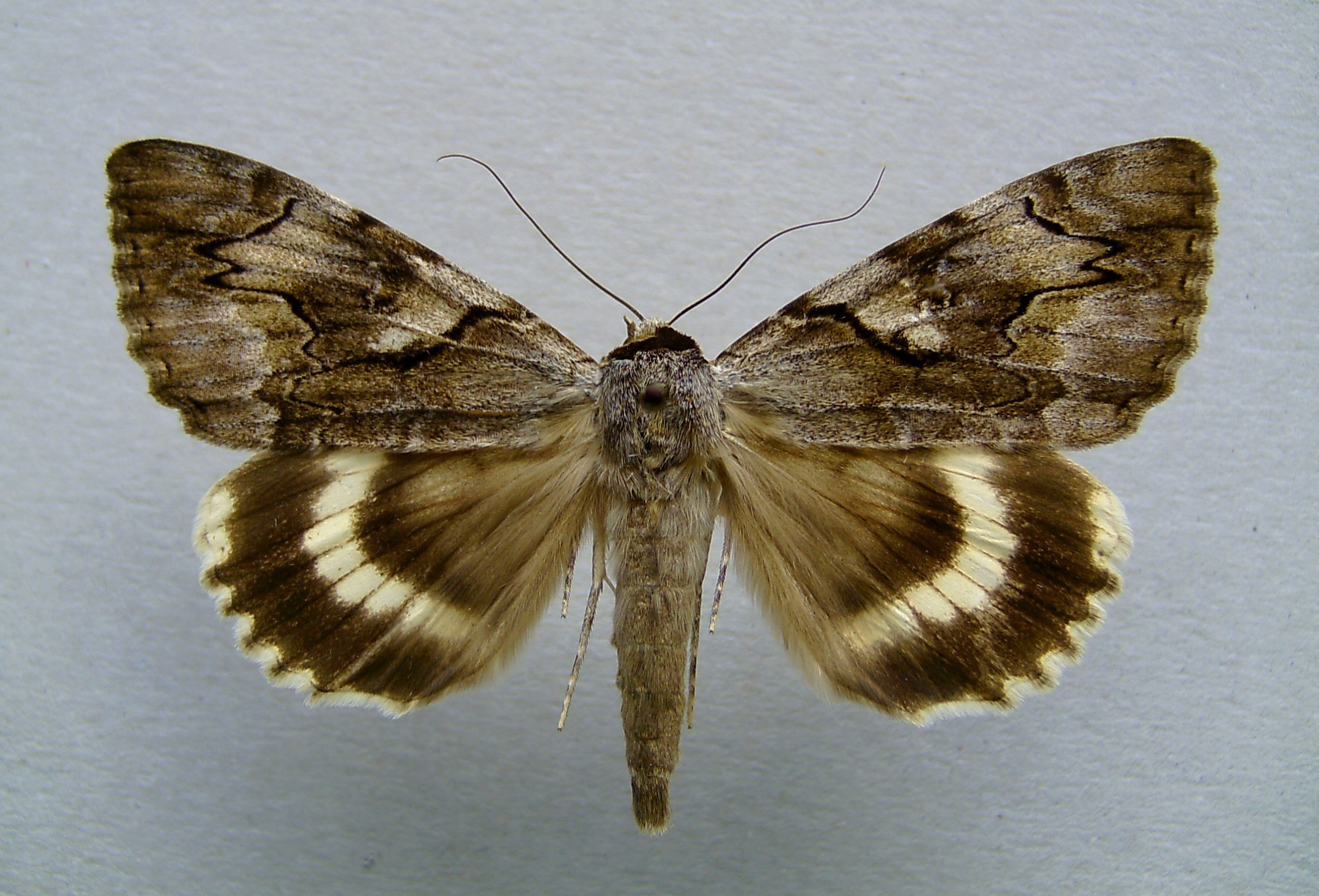
Catocala lara

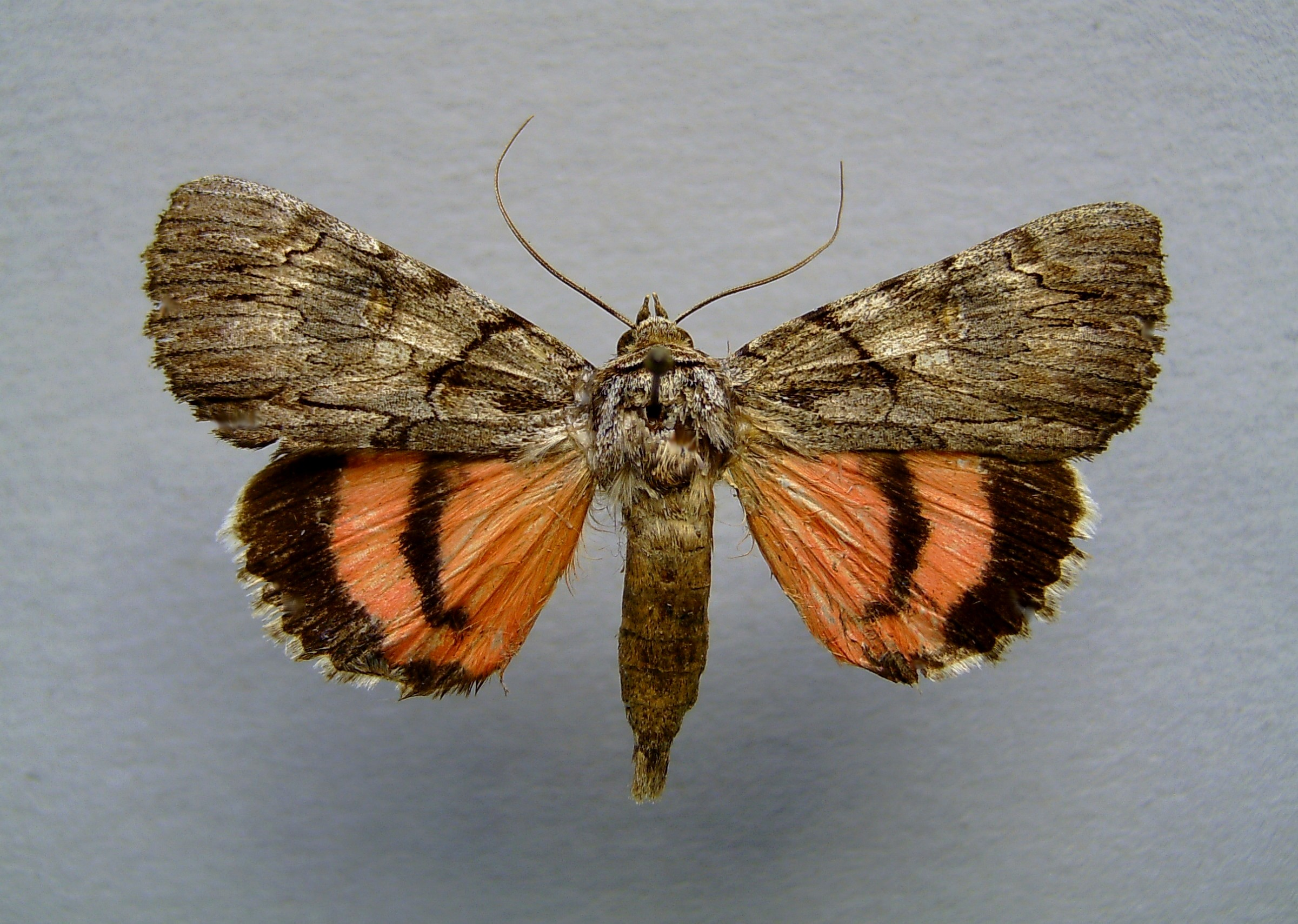
Catocala lupina

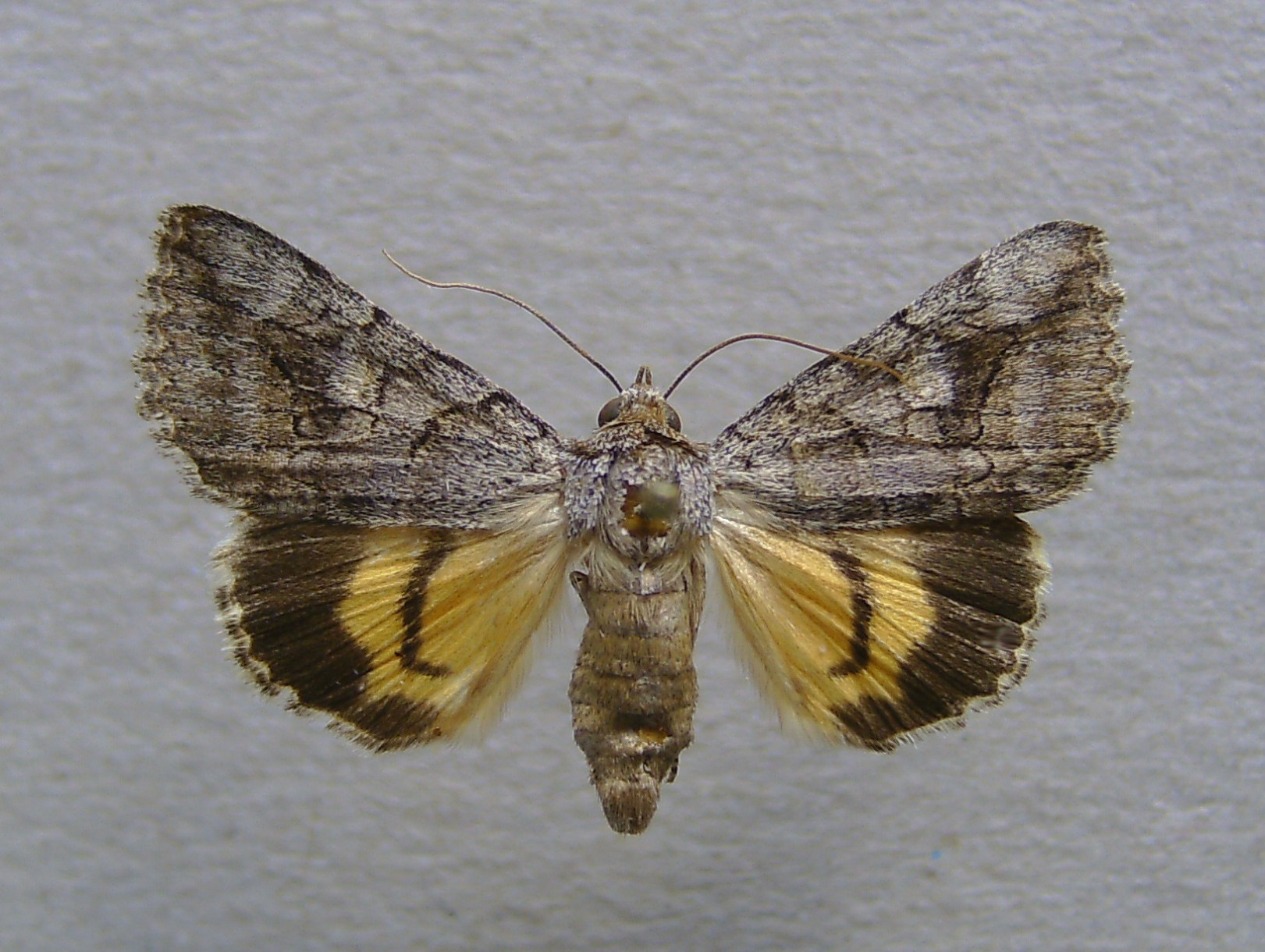
Catocala mariana

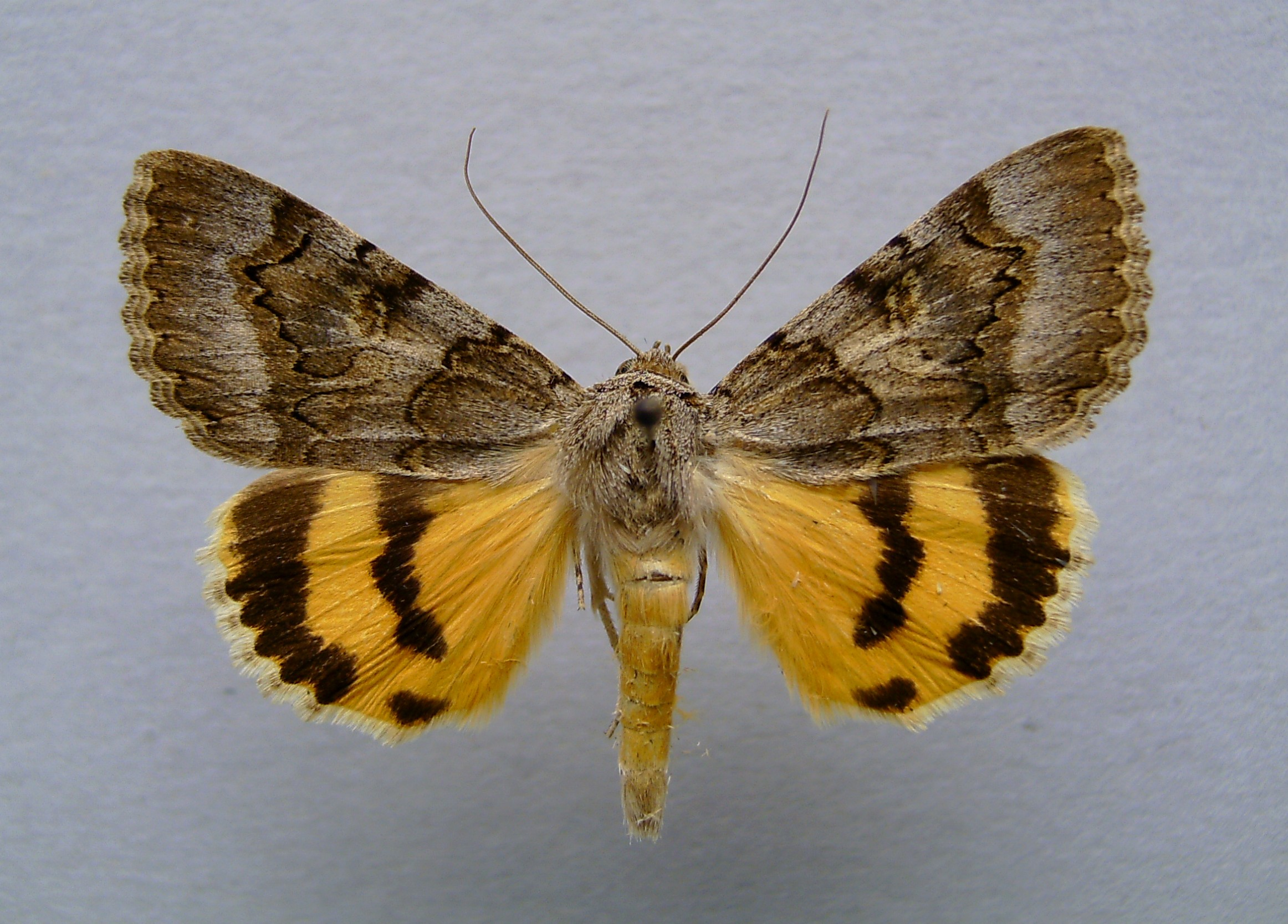
Catocala neonympha

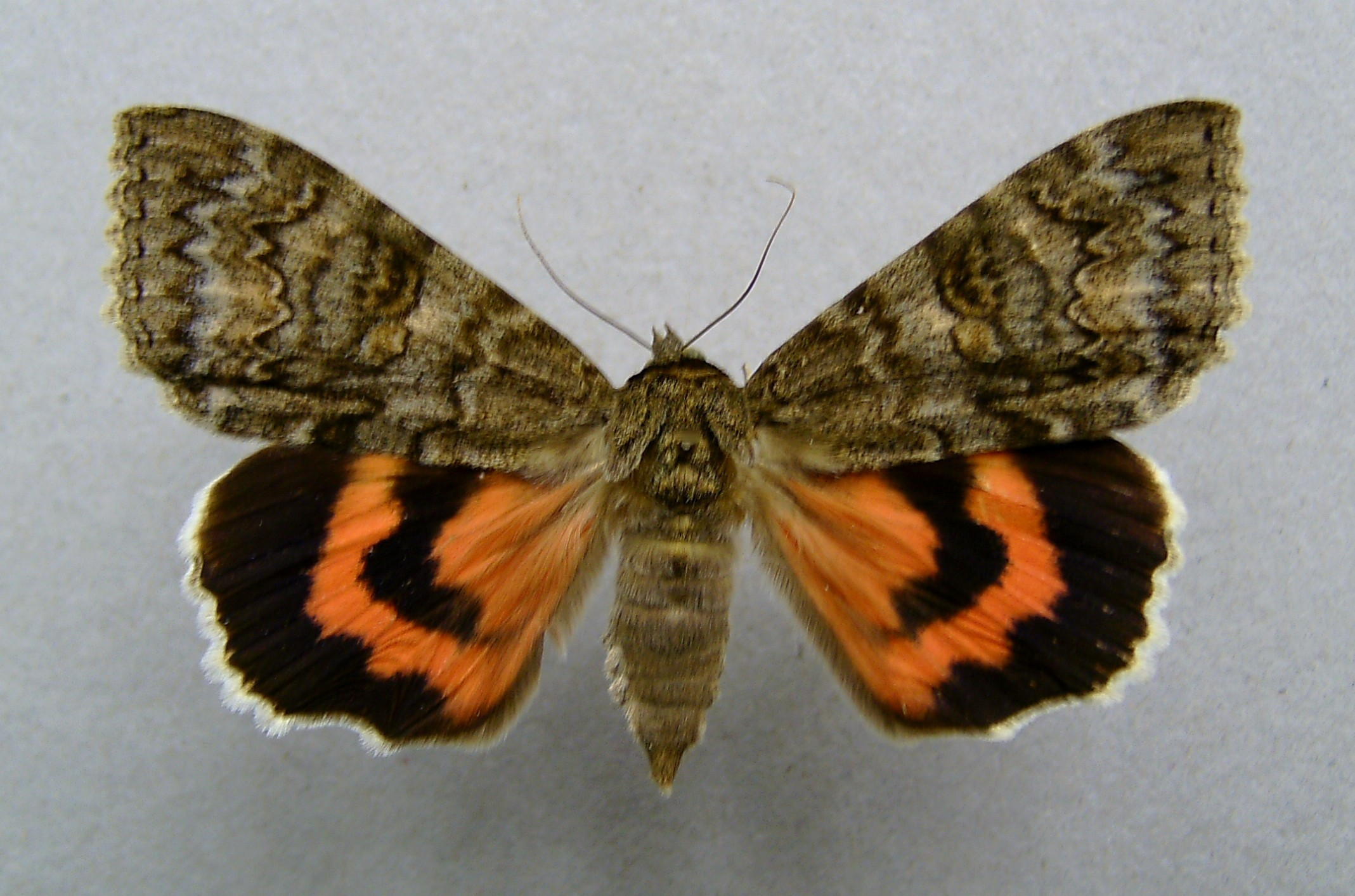
Catocala nupta
red underwing
type species of Catocala

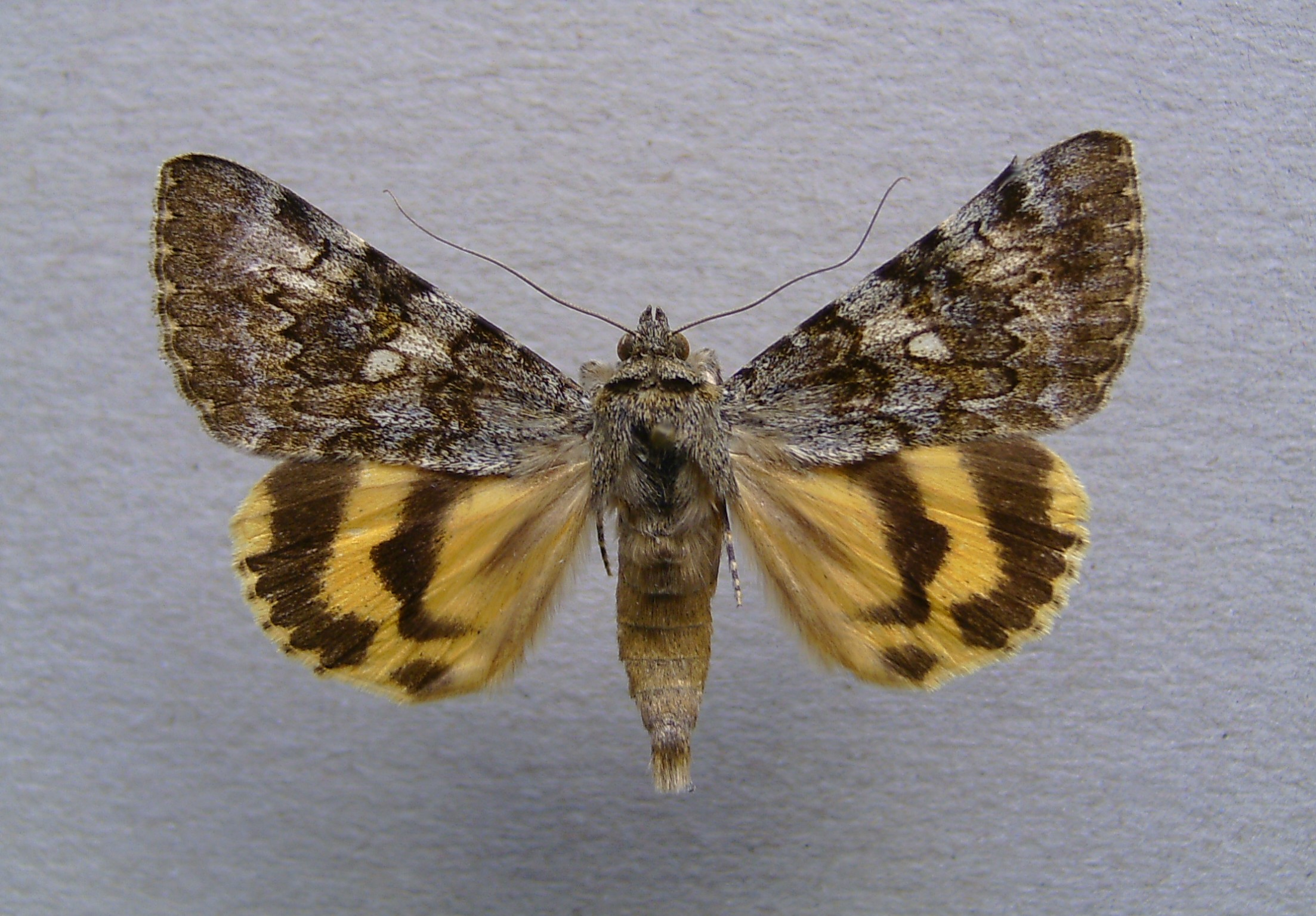
Catocala nymphaea

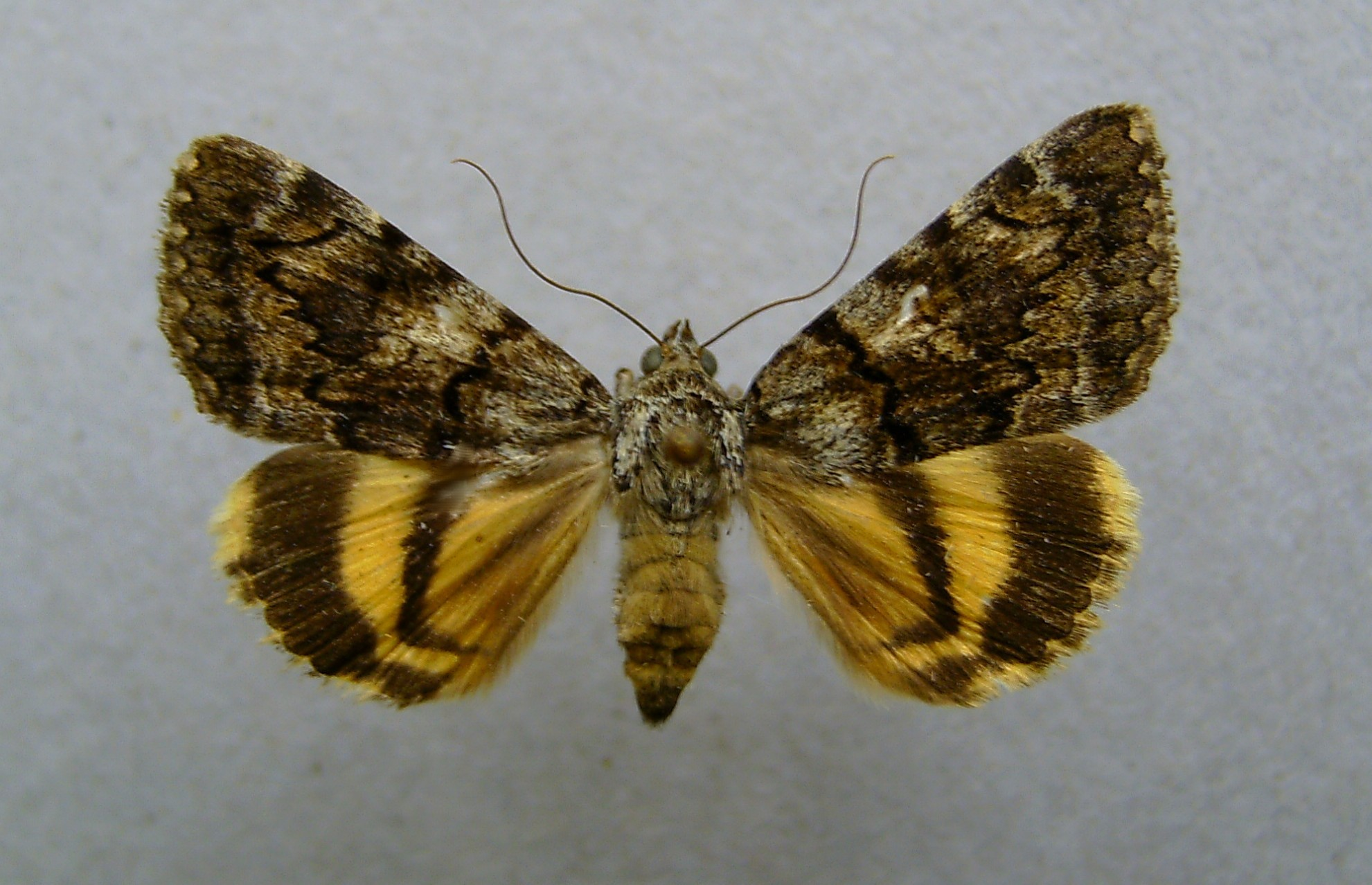
Catocala nymphagoga
oak yellow underwing

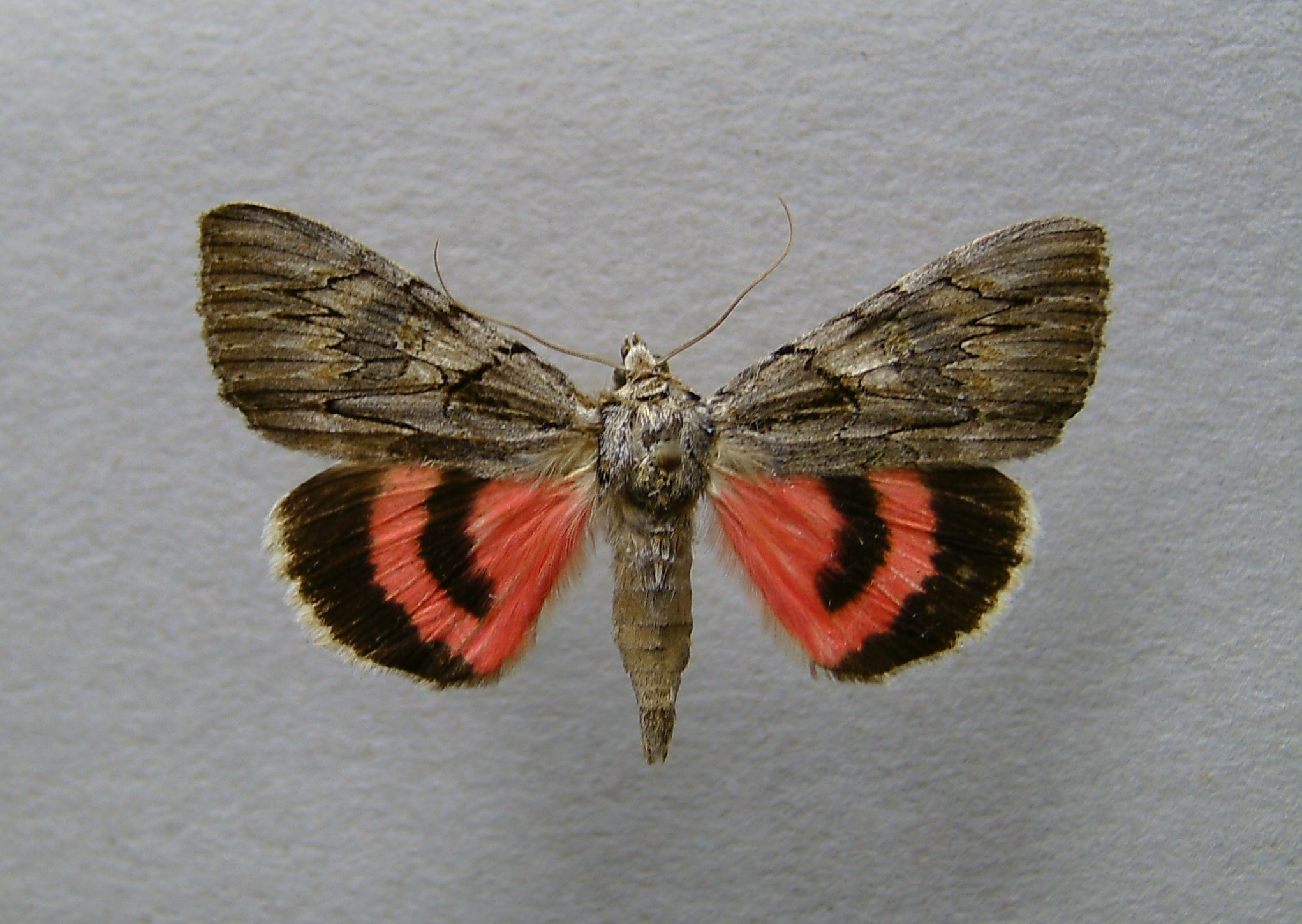
Catocala optata

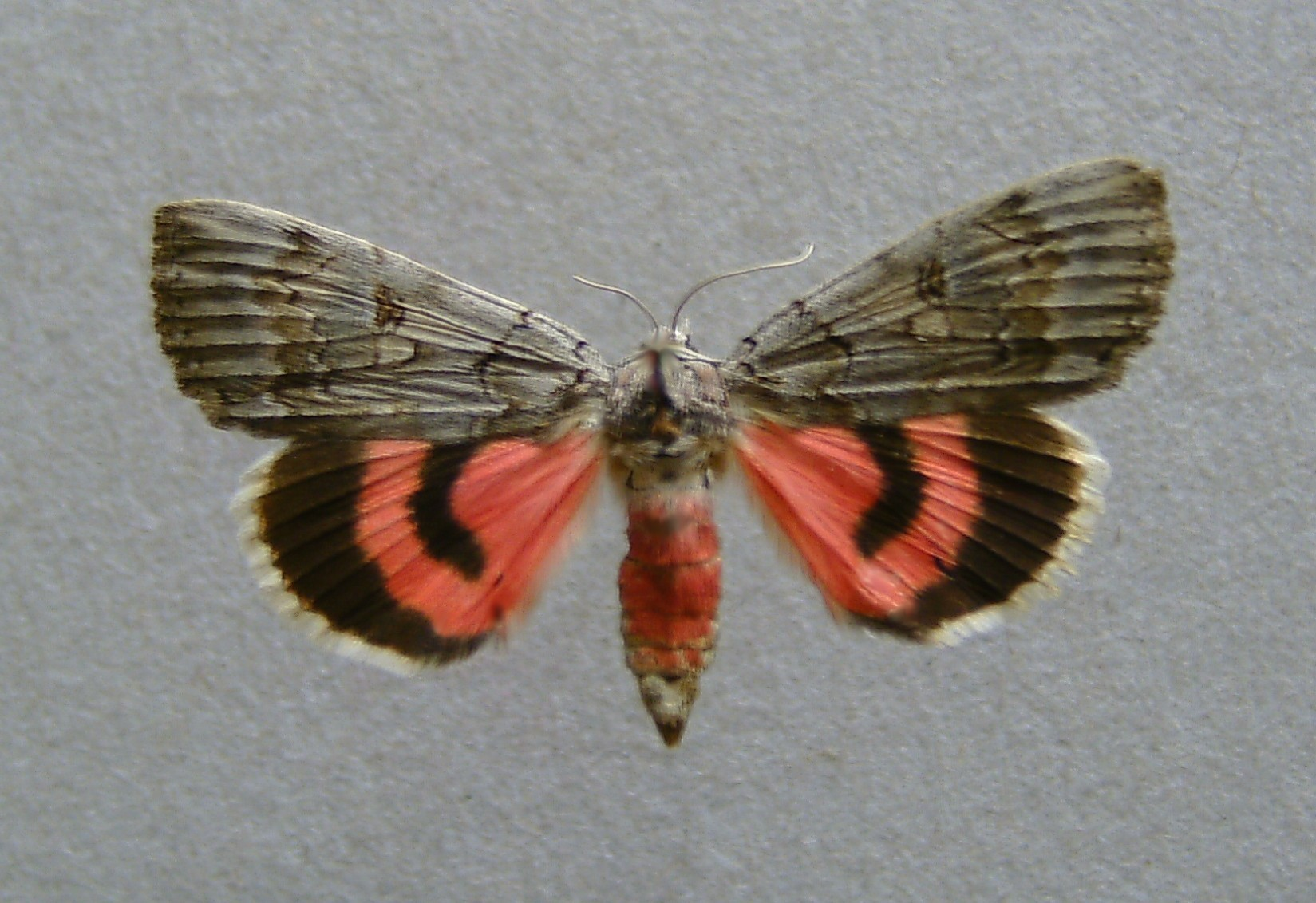
Catocala pacta

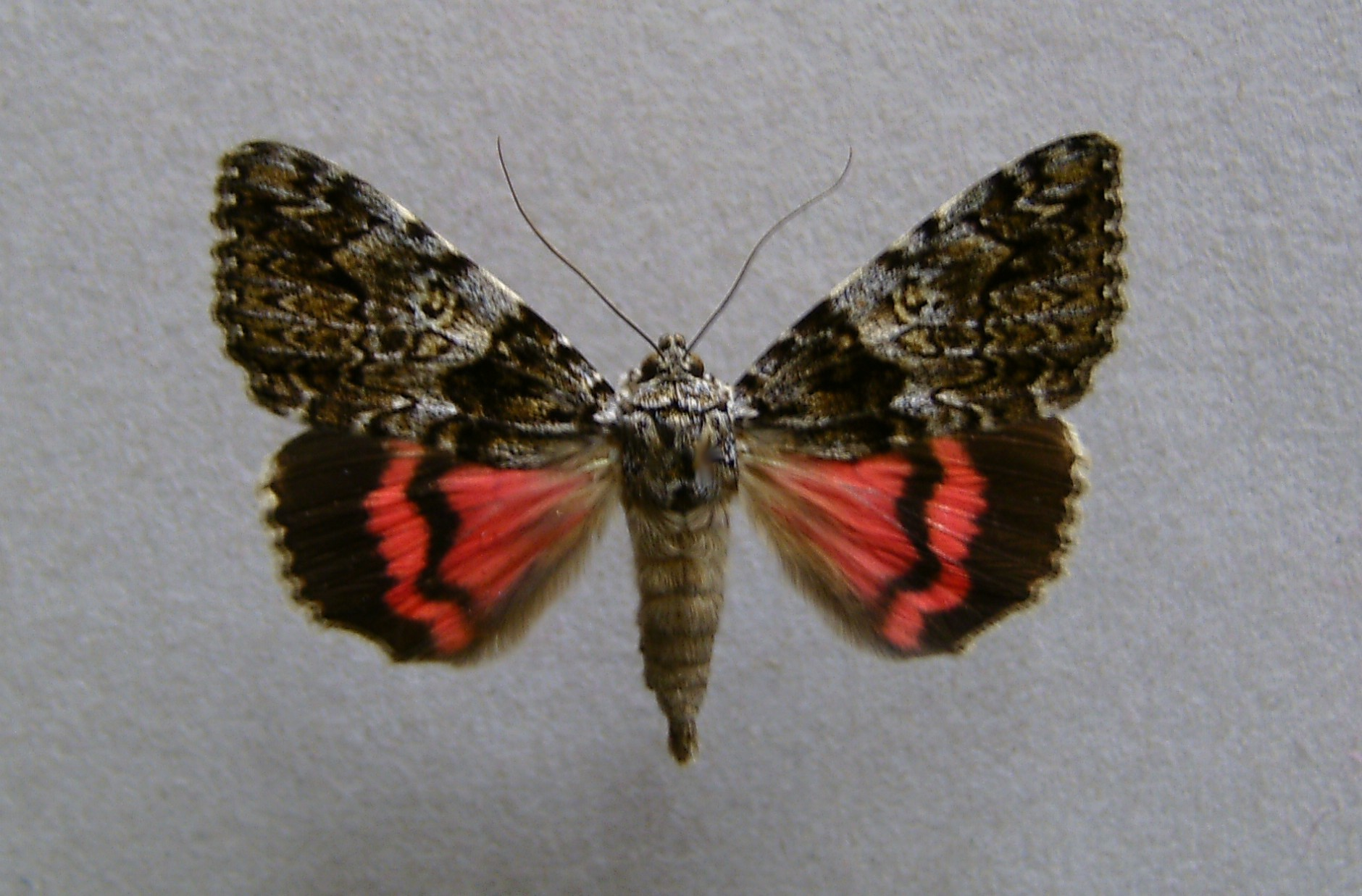
Catocala promissa
light crimson underwing

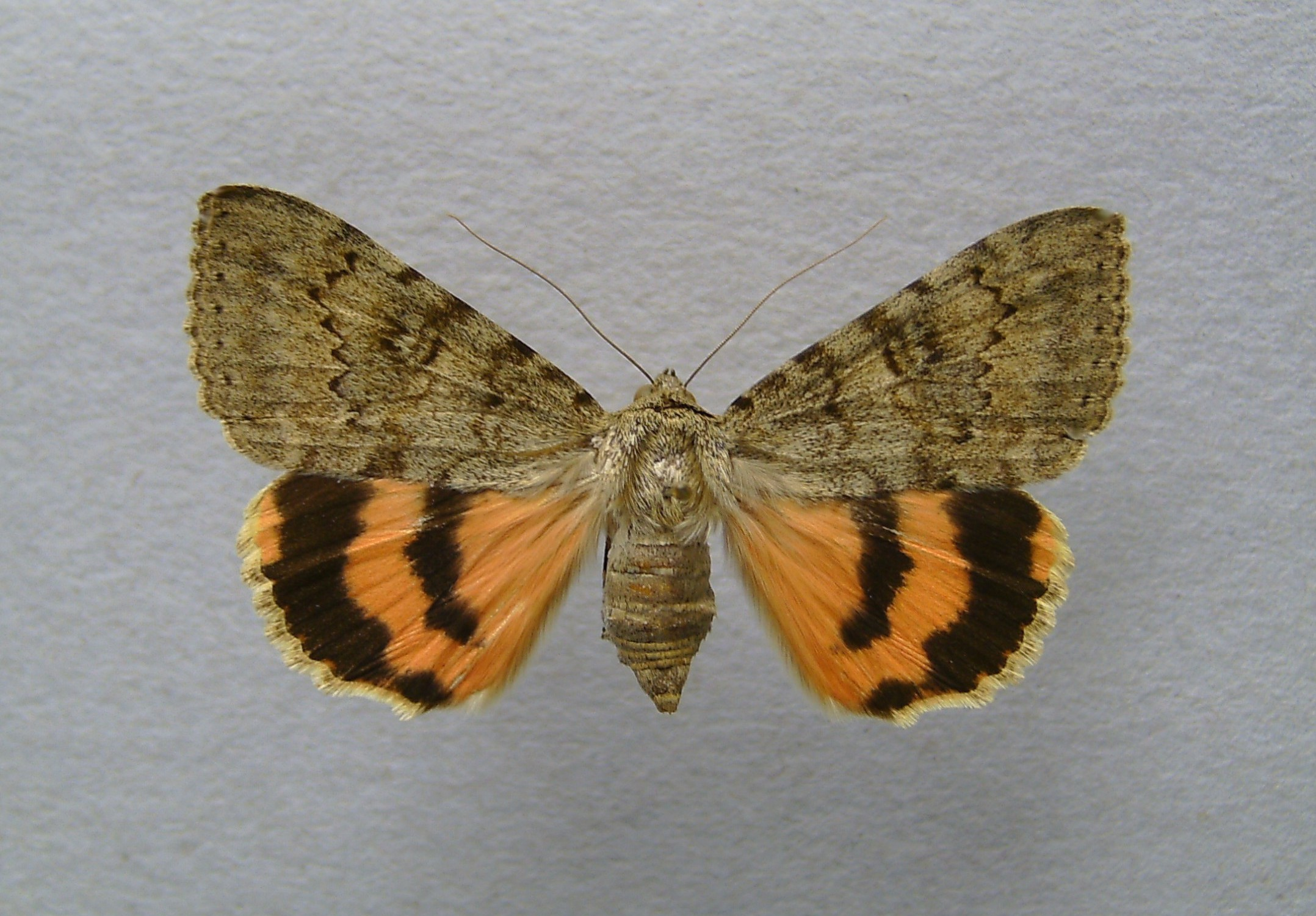
Catocala puerpera
type species of Eunetis

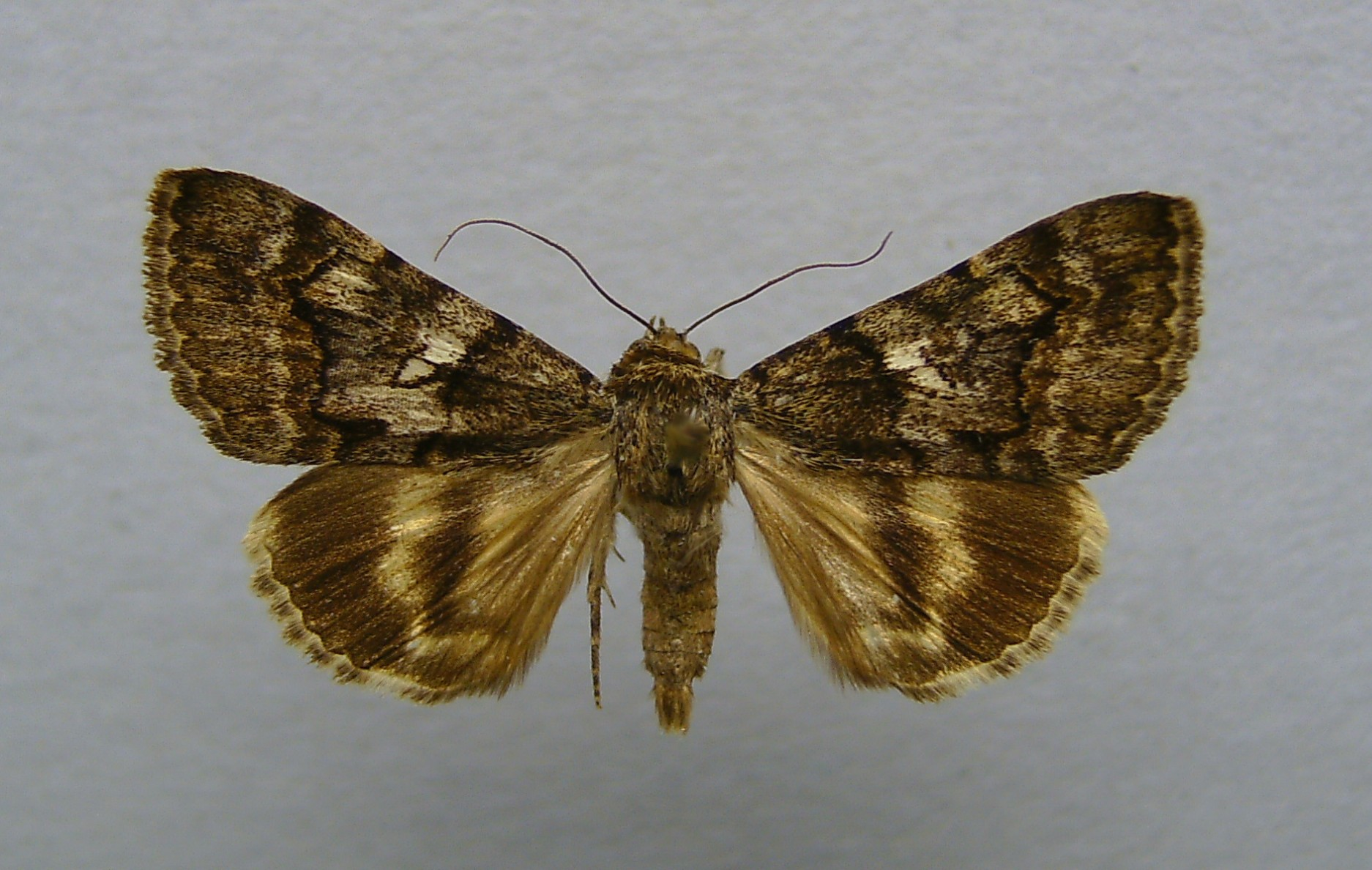
Catocala separata

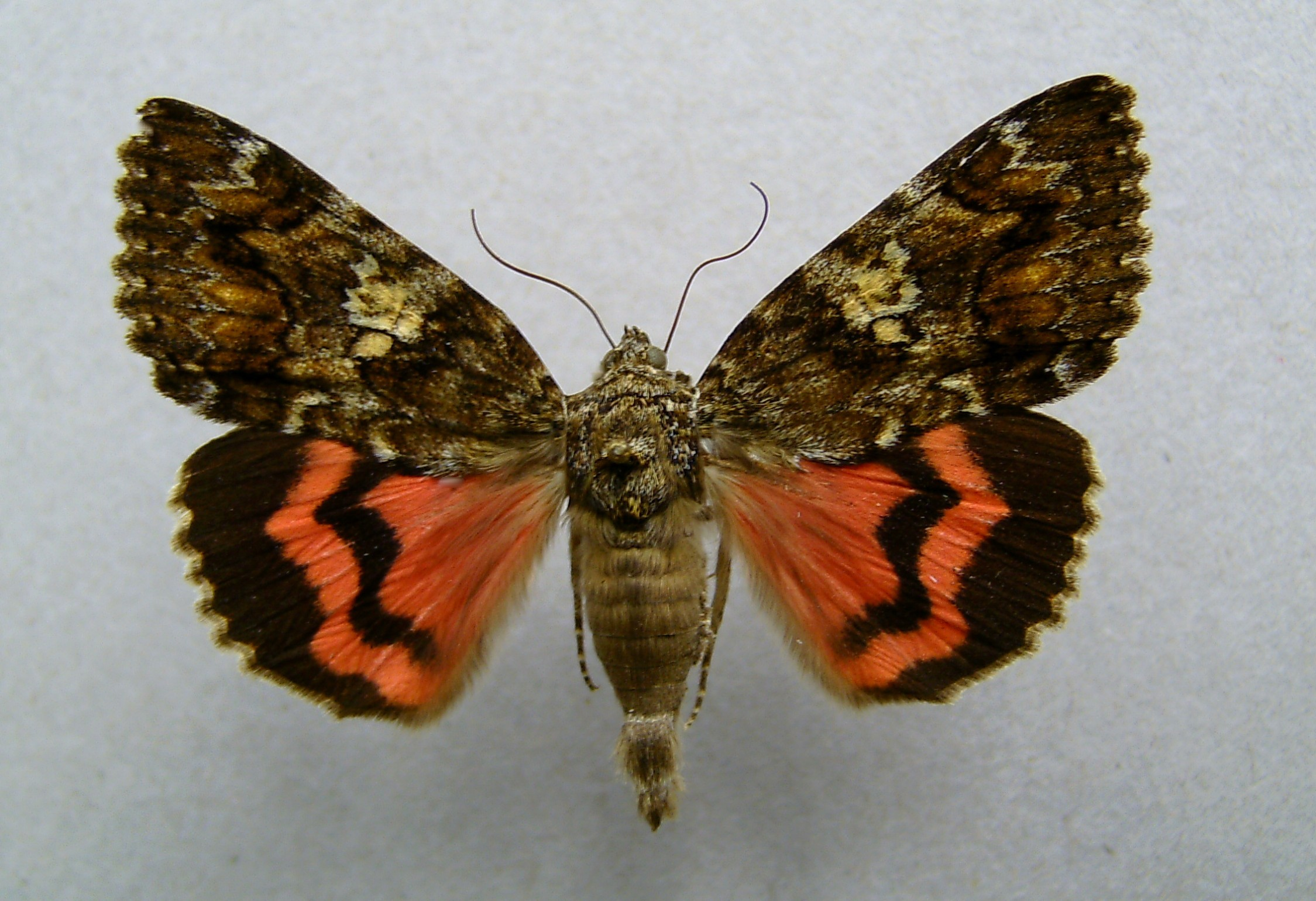
Catocala sponsa
dark crimson underwing

=== Nearctic species ===
- Catocala abbreviatella
- Catocala agrippina – Agrippina underwing
- Catocala aholibah – Aholibah underwing
- Catocala alabamae – Alabama underwing, titan underwing (including C. olivia, C. titania)
- Catocala allusa (sometimes in C. faustina)
- Catocala amatrix – sweetheart underwing (type of Lamprosia)
- Catocala amestris – three-staff underwing
- Catocala amica – girlfriend underwing (type of Corisce)
- Catocala andromache – Andromache underwing
- Catocala andromedae – Andromeda underwing, gloomy underwing
- Catocala angusi – Angus' underwing
- Catocala antinympha – sweetfern underwing (type of Catabapta)
- Catocala atocala – Atocala underwing, Brou's underwing
- Catocala badia – bay underwing, bayberry underwing, old maid
- Catocala benjamini – Benjamin's underwing (formerly in C. andromache)
- Catocala blandula – charming underwing
- Catocala briseis – Briseis underwing, ribbed underwing
- Catocala caesia – bluish-gray underwing
- Catocala californica (including C. erichi)
- Catocala californiensis
- Catocala cara – darling underwing
- Catocala carissima – carissima underwing (formerly in C. cara)
- Catocala cerogama – yellow-banded underwing
- Catocala charlottae (sometimes in C. praeclara)
- Catocala chelidonia
- Catocala cleopatra (sometimes in C. faustina)
- Catocala clintoni – Clinton's underwing
- Catocala coccinata – scarlet underwing
- Catocala concumbens – pink underwing, sleepy underwing
- Catocala connubialis – connubial underwing
- Catocala consors – consort underwing
- Catocala crataegi – hawthorn underwing, chokeberry underwing
- Catocala dejecta – dejected underwing
- Catocala delilah – Delilah underwing
- Catocala desdemona – Desdemona underwing (including C. ixion, formerly in C. delilah)
- Catocala dulciola – quiet underwing, sweet underwing
- Catocala electilis
- Catocala epione – Epione underwing (type of Mormonia)
- Catocala faustina
- Catocala flebilis – mournful underwing
- Catocala francisca (sometimes in C. hermia)
- Catocala frederici
- Catocala gracilis – graceful underwing
- Catocala grisatra – grisatra underwing
- Catocala grotiana – Grote's underwing
- Catocala grynea – woody underwing
- Catocala habilis – habilis underwing
- Catocala hermia – Hermia underwing (including C. sheba)
- Catocala herodias – Herodias' underwing, Gerhard's underwing
- Catocala hippolyta (sometimes in C. semirelicta)
- Catocala ilia – beloved underwing, Ilia underwing, wife underwing
- Catocala illecta – Magdalen underwing
- Catocala innubens – betrothed underwing
- Catocala insolabilis – inconsolable underwing
- Catocala irene – Irene's underwing
- Catocala jair – Jair underwing, barrens underwing
- Catocala jessica – Jessica underwing (including C. babayaga)
- Catocala johnsoniana – Johnson's underwing
- Catocala judith – Judith's underwing
- Catocala junctura – joined underwing, Stretch's underwing (including C. elsa, C. stretchii)
- Catocala lacrymosa – tearful underwing
- Catocala lincolnana – Lincoln underwing
- Catocala lineella – lineella underwing, little lined underwing, steely underwing (formerly in C. amica)
- Catocala louiseae – Louise's underwing (including C. protonympha)
- Catocala luciana – shining underwing
- Catocala maestosa – sad underwing
- Catocala manitoba – Manitoba underwing (sometimes in C. praeclara)
- Catocala marmorata – marbled underwing
- Catocala mcdunnoughi – McDunnough's underwing
- Catocala meskei – Meske's underwing
- Catocala messalina – Messalina underwing (type of Andrewsia)
- Catocala micronympha – little nymph underwing, little bride underwing
- Catocala minuta – little underwing
- Catocala mira – wonderful underwing
- Catocala miranda – Miranda underwing
- Catocala muliercula – little wife underwing
- Catocala myristica - Myristica underwing Kons & Borth, 2015
- Catocala nebulosa – clouded underwing
- Catocala neogama – the bride (including C. euphemia)
- Catocala nuptialis – married underwing
- Catocala obscura – obscure underwing
- Catocala ophelia
- Catocala orba – Orba underwing
- Catocala palaeogama – old wife underwing (sometimes in C. neogama)
- Catocala parta – mother underwing
- Catocala piatrix – penitent underwing
- Catocala praeclara – praeclara underwing
- Catocala pretiosa – precious underwing (formerly in C. crataegi)
  - Catocala pretiosa texarkana – Texarkana underwing
- Catocala relicta – the relict, "white underwing"
- Catocala residua – residua underwing
- Catocala retecta – yellow-gray underwing
  - Catocala (retecta) luctuosa – yellow-fringed underwing
- Catocala robinsoni – Robinson's underwing
- Catocala sappho – Sappho underwing
- Catocala semirelicta – semirelict underwing (including C. nevadensis, C. pura)
- Catocala serena – serene underwing
- Catocala similis – similar underwing
- Catocala sordida – sordid underwing
- Catocala subnata – youthful underwing
- Catocala texanae – Texan underwing
- Catocala ulalume – Ulalume underwing
- Catocala ultronia – dark red underwing, ultronia underwing
- Catocala umbrosa
- Catocala unijuga – once-married underwing
- Catocala verrilliana – Verrill's underwing
- Catocala vidua – widow underwing
- Catocala violenta
- Catocala whitneyi – Whitney's underwing

Comparison of North American species

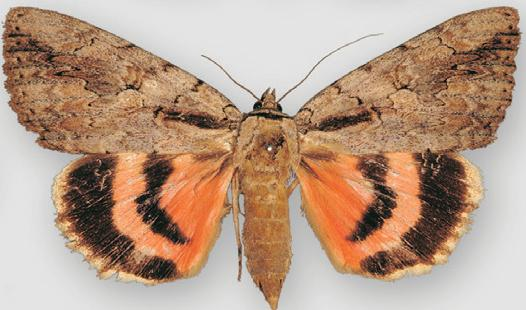
Catocala amatrix f. nurus
sweetheart underwing
type species of Lamprosia

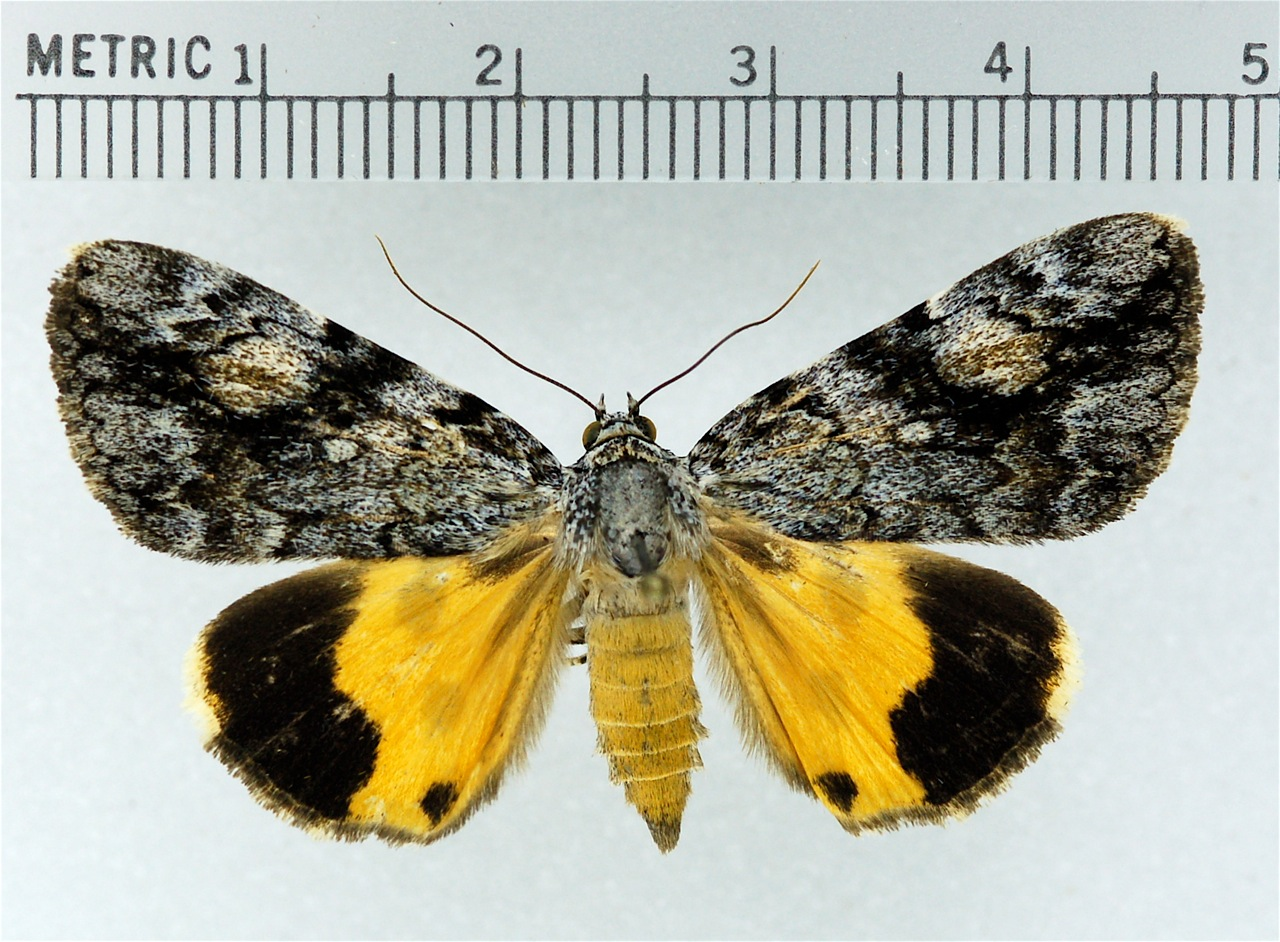
Catocala amica
girlfriend underwing
type species of Corisce

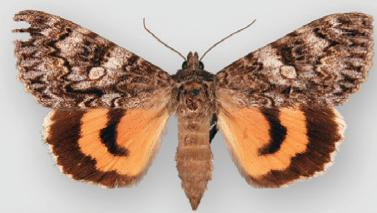
Catocala allusa

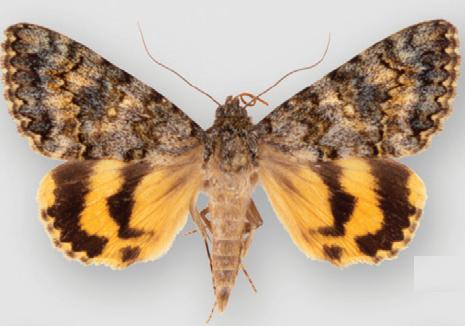
Catocala andromache
Andromache underwing

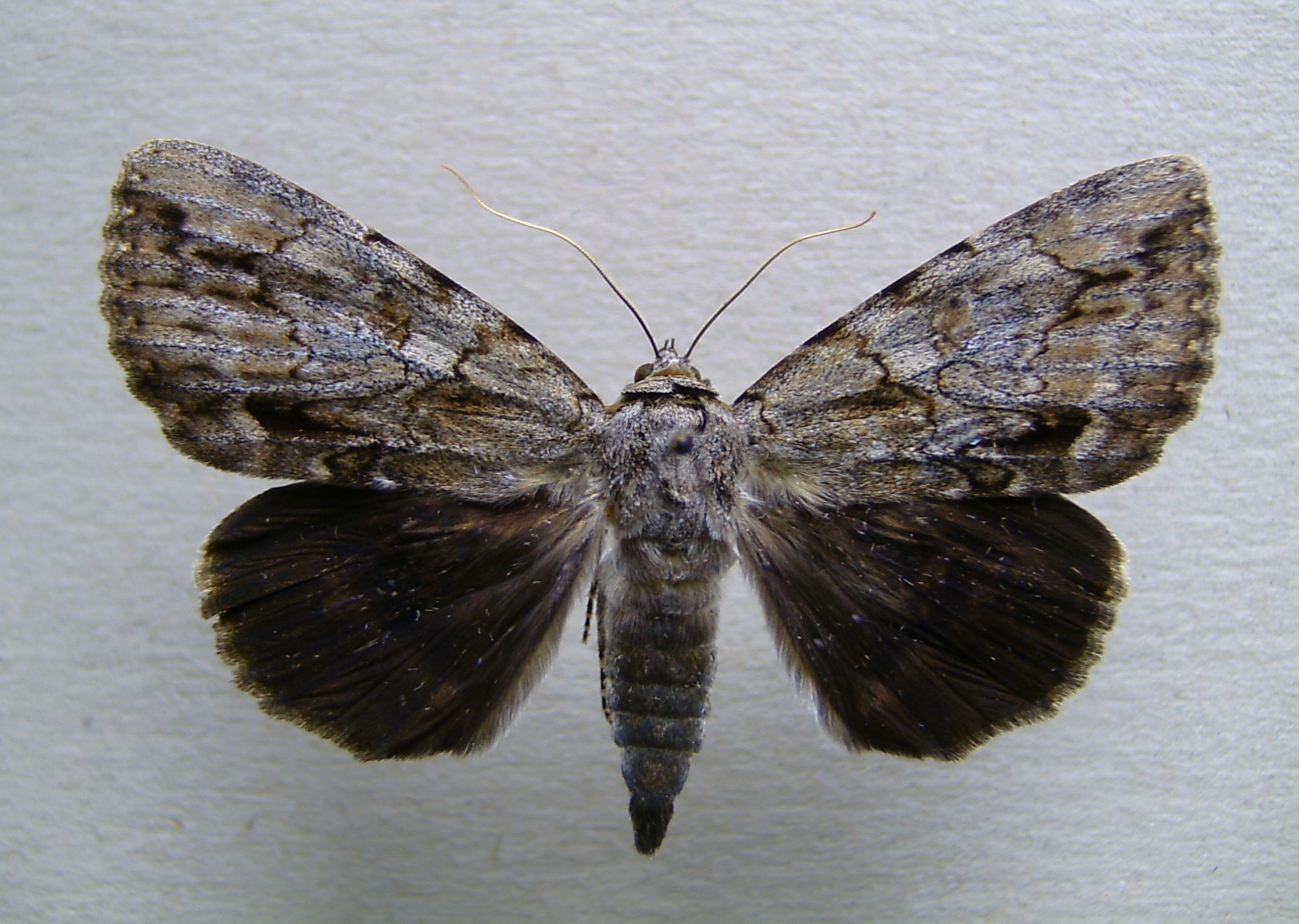
Catocala angusi
Angus' underwing

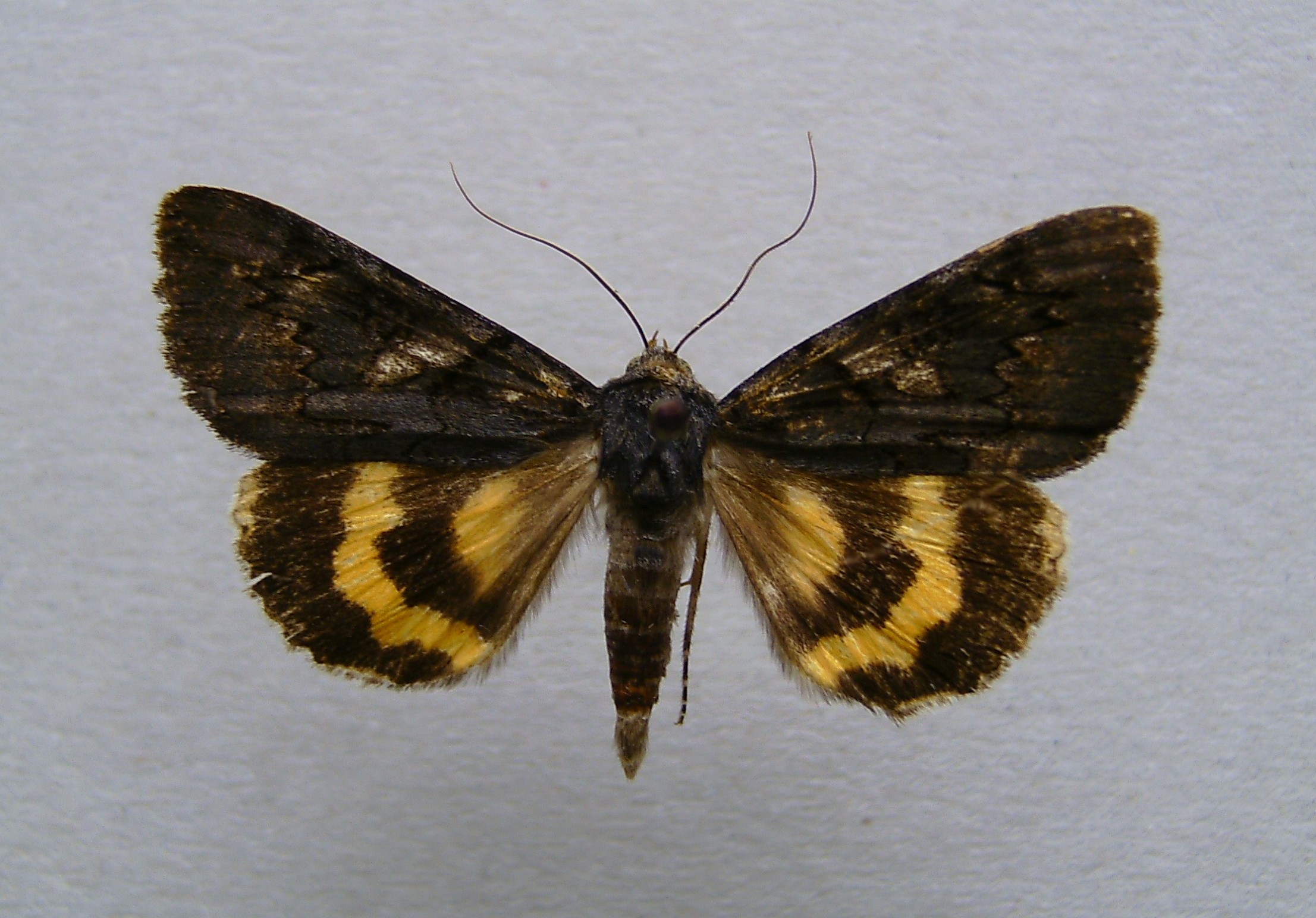
Catocala antinympha
sweetfern underwing

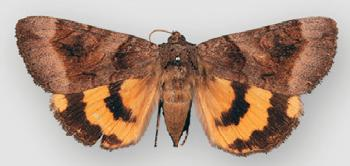
Catocala badia
bay underwing

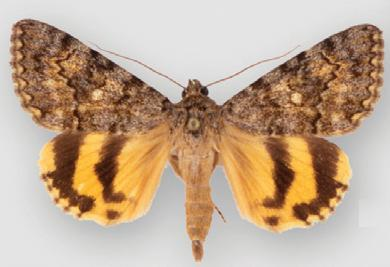
Catocala benjamini benjamini
Benjamin's underwing

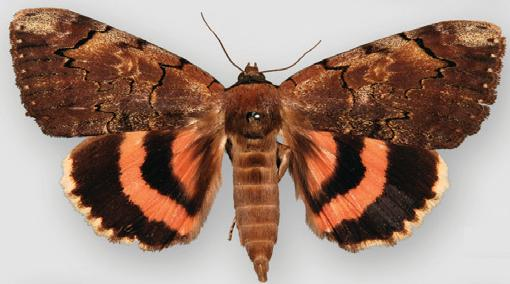
Catocala carissima
carissima underwing

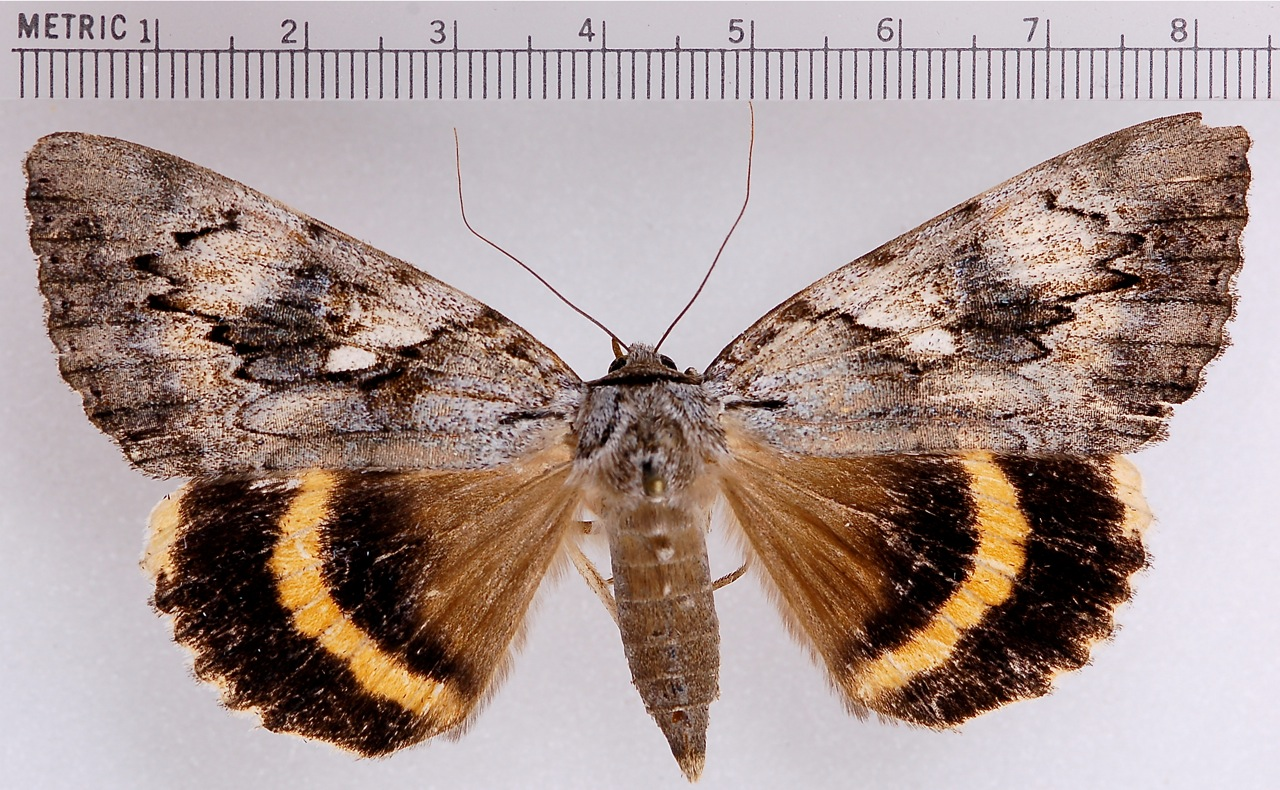
Catocala cerogama
yellow-banded underwing

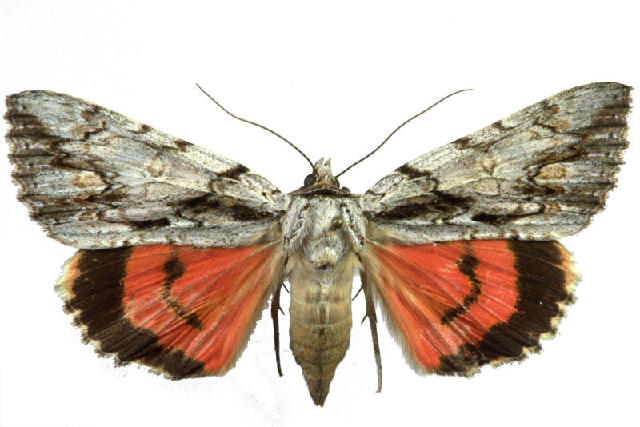
Catocala coccinata
scarlet underwing

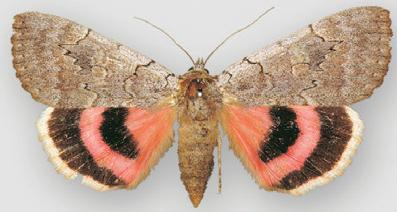
Catocala concumbens
pink underwing

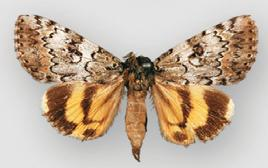
Catocala connubialis f. sancta
connubial underwing

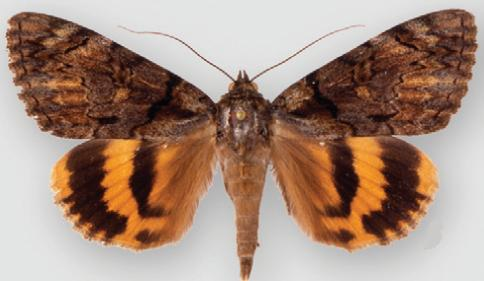
Catocala delilah
Delilah underwing

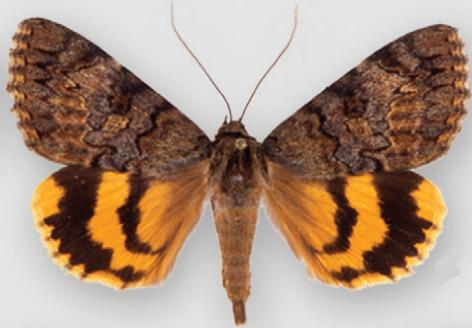
Catocala desdemona
Desdemona underwing

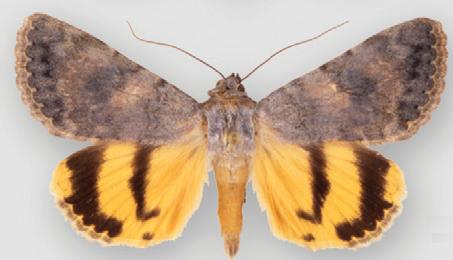
Catocala frederici

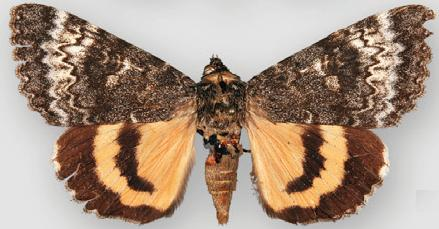
Catocala grotiana
Grote's underwing

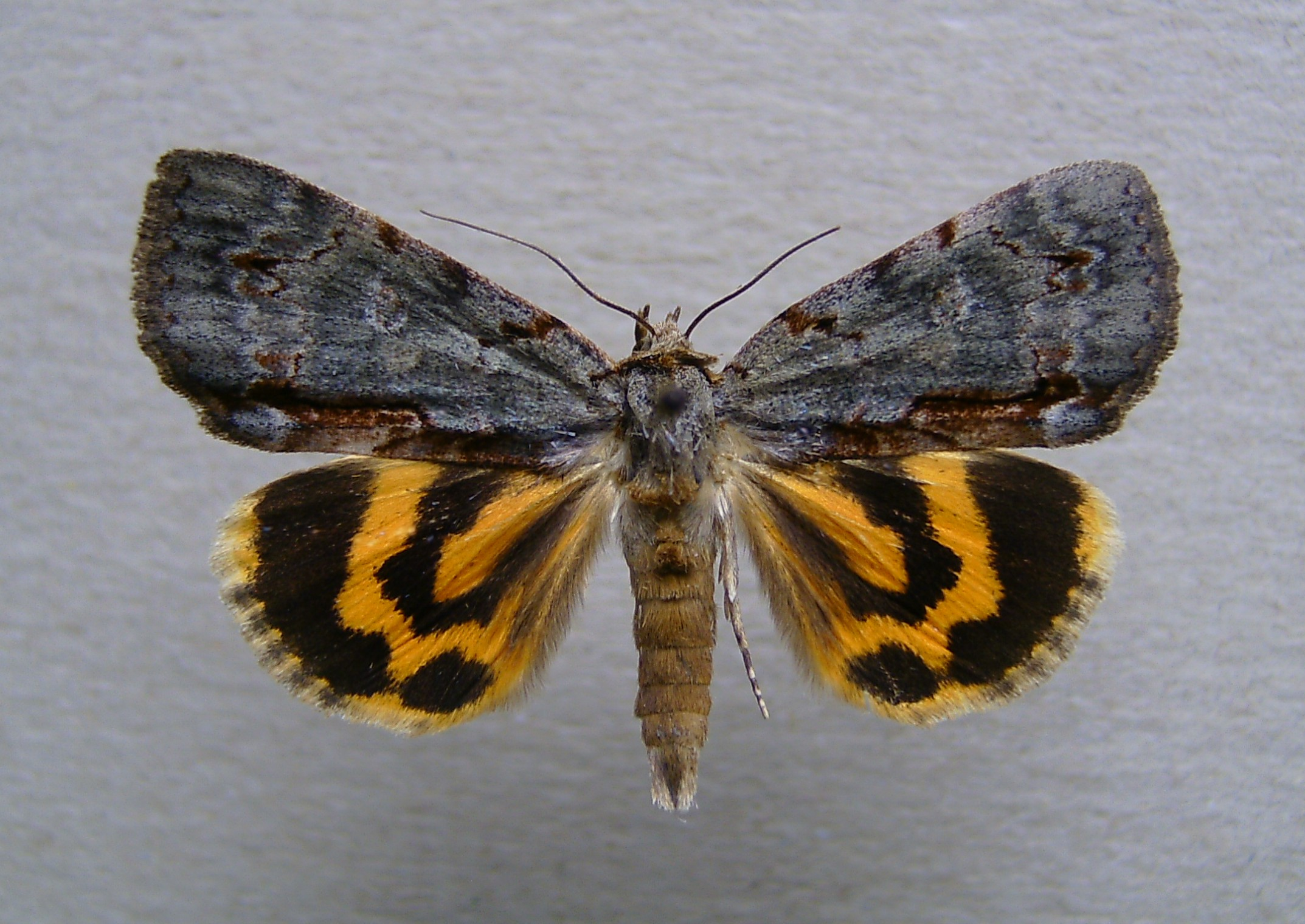
Catocala grynea
woody underwing

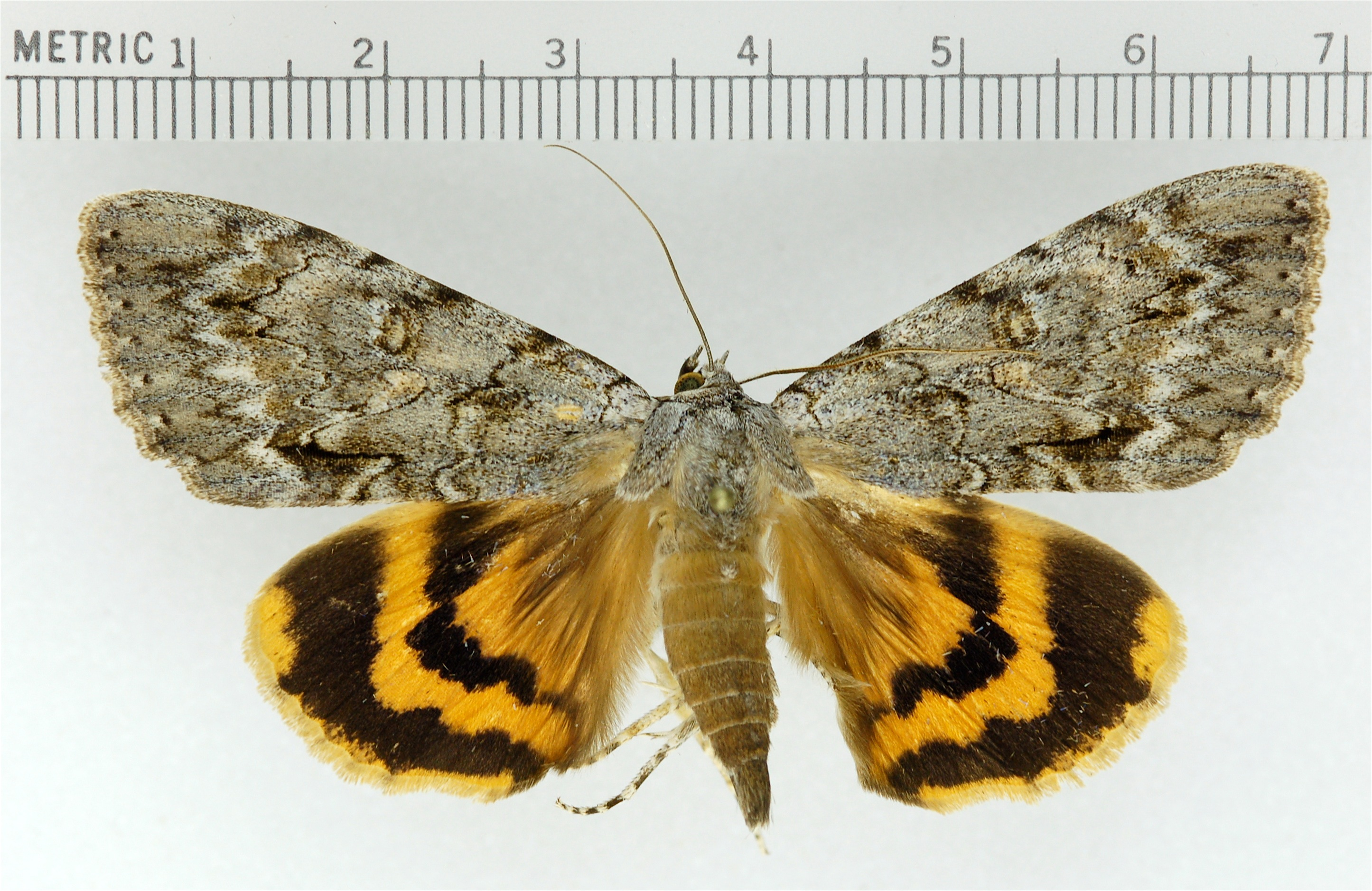
Catocala habilis
habilis underwing

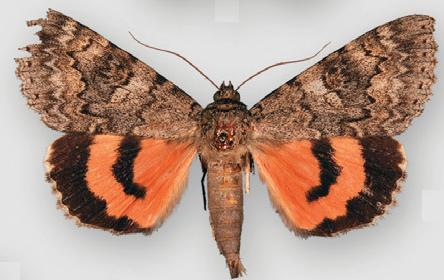
Catocala hermia f. diantha
Hermia underwing

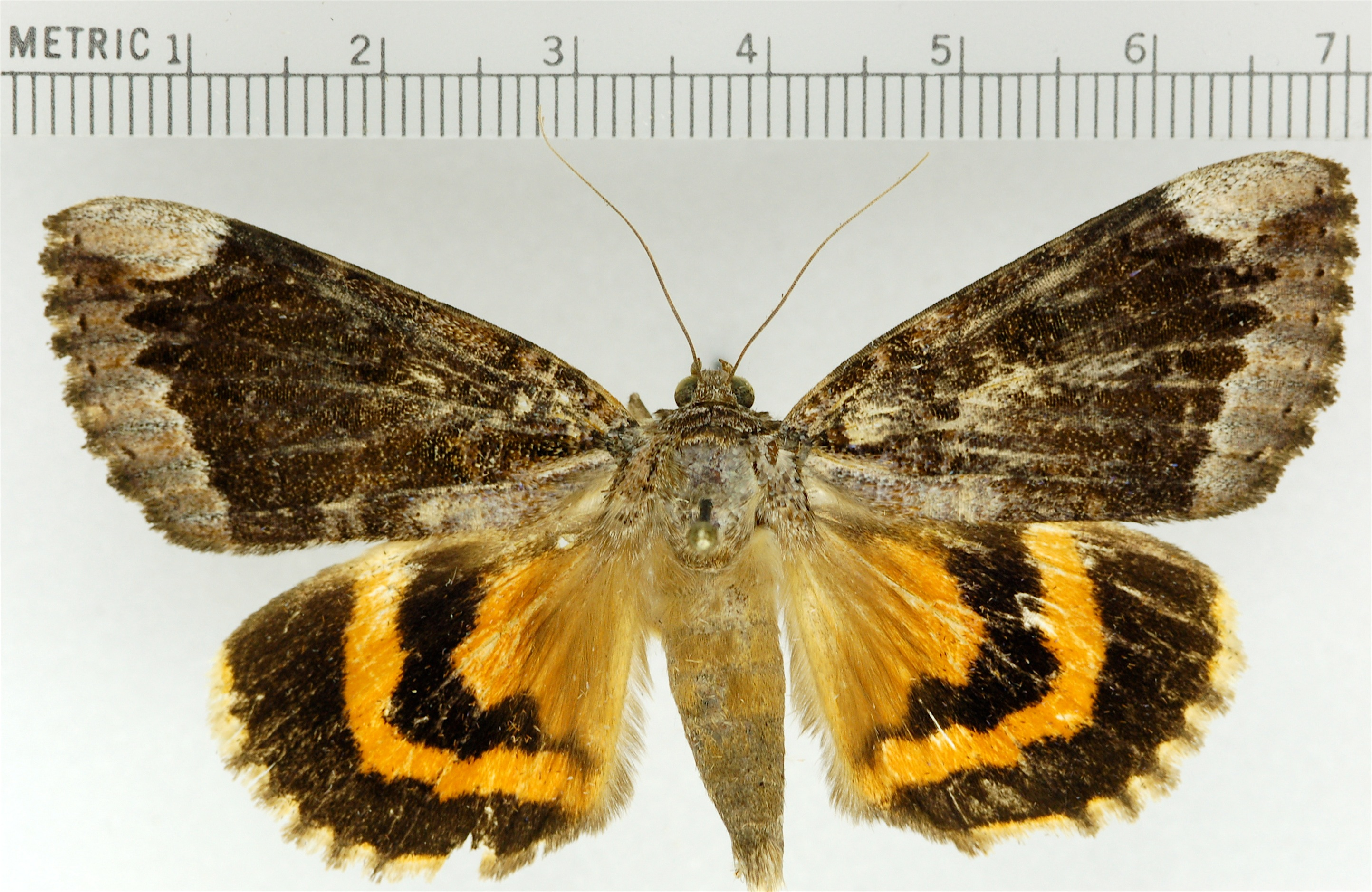
Catocala innubens
betrothed underwing

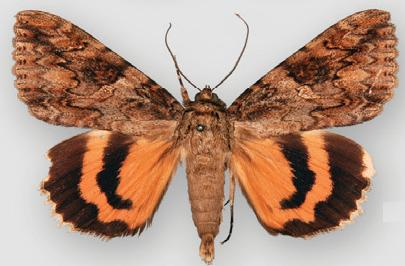
Catocala irene
Irene's underwing

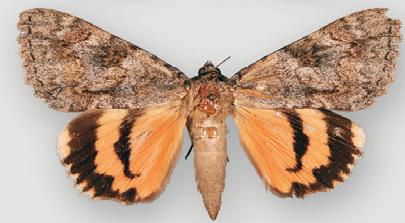
Catocala jessica
Jessica underwing

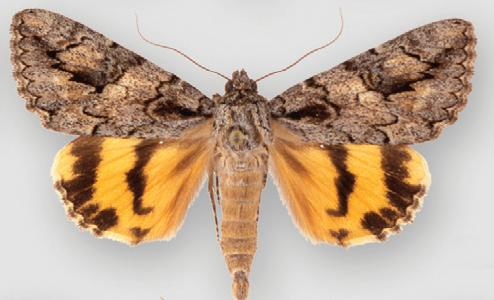
Catocala johnsoniana
Johnson's underwing

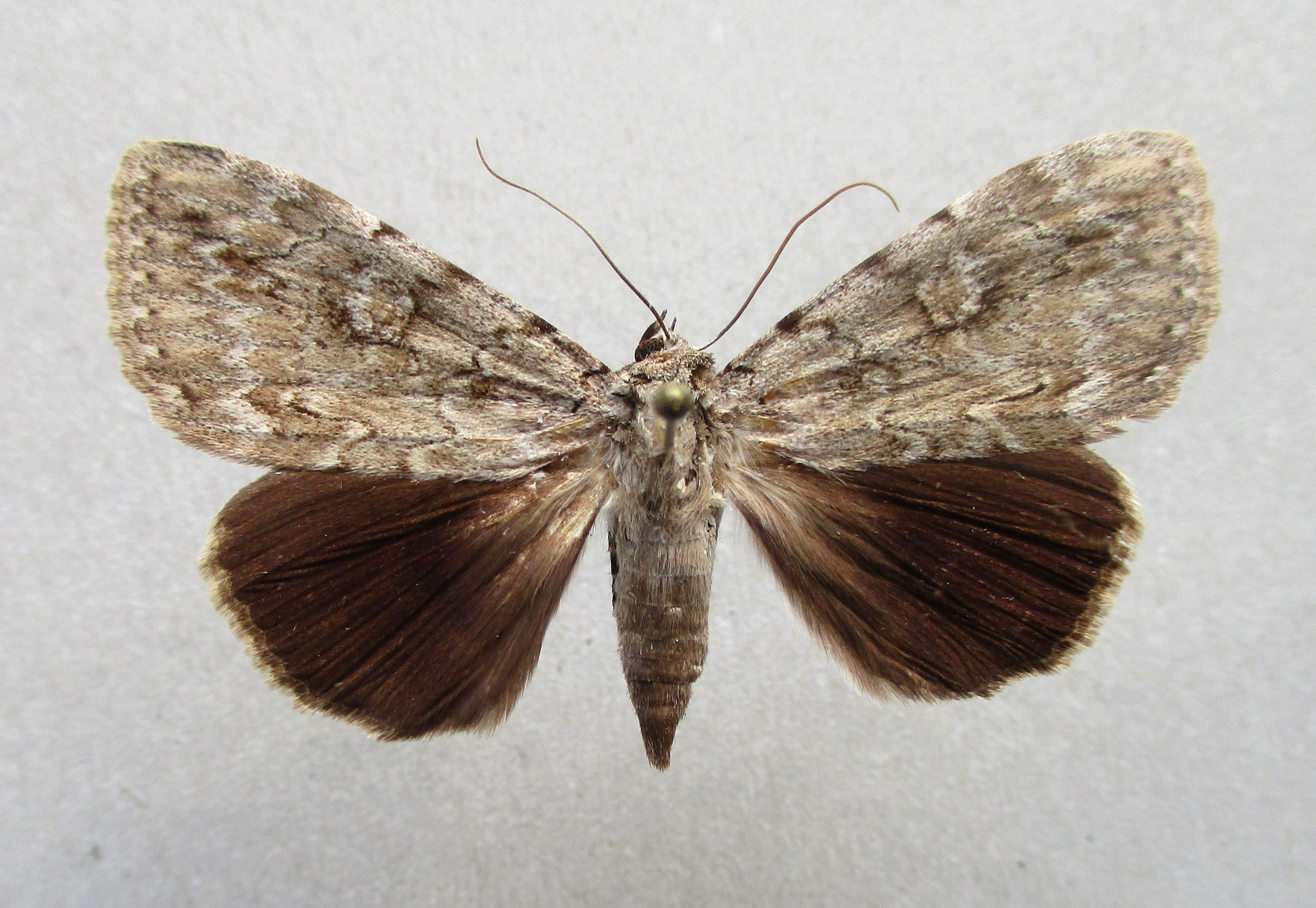
Catocala judith
Judith's underwing

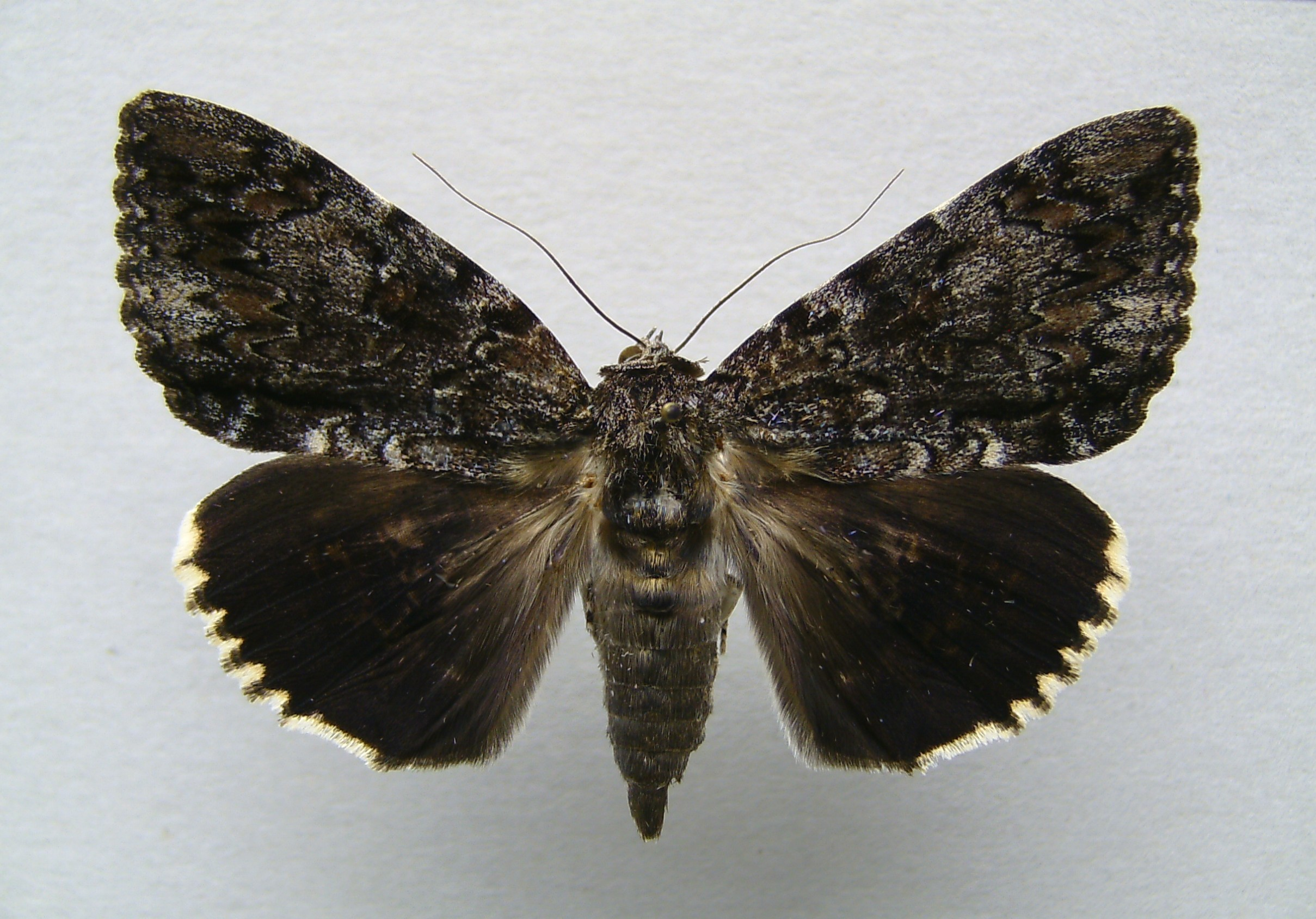
Catocala lacrymosa
tearful underwing

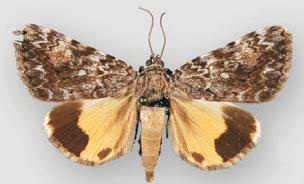
Catocala lineella
lineella underwing

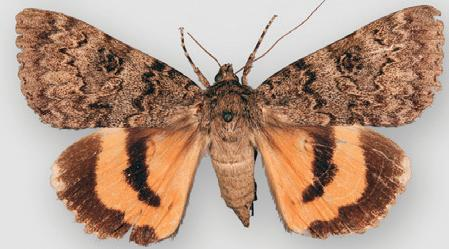
Catocala luciana
shining underwing

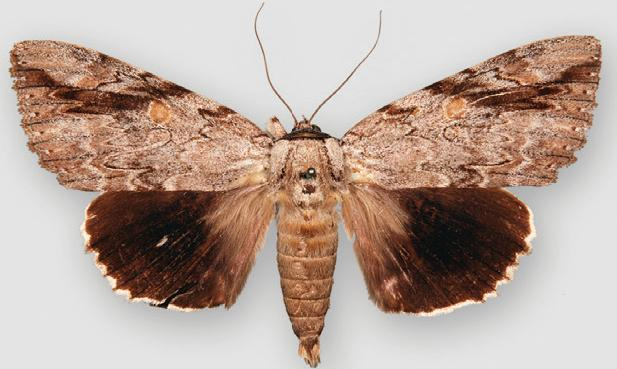
Catocala maestosa
sad underwing

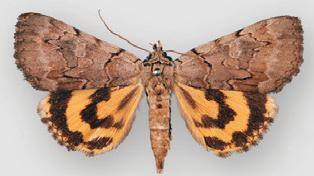
Catocala manitoba
Manitoba underwing

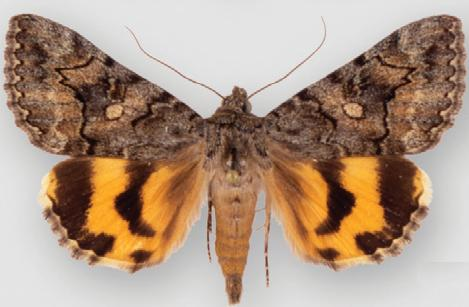
Catocala mcdunnoughi
McDunnough's underwing

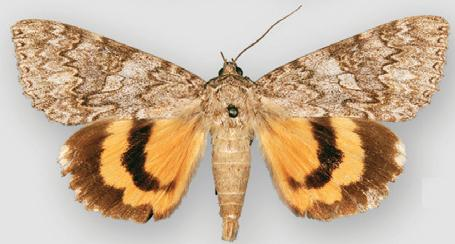
Catocala meskei f. rosalinda
Meske's underwing

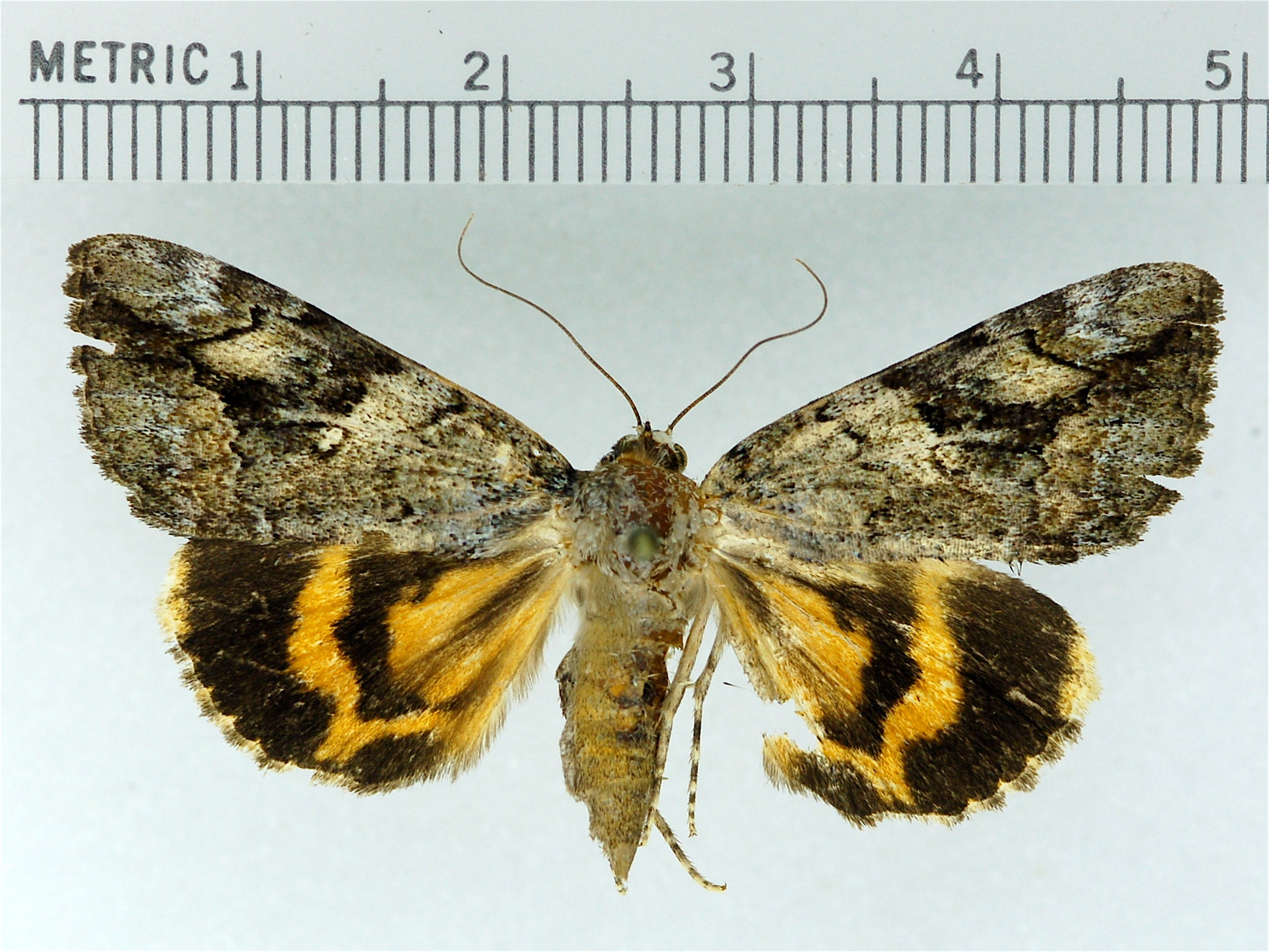
Catocala micronympha
little nymph underwing

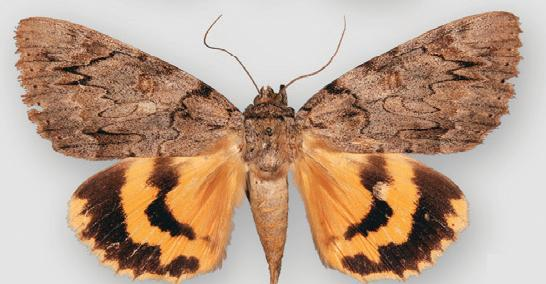
Catocala neogama euphemia
the bride

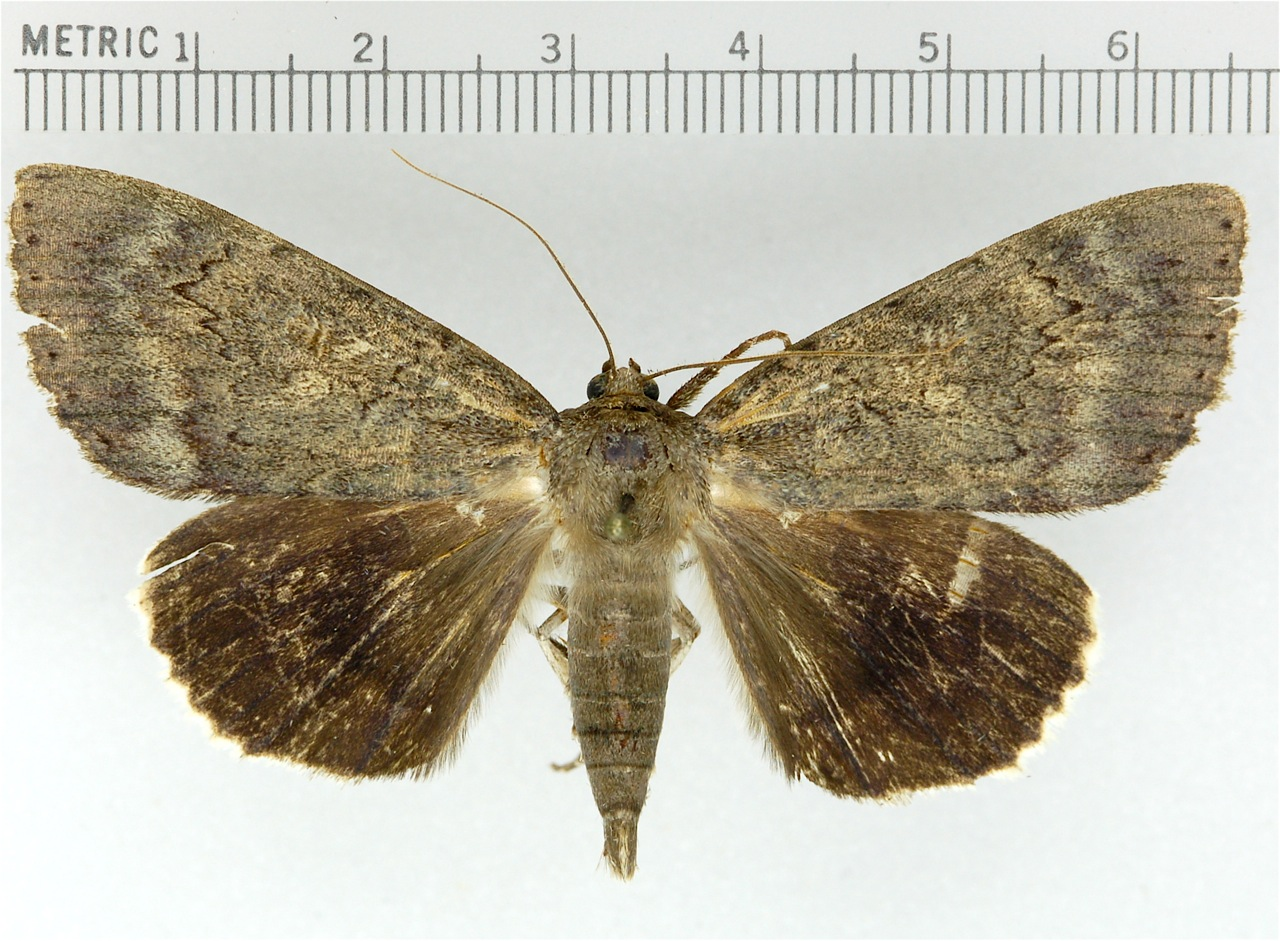
Catocala obscura
obscure underwing

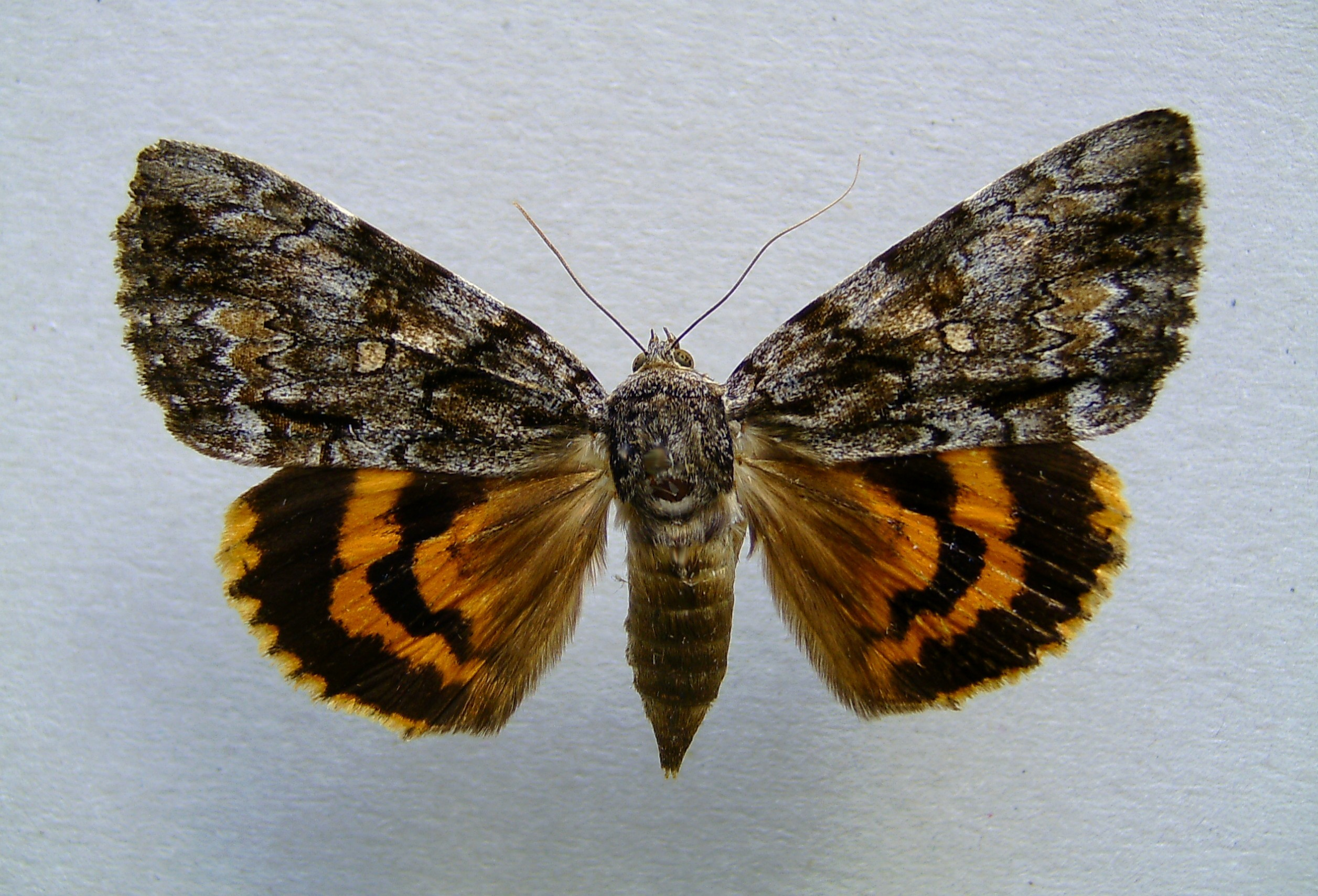
Catocala palaeogama
old wife underwing

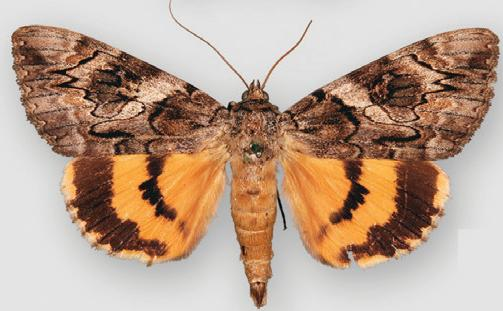
Catocala piatrix dionyza
penitent underwing

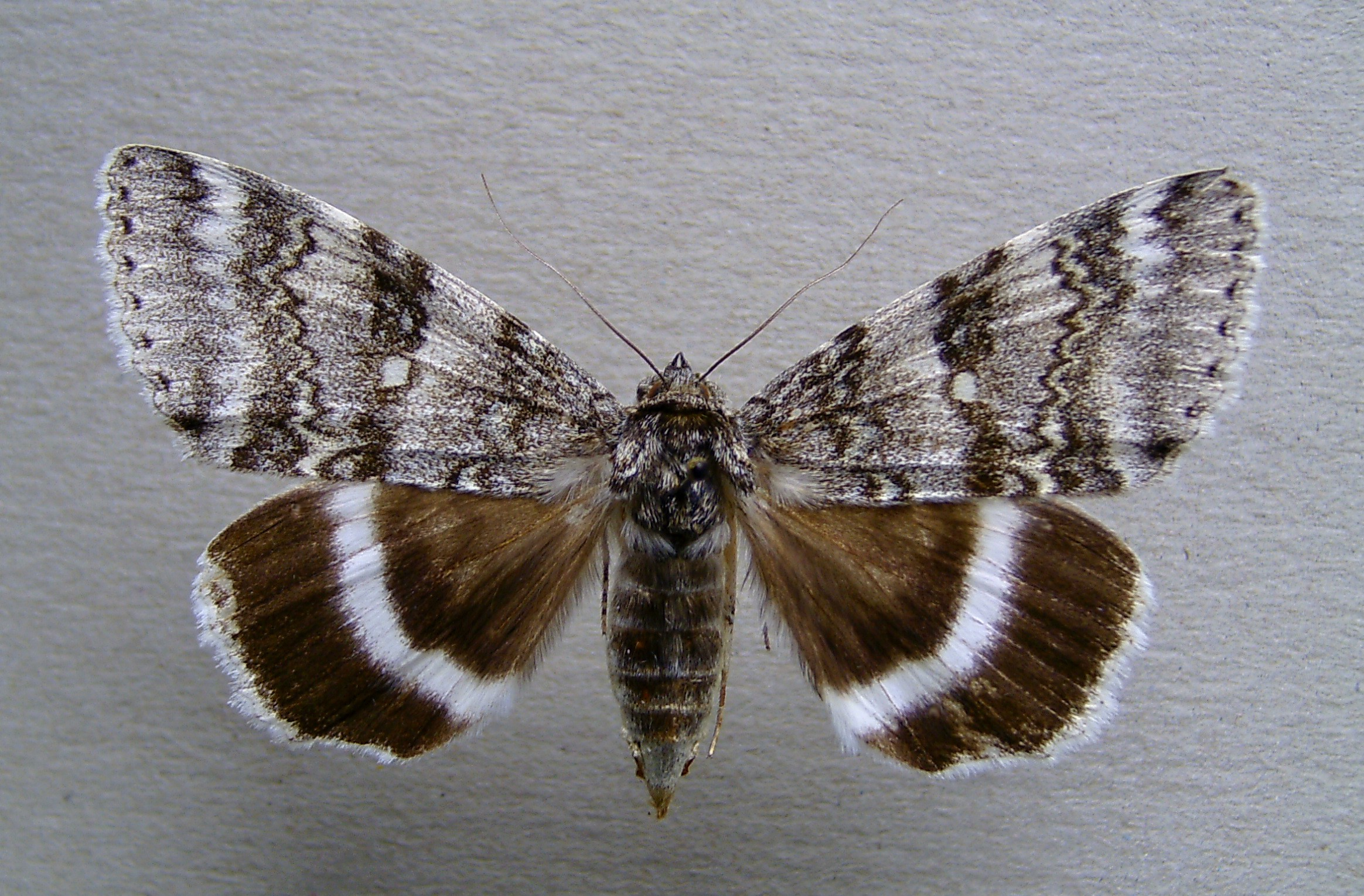
Catocala relicta
the relict

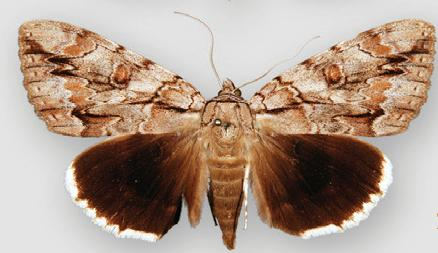
Catocala retecta luctuosa
yellow-fringed underwing

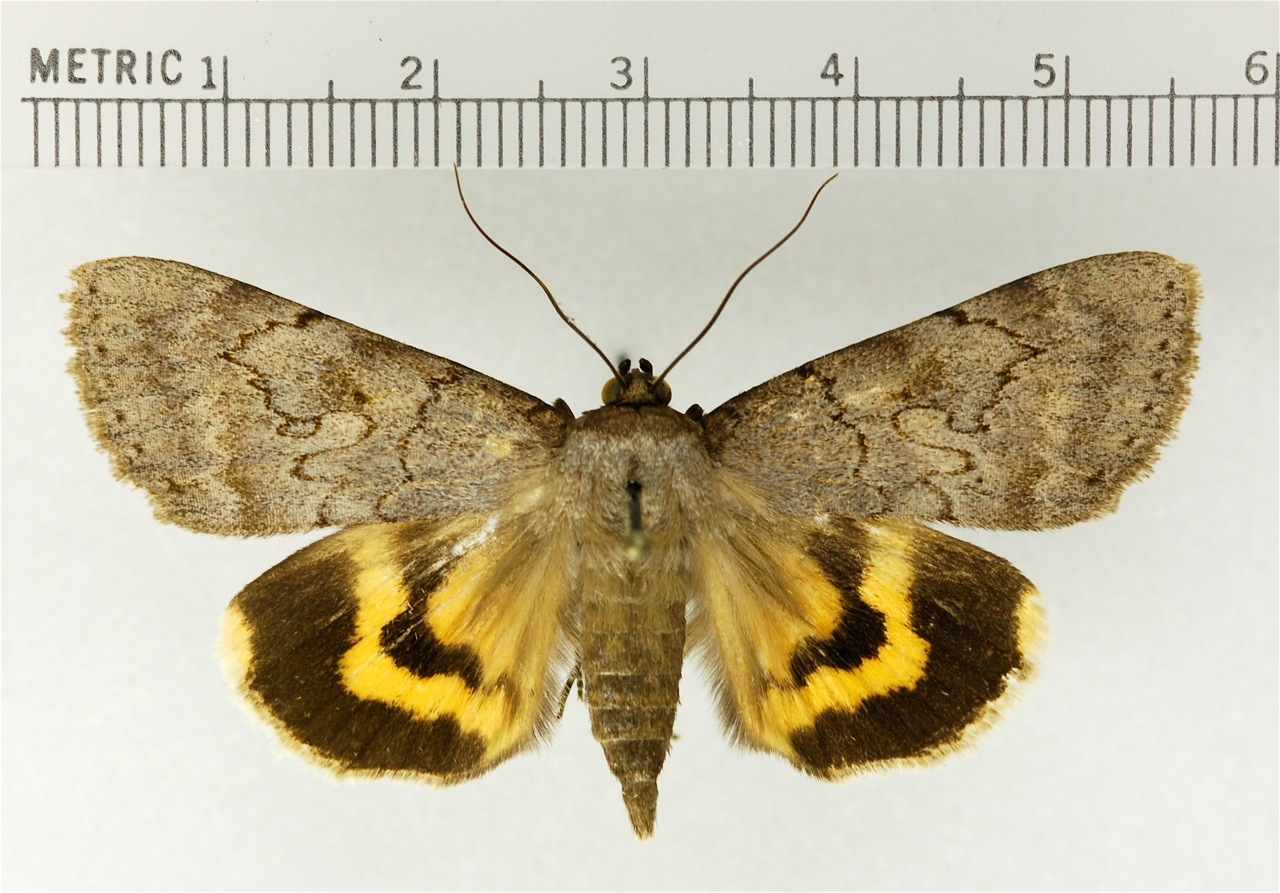
Catocala serena
serene underwing

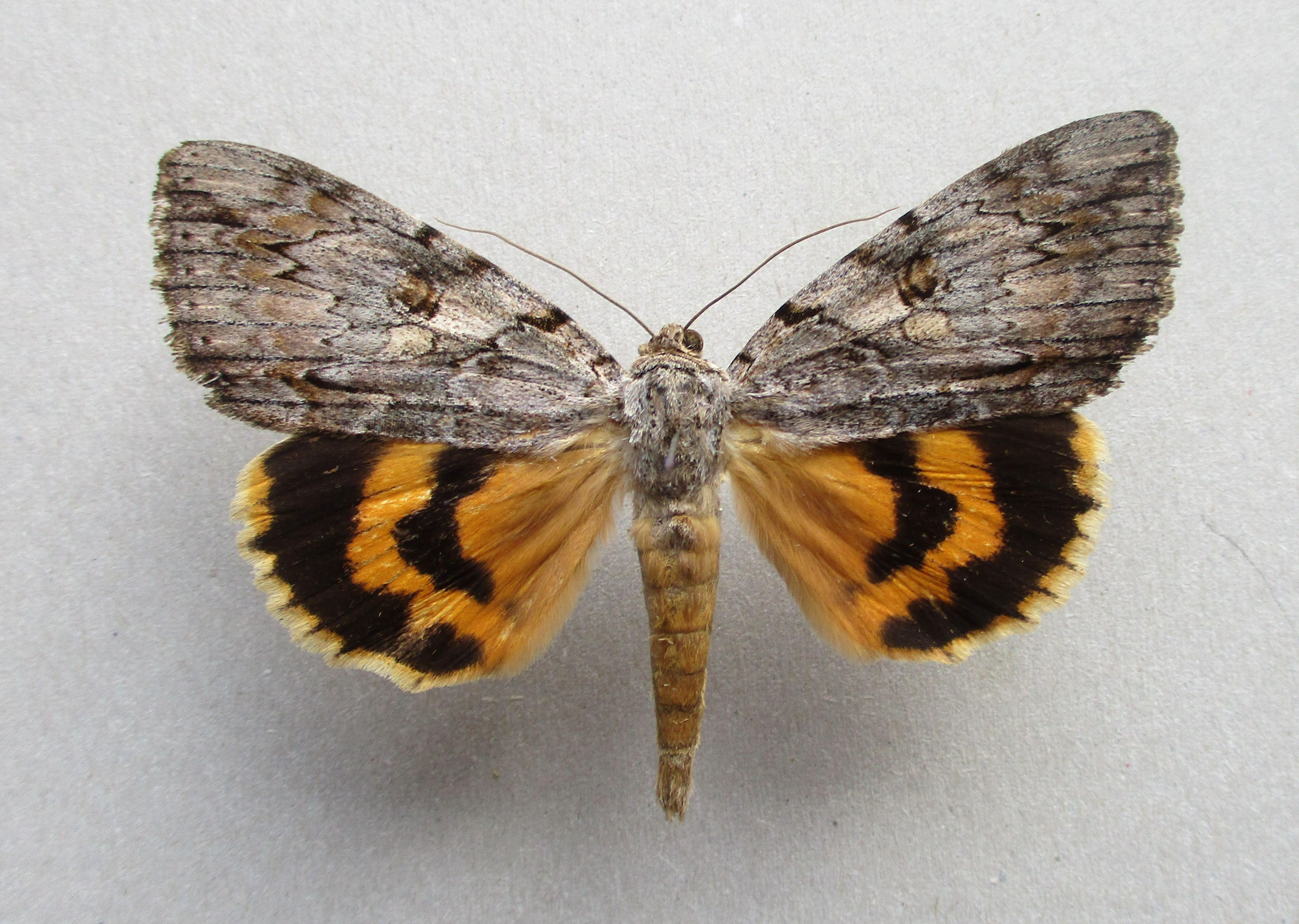
Catocala subnata
youthful underwing

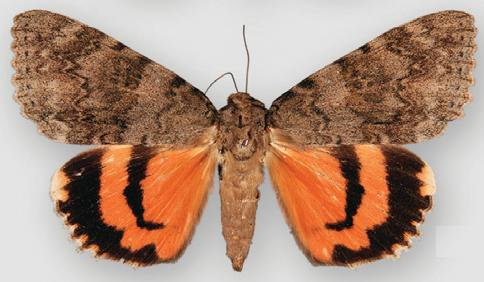
Catocala texanae
Texan underwing

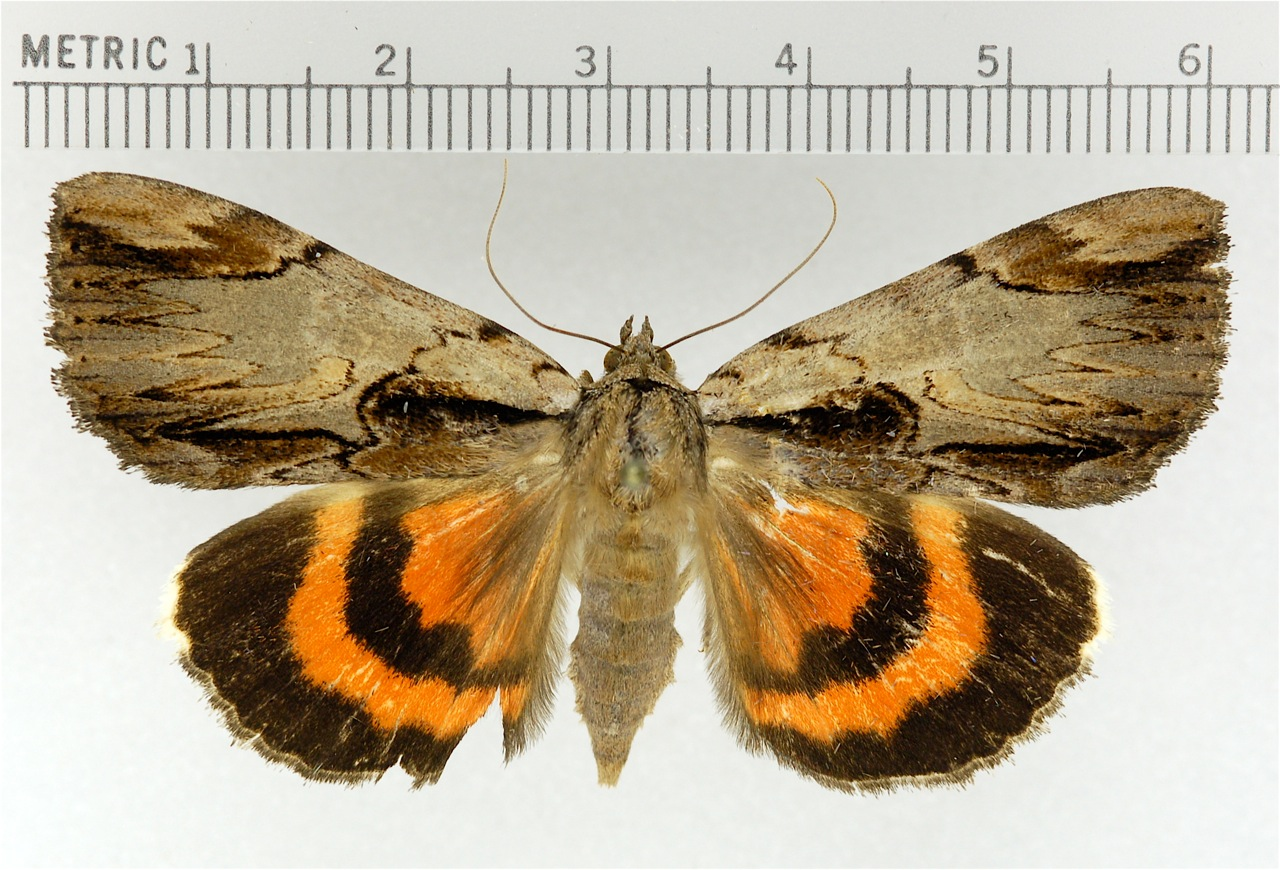
Catocala ultronia
dark red underwing

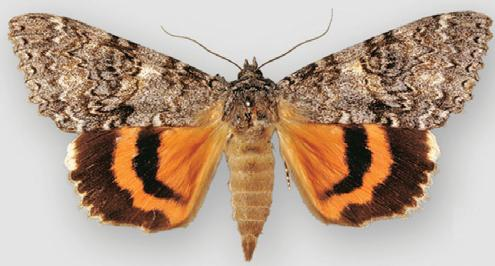
Catocala unijuga
once-married underwing

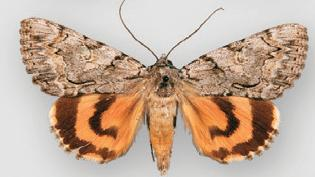
Catocala verrilliana f. beutenmuelleri
Verrill's underwing

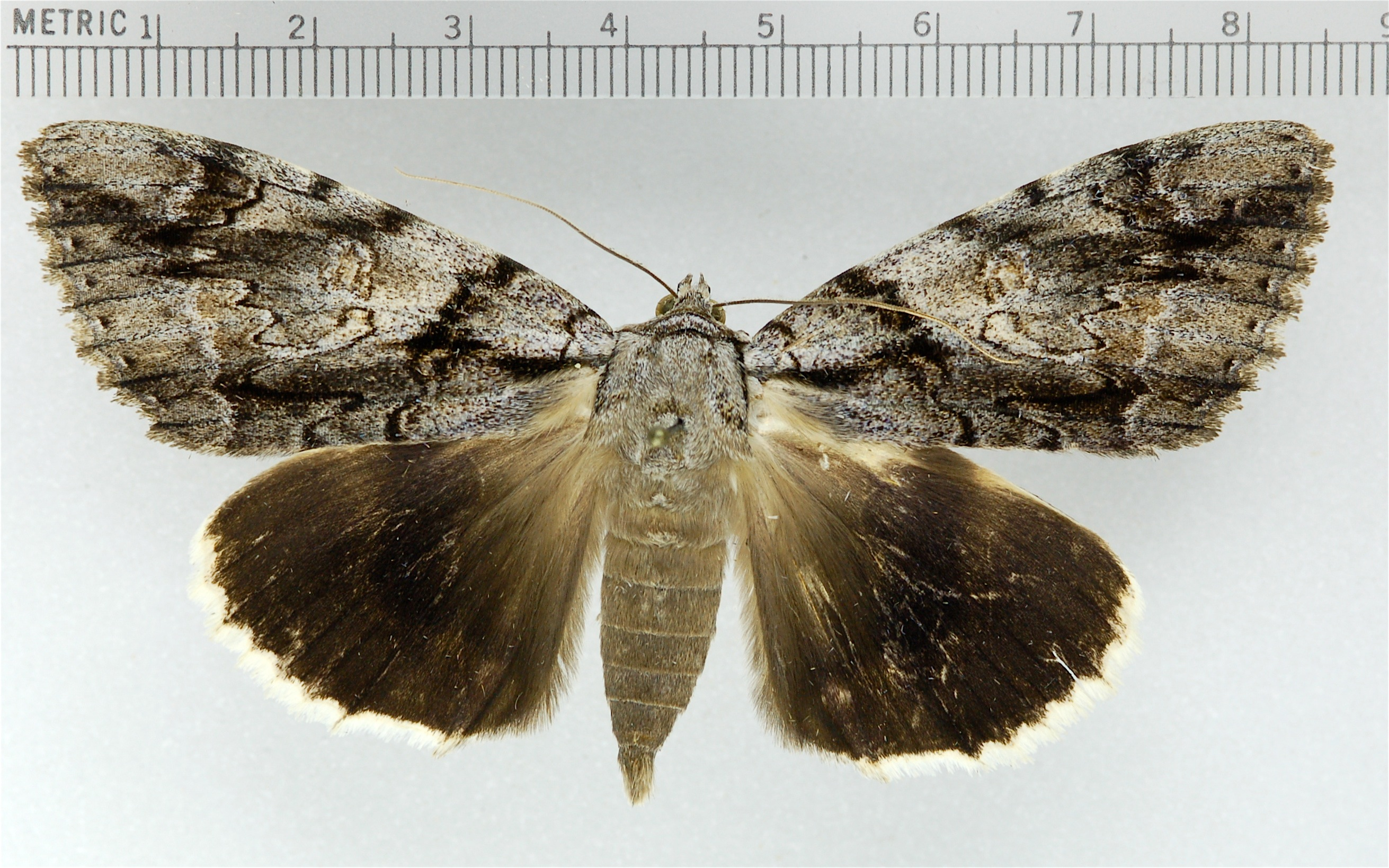
Catocala vidua
widow underwing

== Other "underwing moths" ==
As noted in the introduction, some species besides the Catocala species are also commonly known as "underwings". Typically however, the name is used with a qualifier, such as a color term, in these cases. Non-Catocala "underwing moths" are typically owlet moths, namely:
Subfamily Catocalinae

- Beautiful yellow underwing (Anarta myrtilli)
- Brown underwing (Minucia lunaris)
- Locust underwing (Euparthenos nubilis)
- (European) white underwing (Catephia alchymista) – in North America, "white underwing" typically refers to Catocala relicta

Subfamily Amphipyrinae

- Copper underwing (Amphipyra pyramidea)
- Svensson's copper underwing (Amphipyra berbera)

Subfamily Erebinae

- False underwing moth (Allotria elonympha)

Subfamily Hadeninae

- Black underwing (Mormo maura)
- Blossom underwing (Orthosia miniosa)
- Broad-bordered white underwing (Hadula melanopa)
- Guernsey underwing (Polyphaenis sericata)
- Lunar underwing (Omphaloscelis lunosa)
- Small dark yellow underwing (Coranarta cordigera)
- Small yellow underwing (Panemeria tenebrata)
- Straw underwing (Thalpophila matura)

Subfamily Noctuinae

- Pearly underwing (Peridroma saucia)
- Yellow underwings proper, some 15 species in the genus Noctua

However, the "orange underwings" are two species of genus Archiearis of the geometer moth family (Geometridae):

- Orange underwing (Archiearis parthenias)
- Light orange underwing (Archiearis notha)
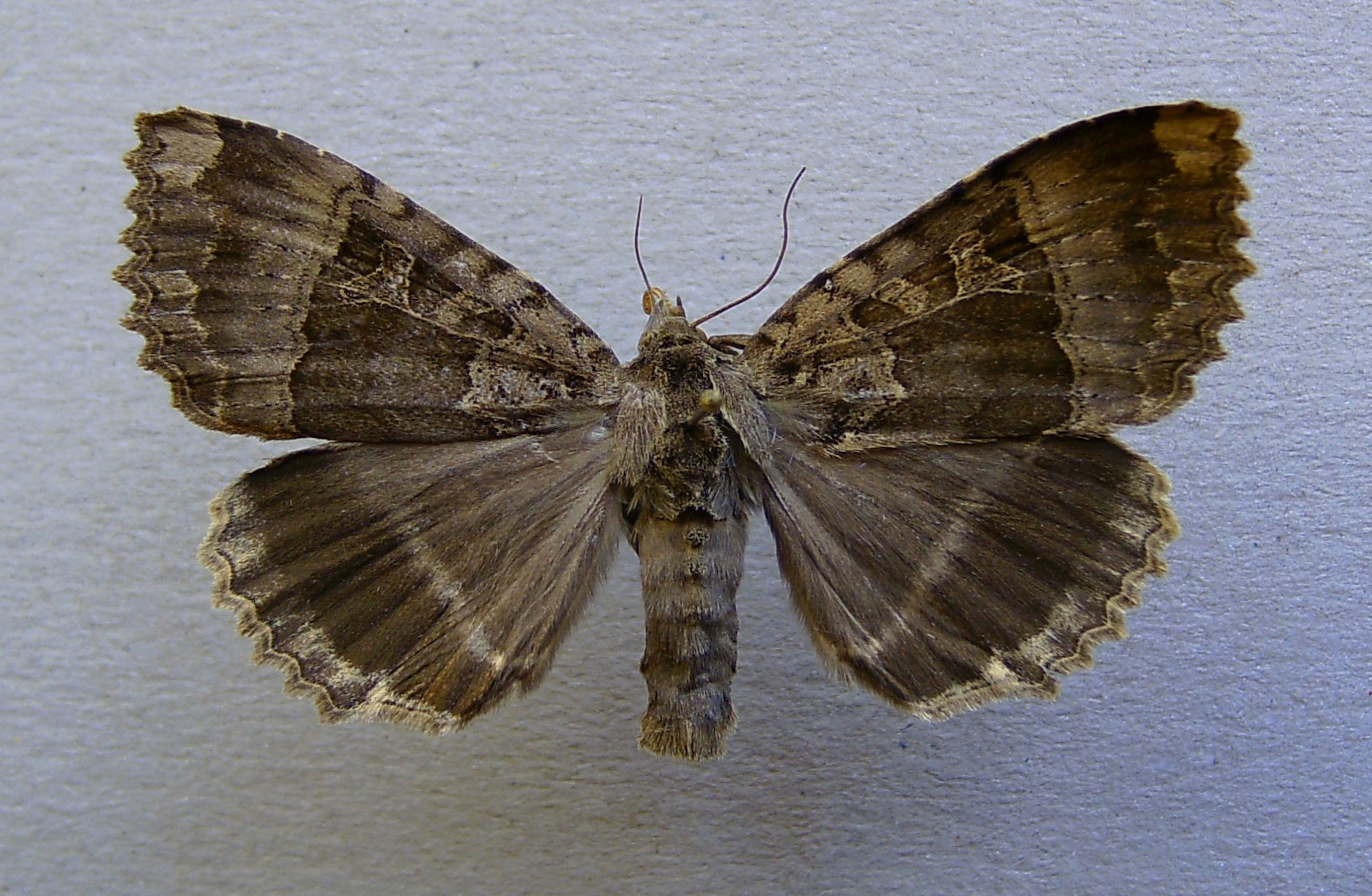
Black underwing
Mormo maura
Hadeninae

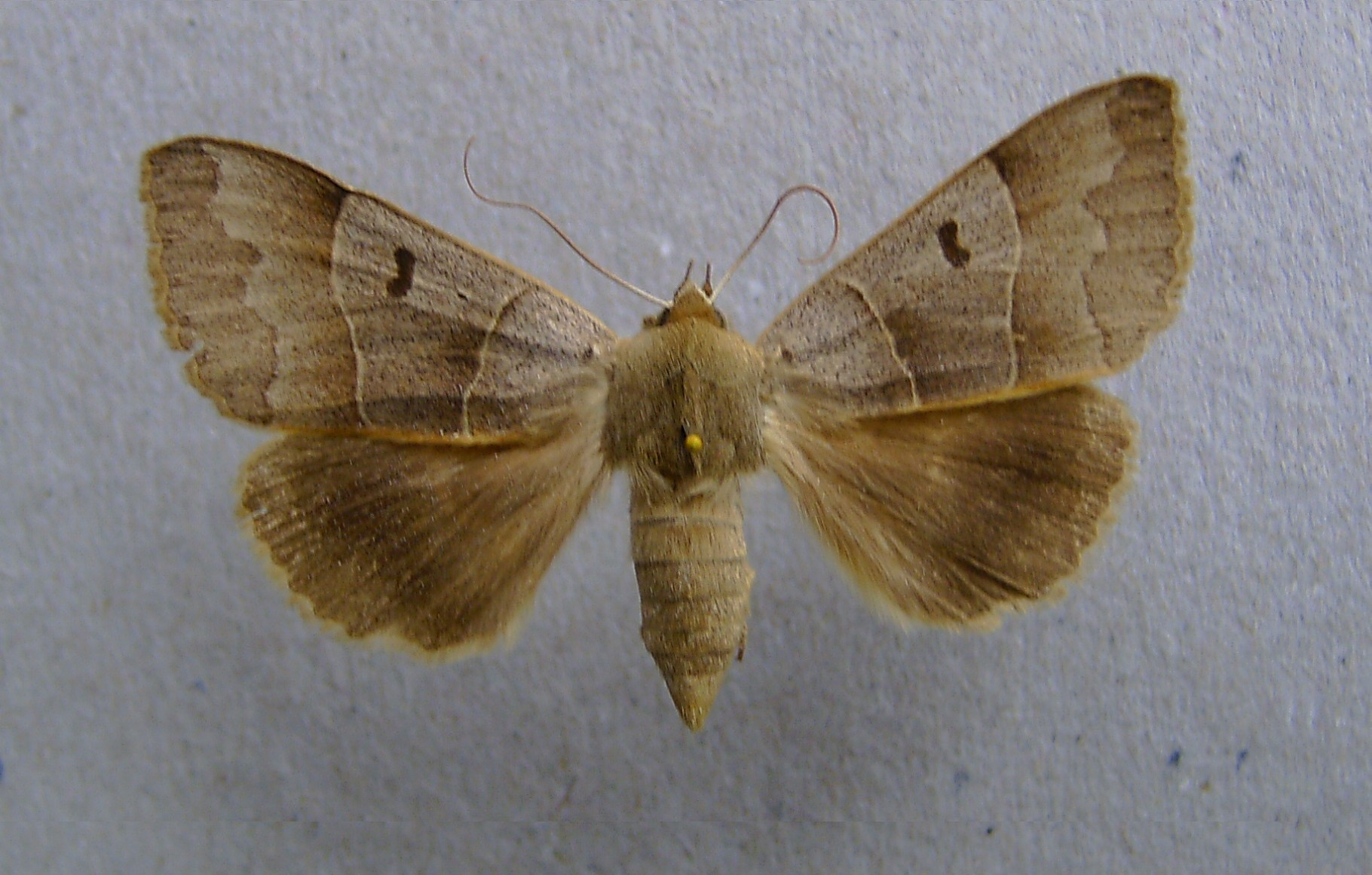
Brown underwing
Minucia lunaris
Catocalinae

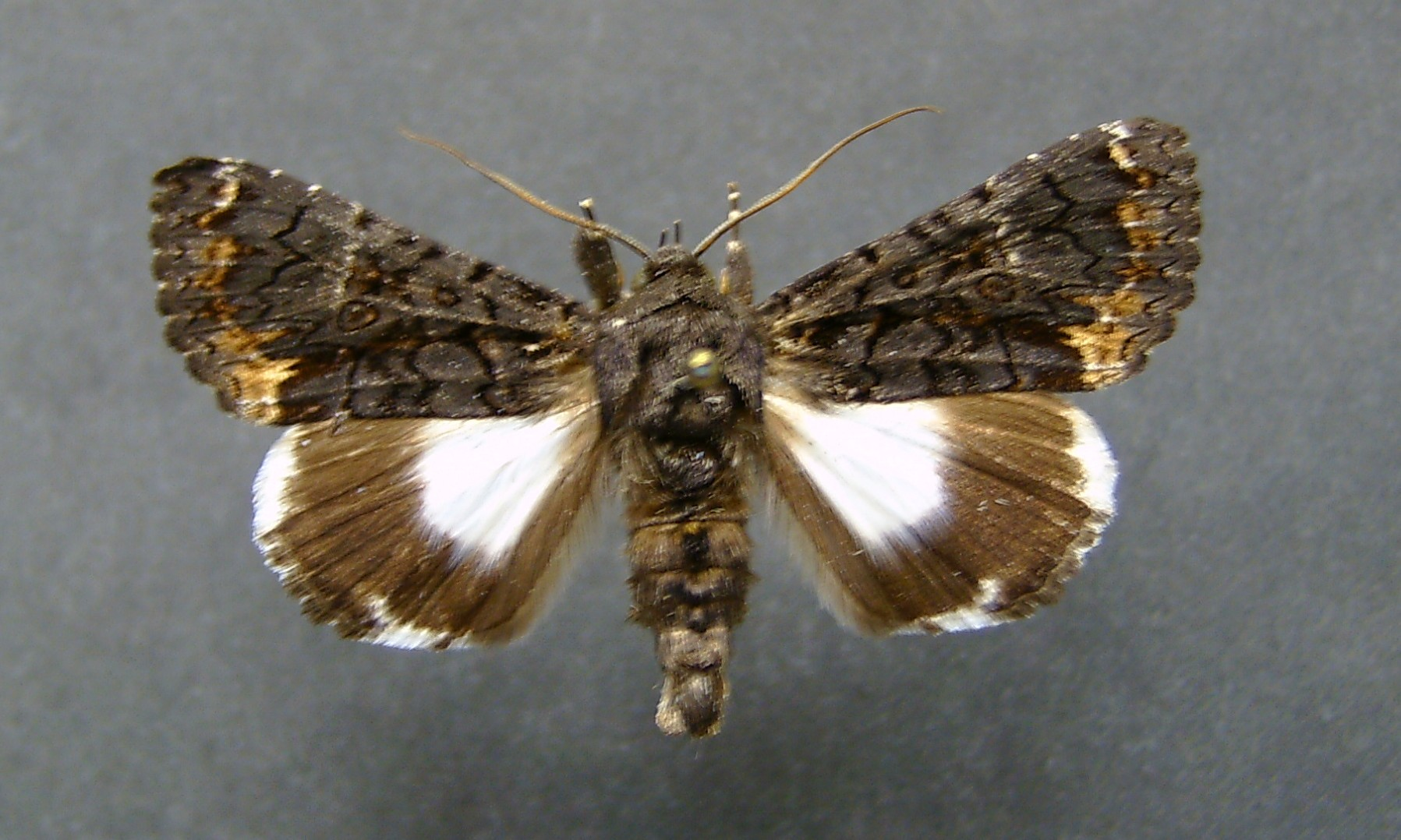
White underwing
Catephia alchymista
Catocalinae

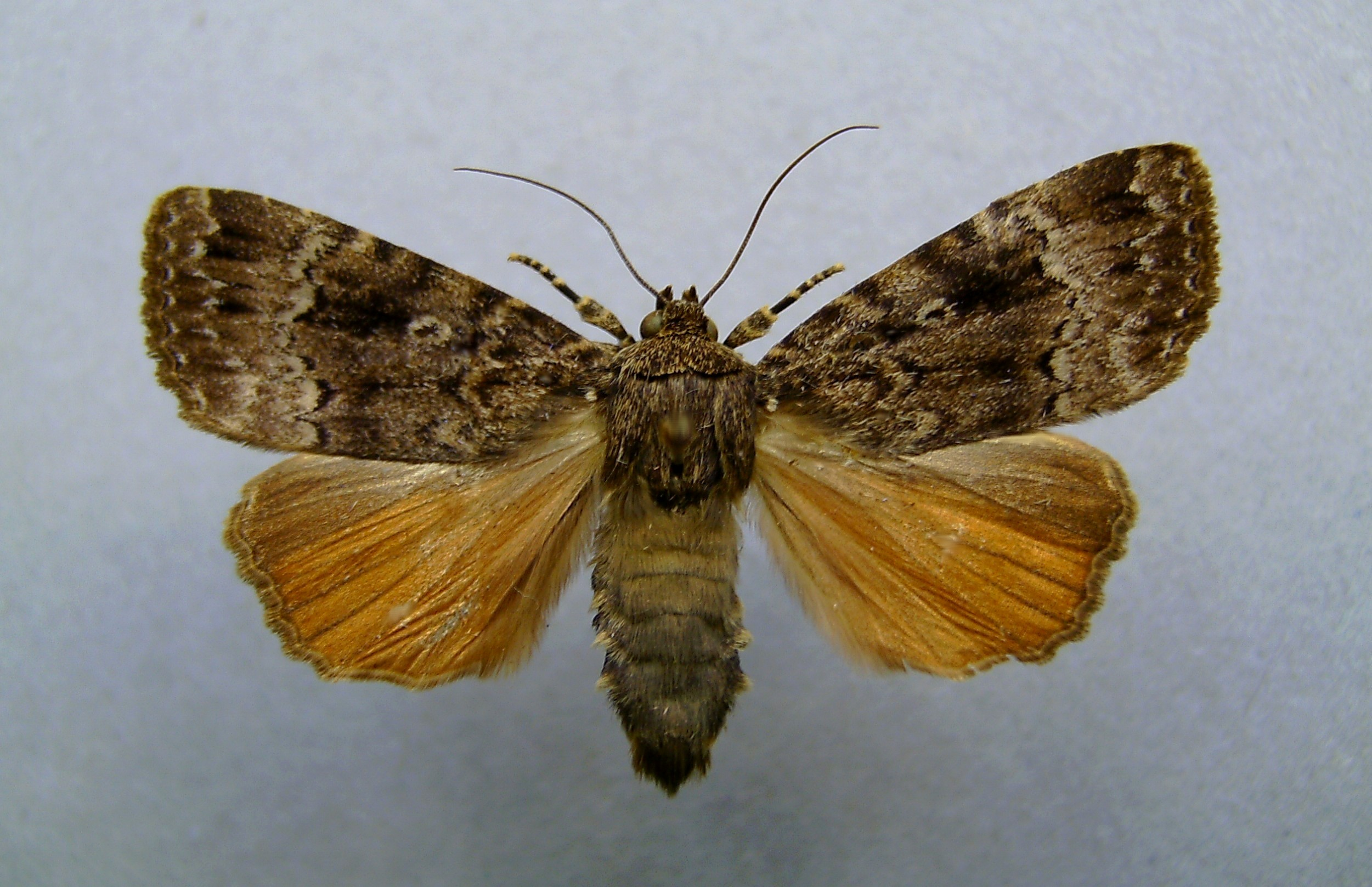
Svensson's copper underwing
Amphipyra berbera
Amphipyrinae

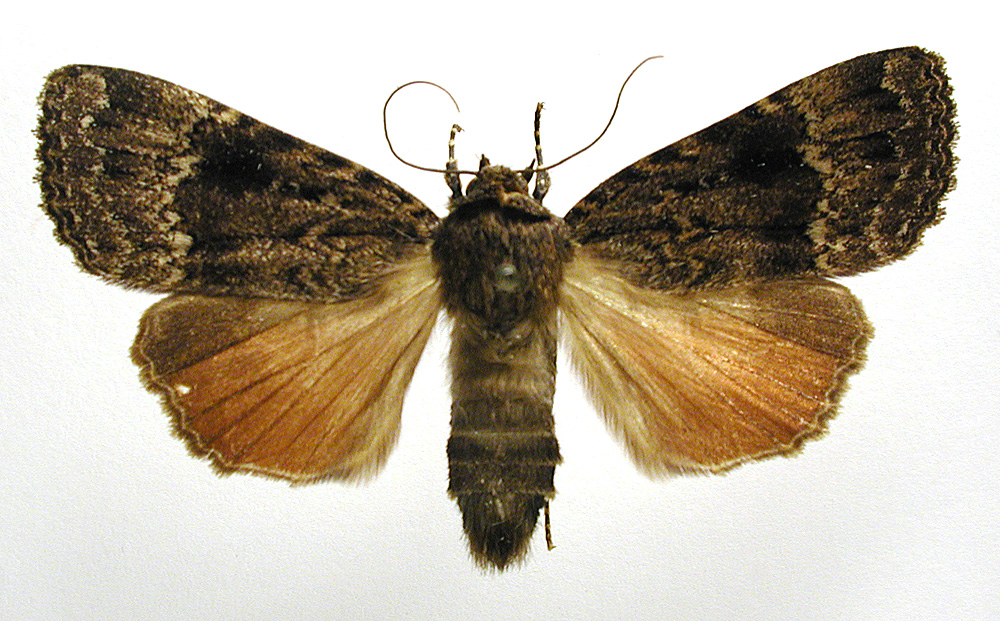
Copper underwing
Amphipyra pyramidea
Amphipyrinae

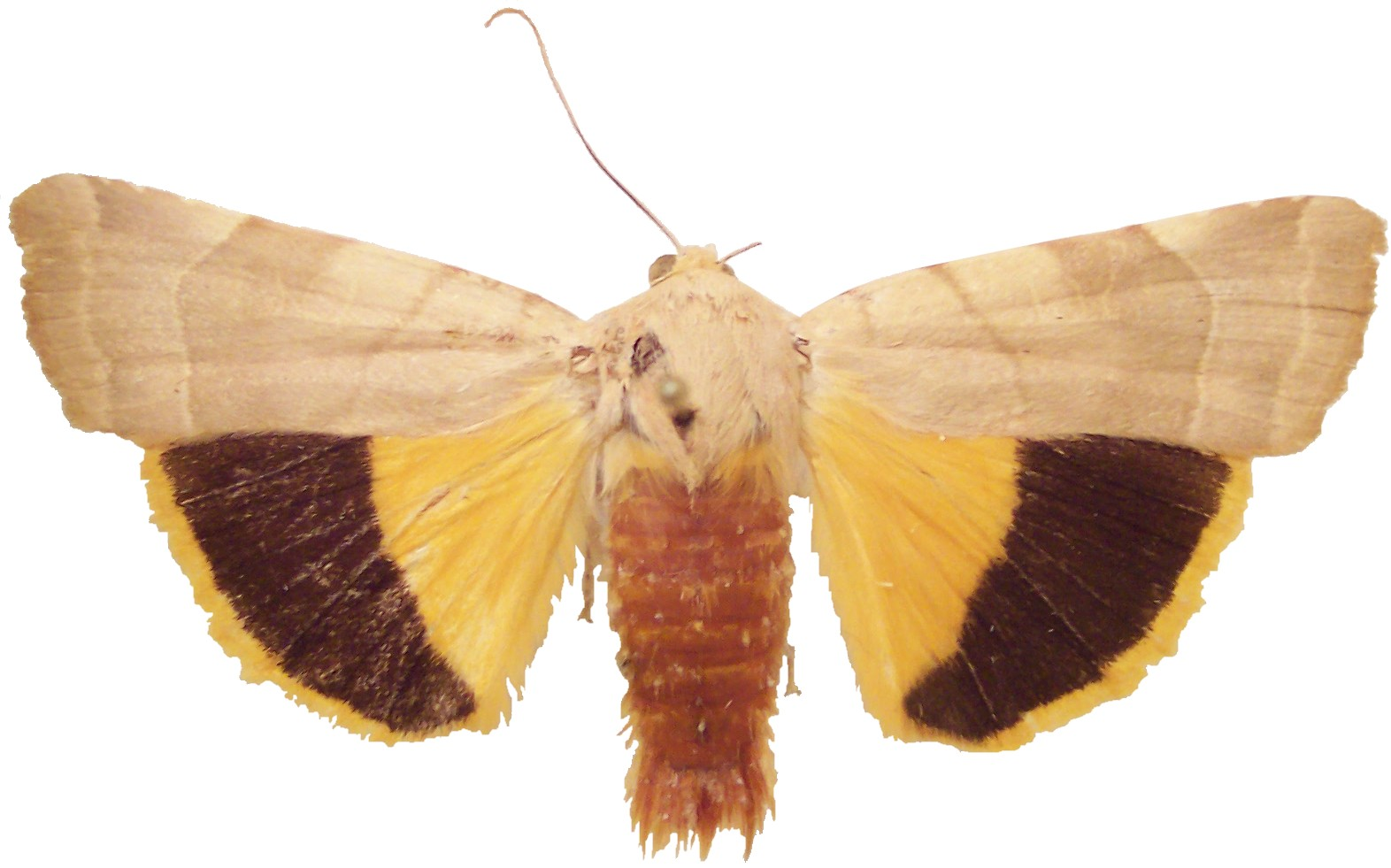
Mediterranean yellow underwing
Noctua tirrenica
Noctuinae

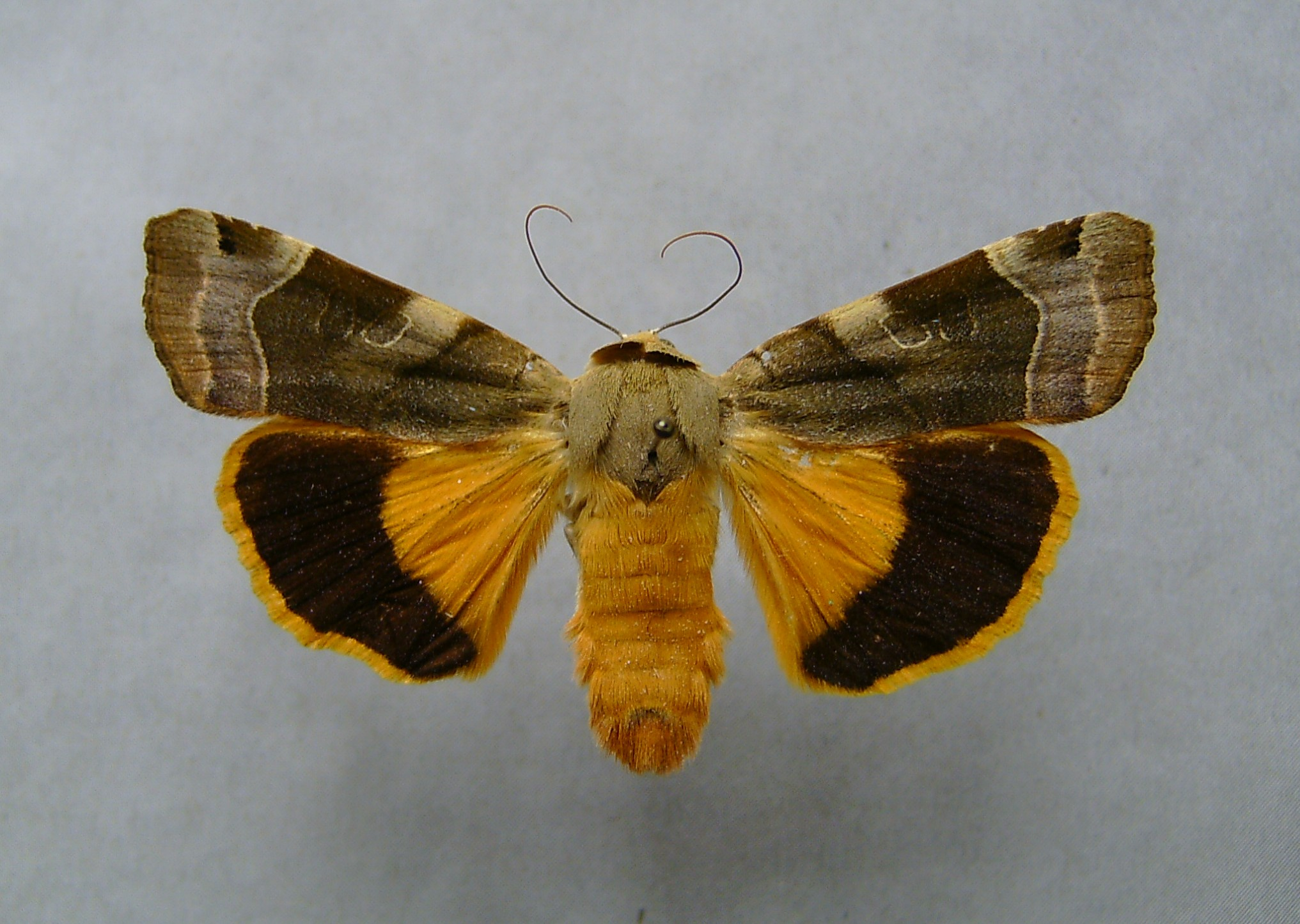
Broad-bordered yellow underwing
Noctua fimbriata
Noctuinae

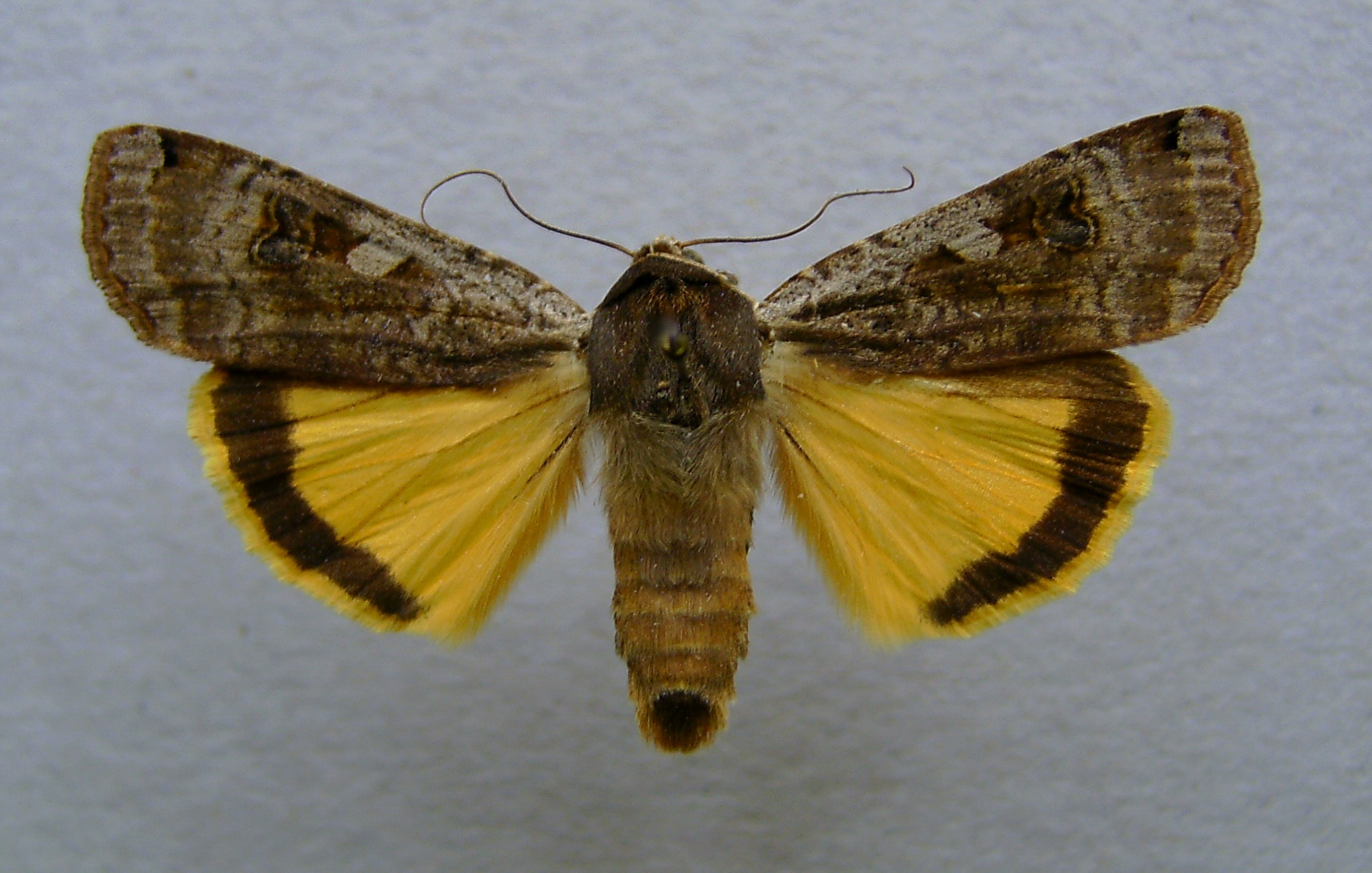
Large yellow underwing
Noctua pronuba
Noctuinae

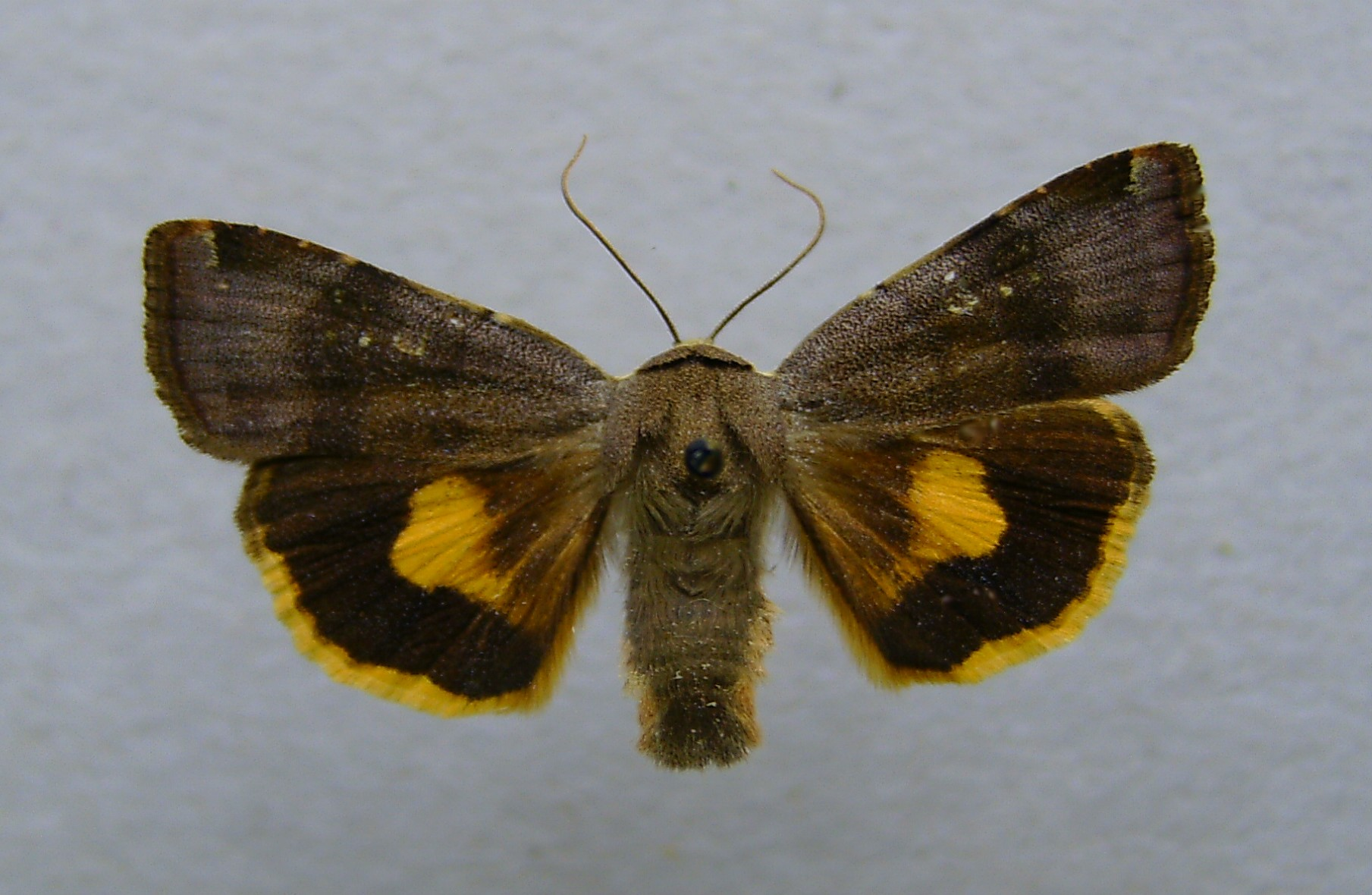
Lesser broad-bordered yellow underwing
Noctua janthina
Noctuinae

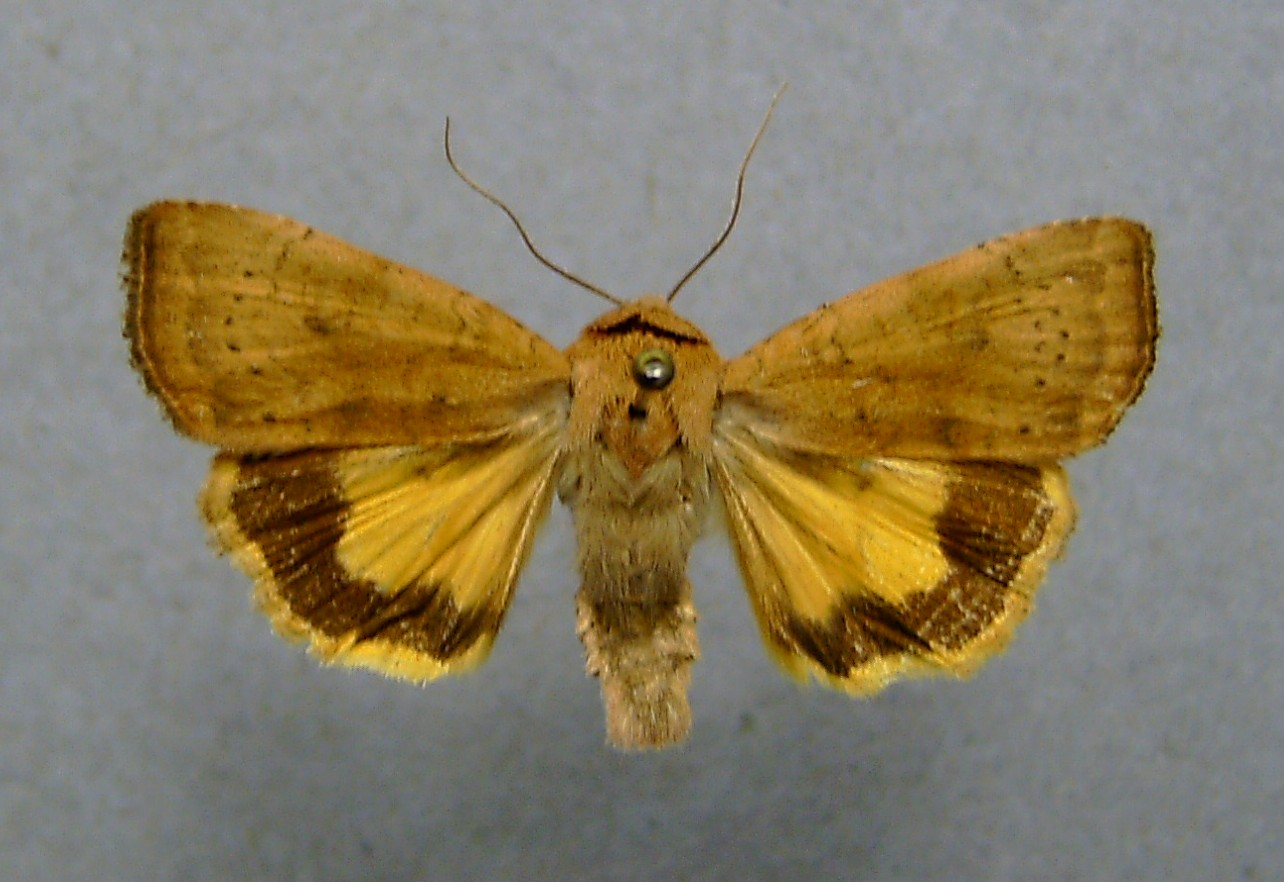
Least yellow underwing
Noctua interjecta
Noctuinae

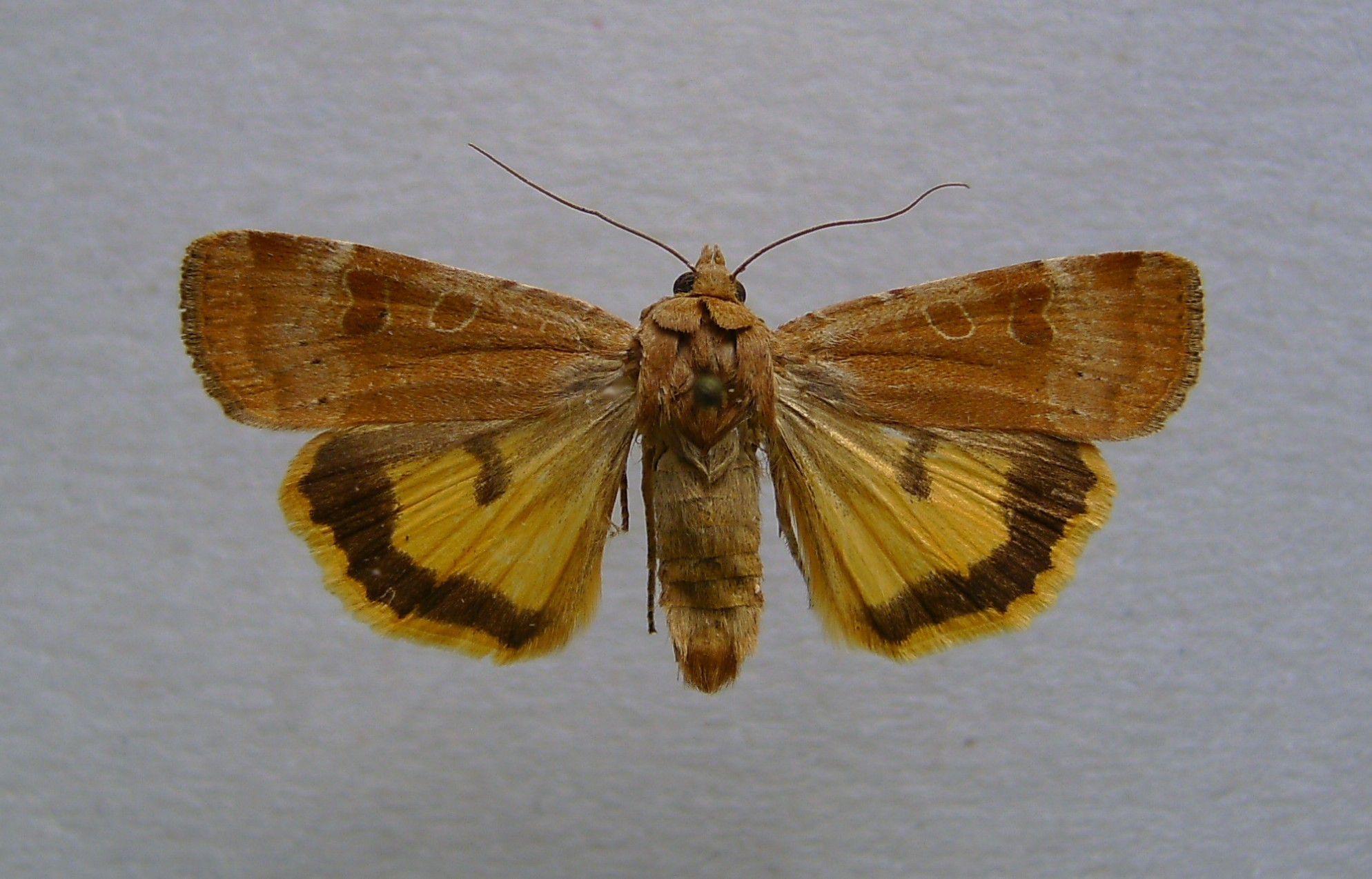
Least yellow underwing
Noctua interposita
Noctuinae

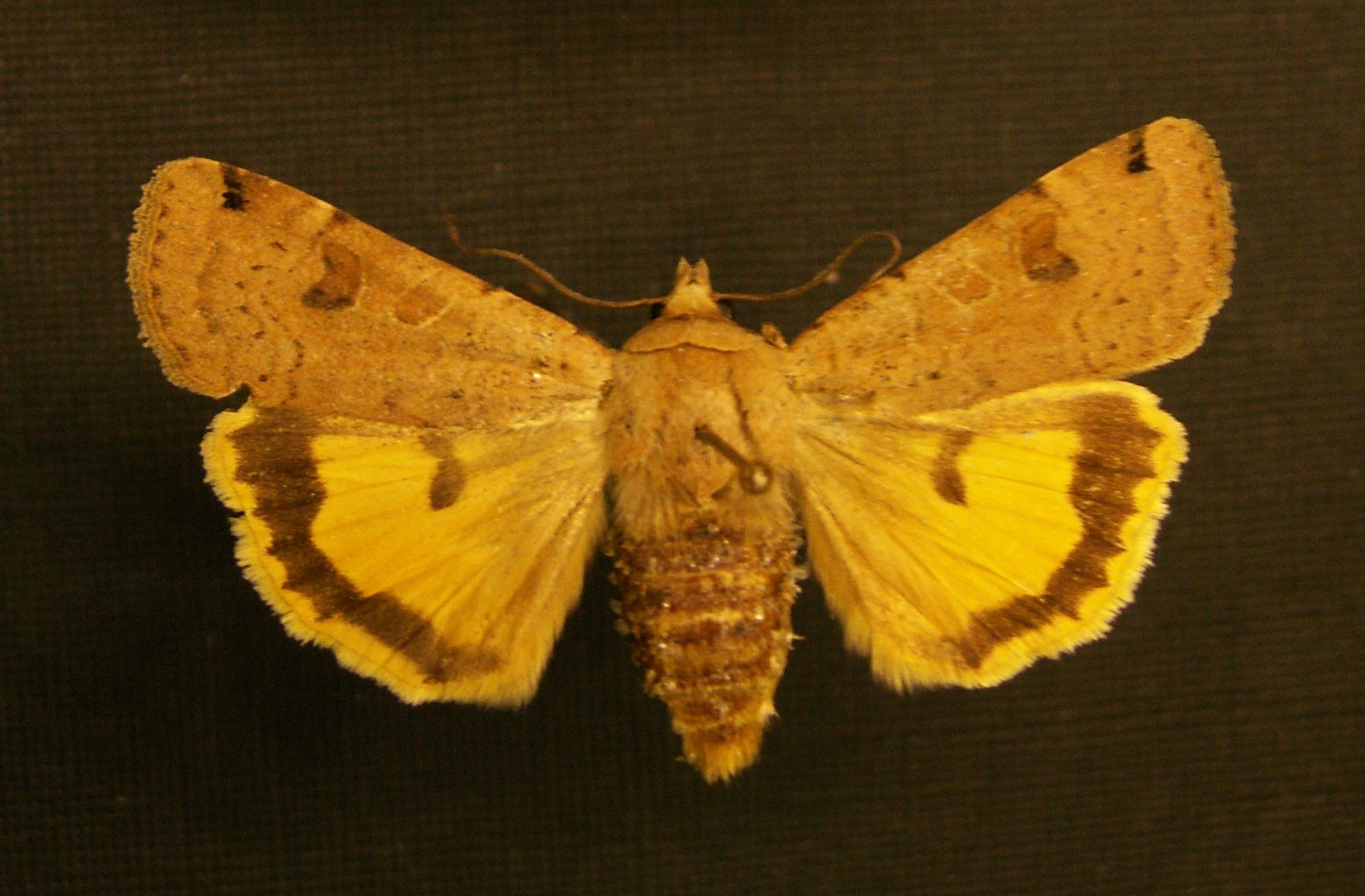
Lunar yellow underwing
Noctua orbona
Noctuinae

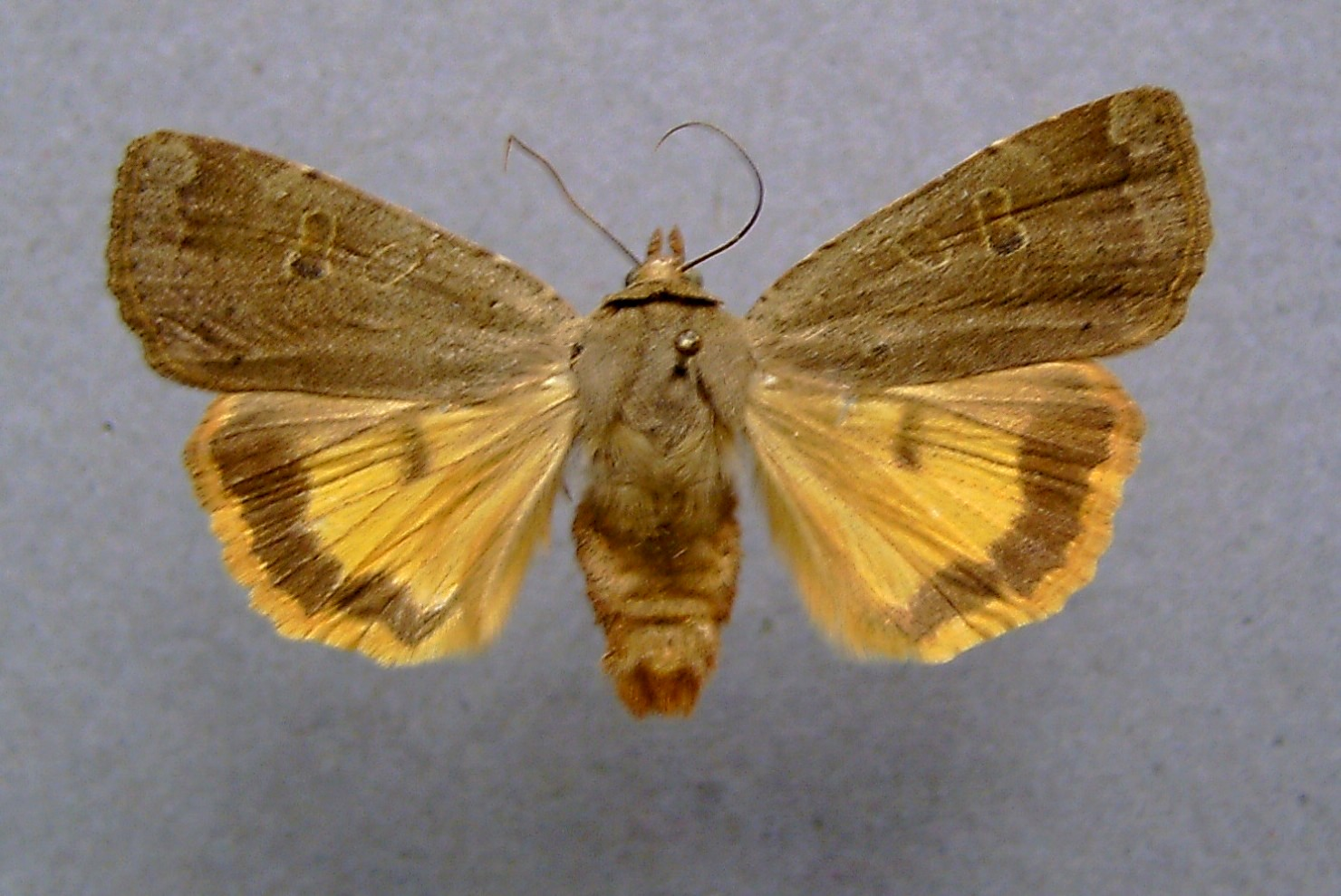
Lesser yellow underwing
Noctua comes
Noctuinae

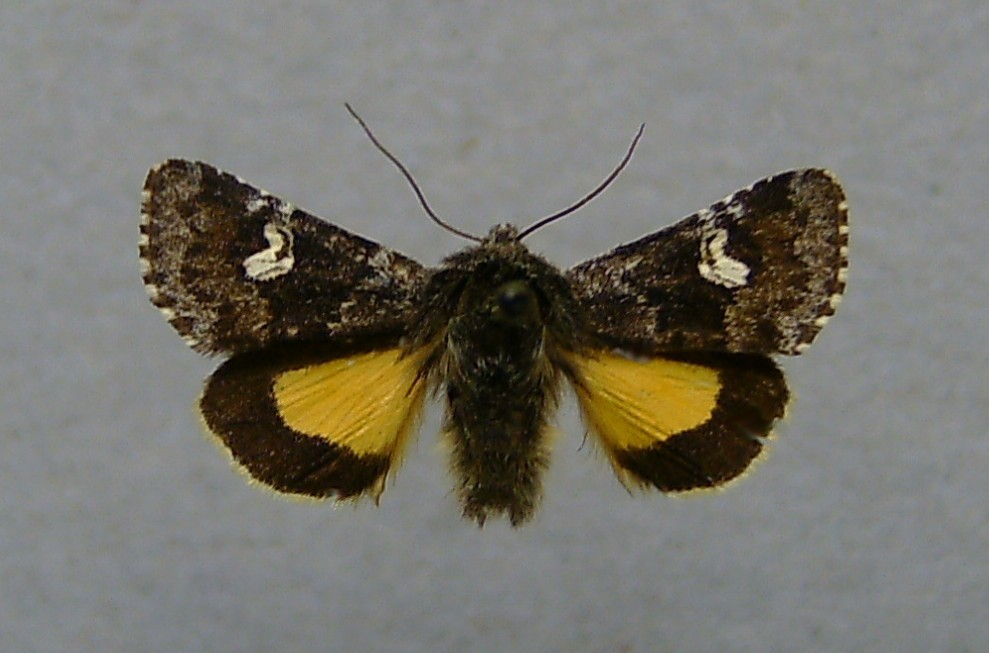
Small dark yellow underwing
Coranarta cordigera
Hadeninae

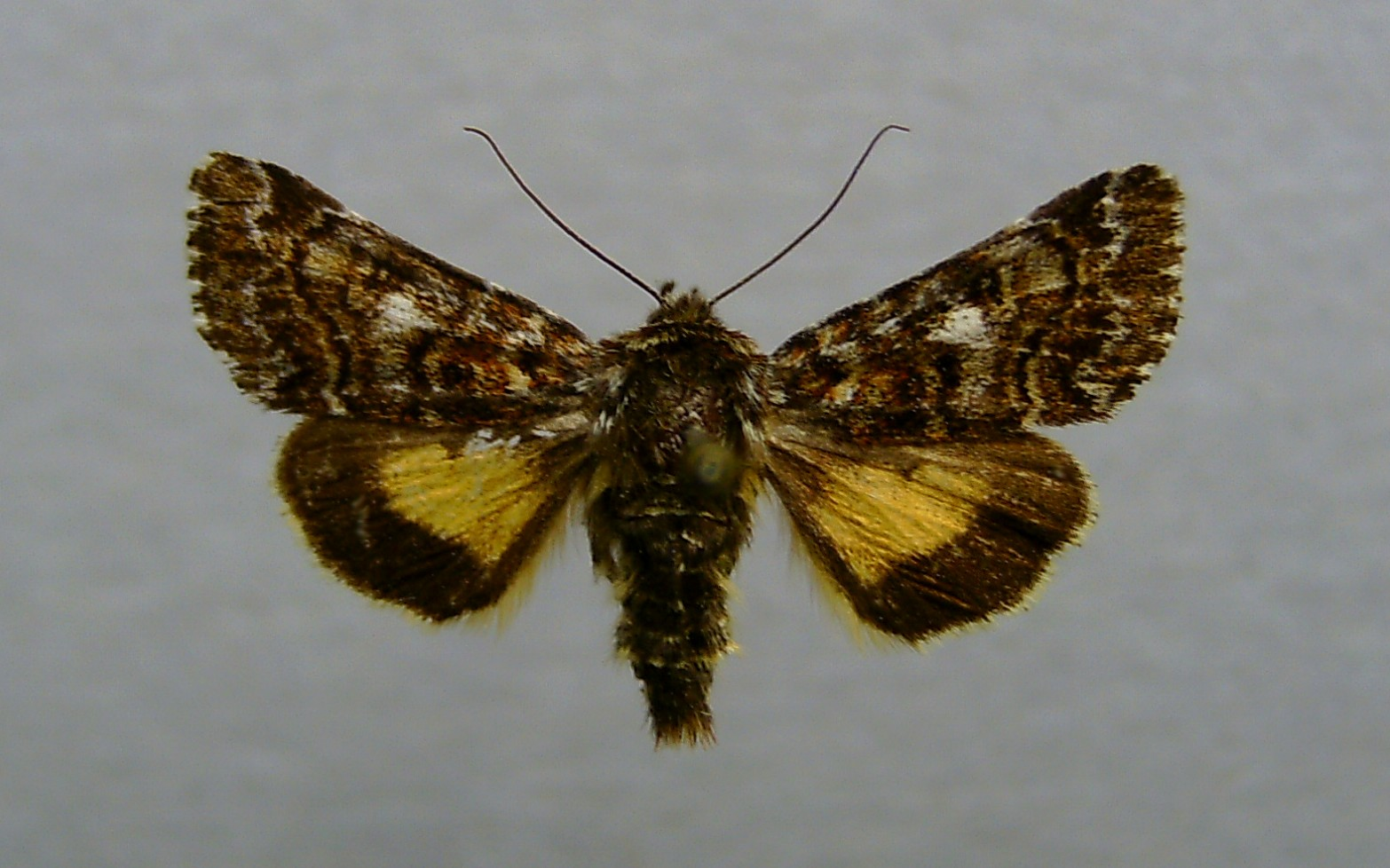
Beautiful yellow underwing
Anarta myrtilli
Catocalinae

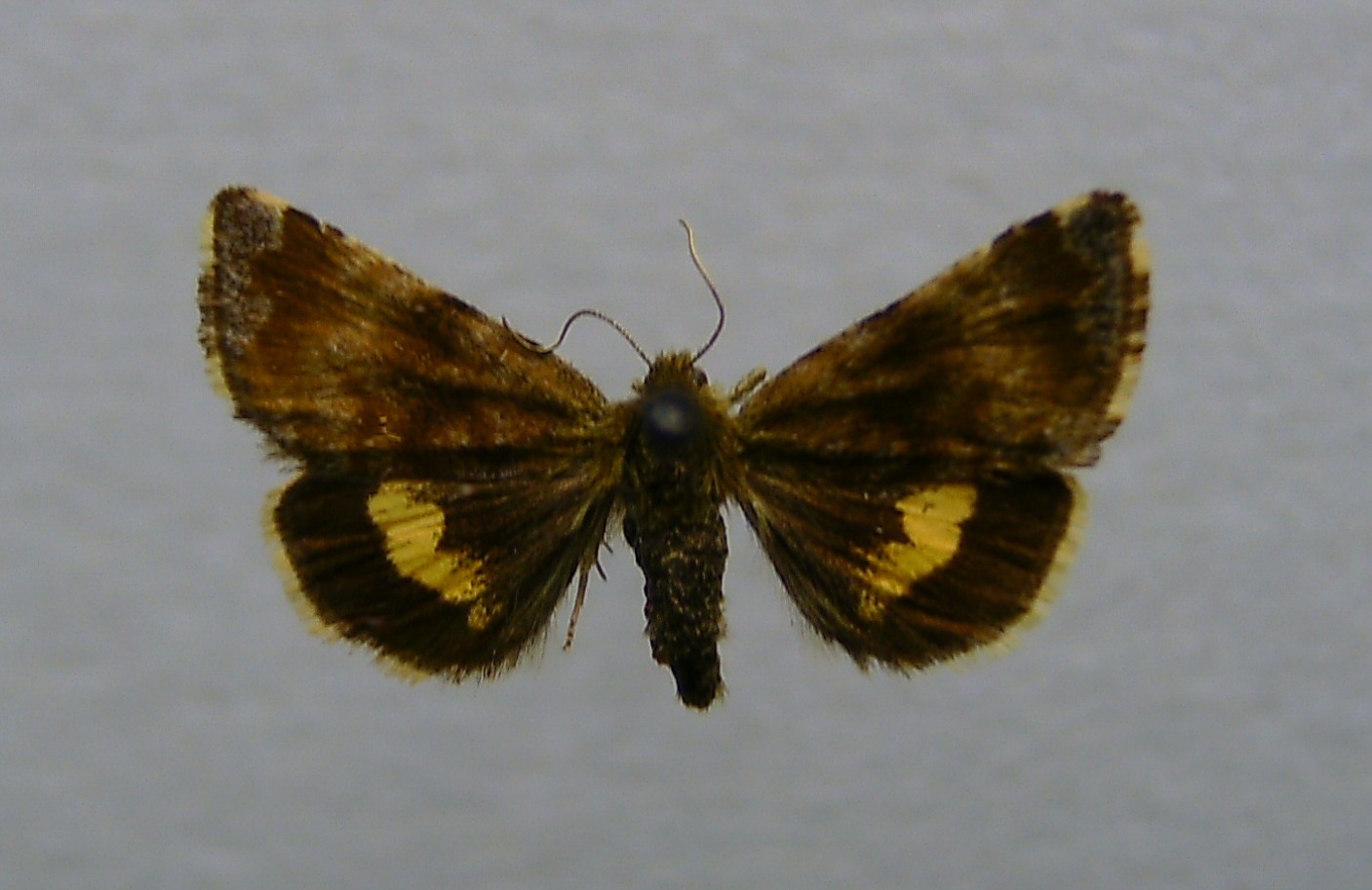
Small yellow underwing
Panemeria tenebrata
Catocalinae

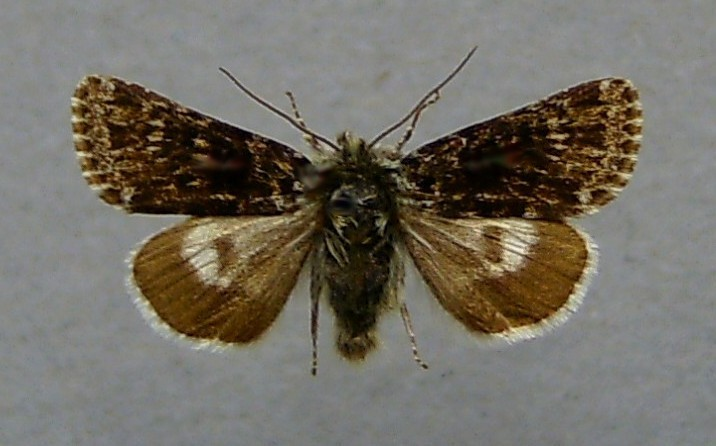
Broad-bordered white underwing
Hadula melanopa
Hadeninae

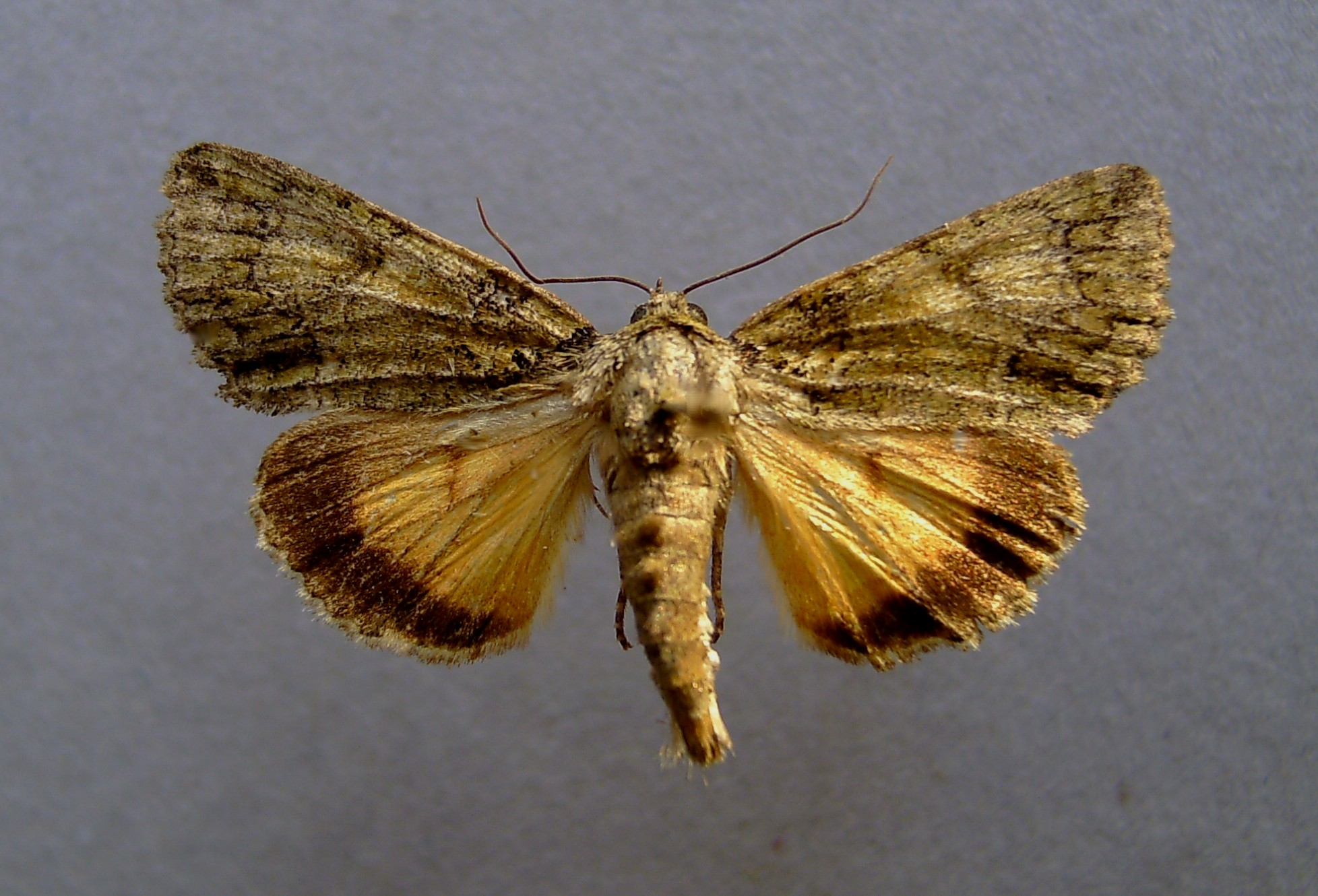
Guernsey underwing
Polyphaenis sericata
Hadeninae

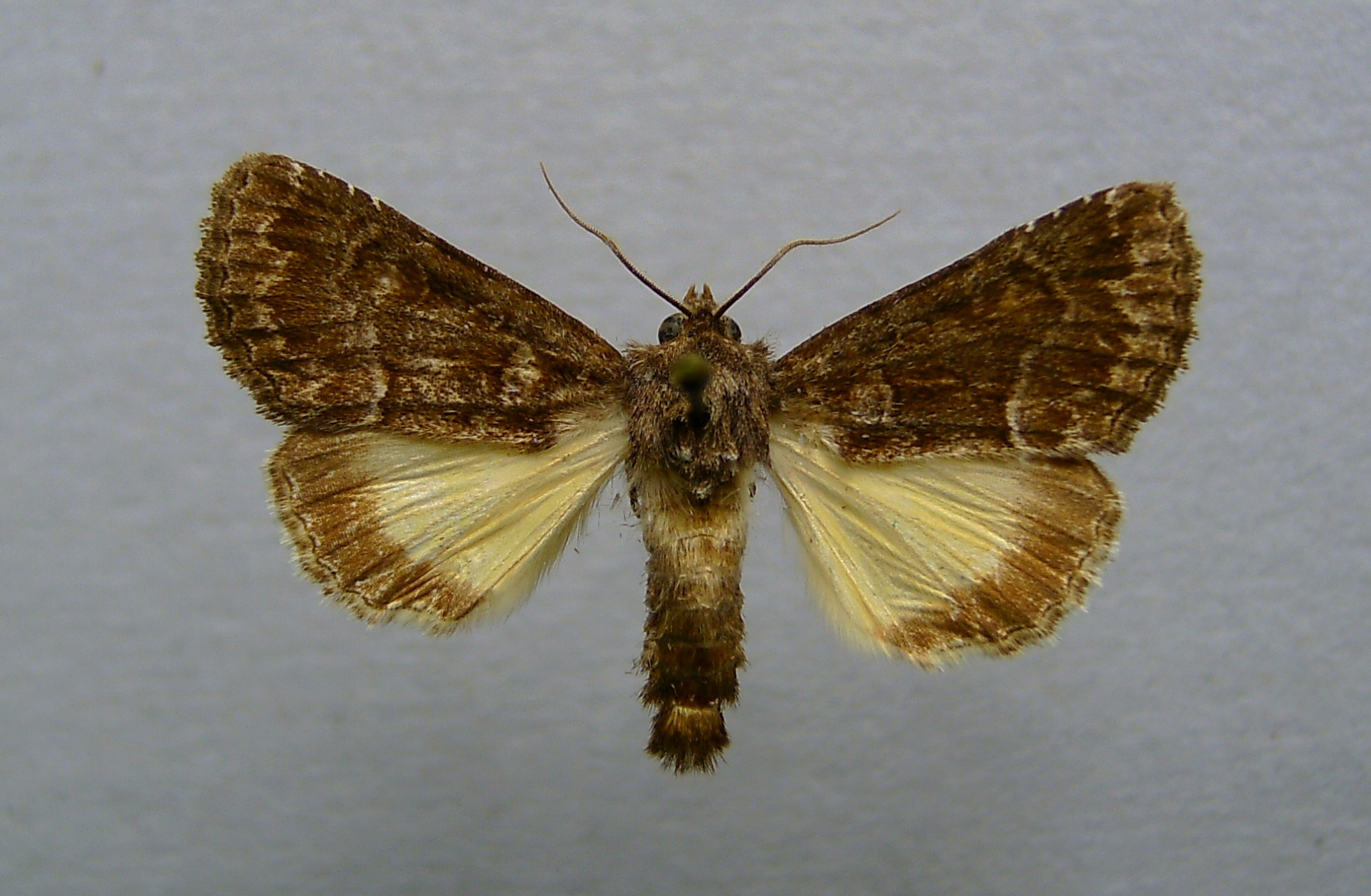
Straw underwing
Thalpophila matura
Hadeninae

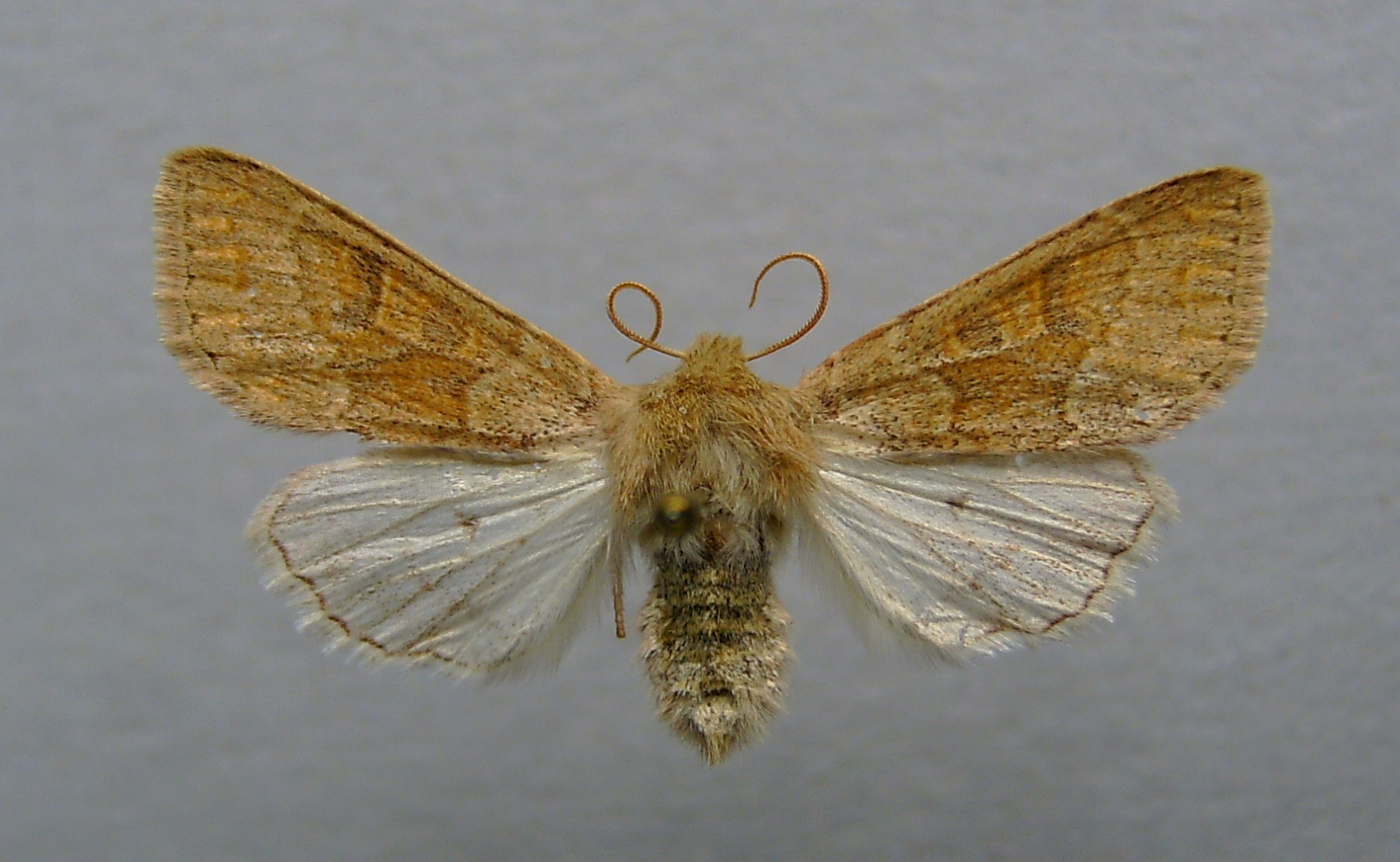
Blossom underwing
Orthosia miniosa
Hadeninae

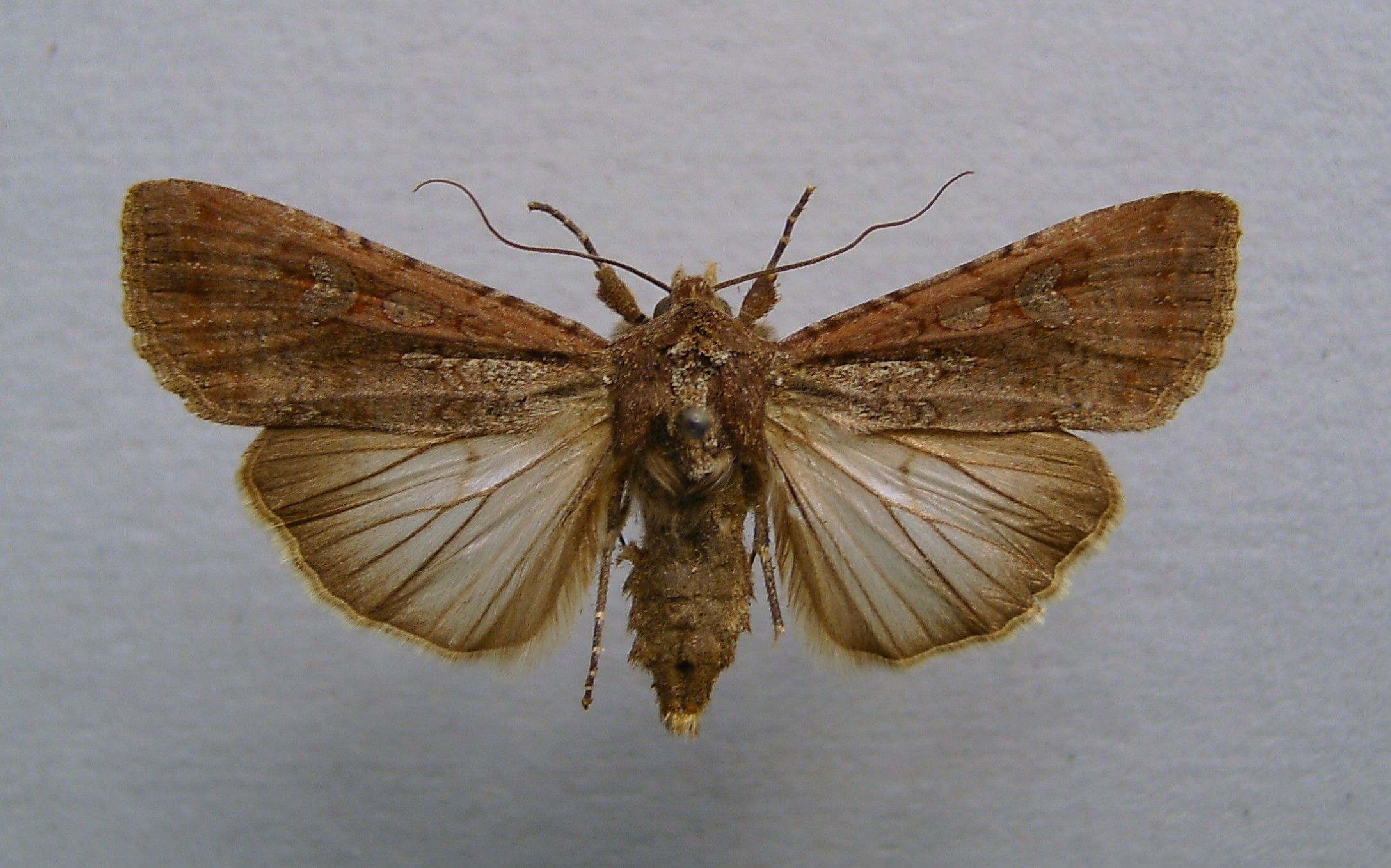
Pearly underwing
Peridroma saucia
Noctuinae

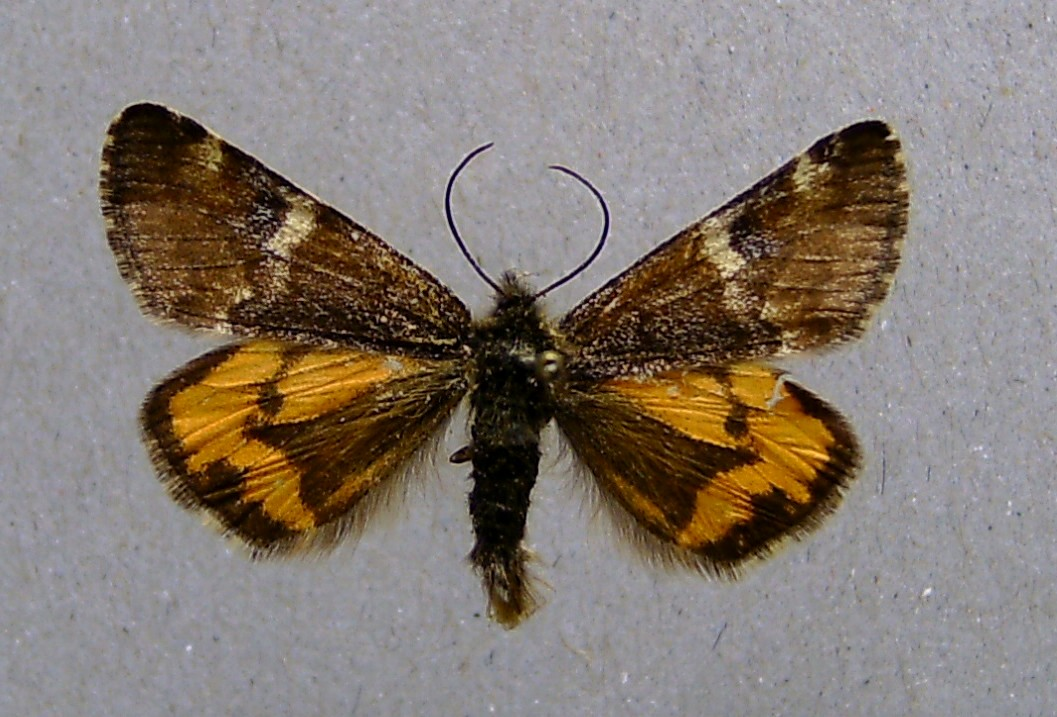
Orange underwing
Archiearis parthenias
Geometridae: Archiearinae

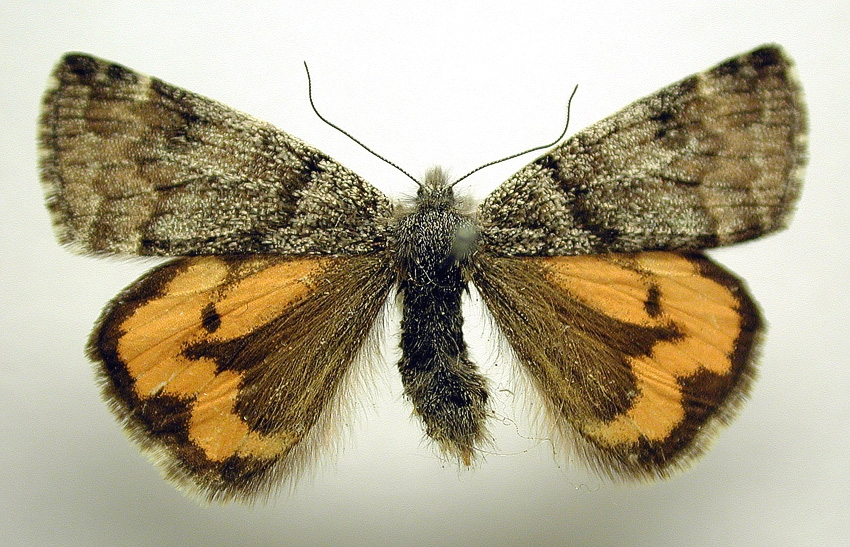
Light orange underwing
Archiearis notha
Geometridae: Archiearinae

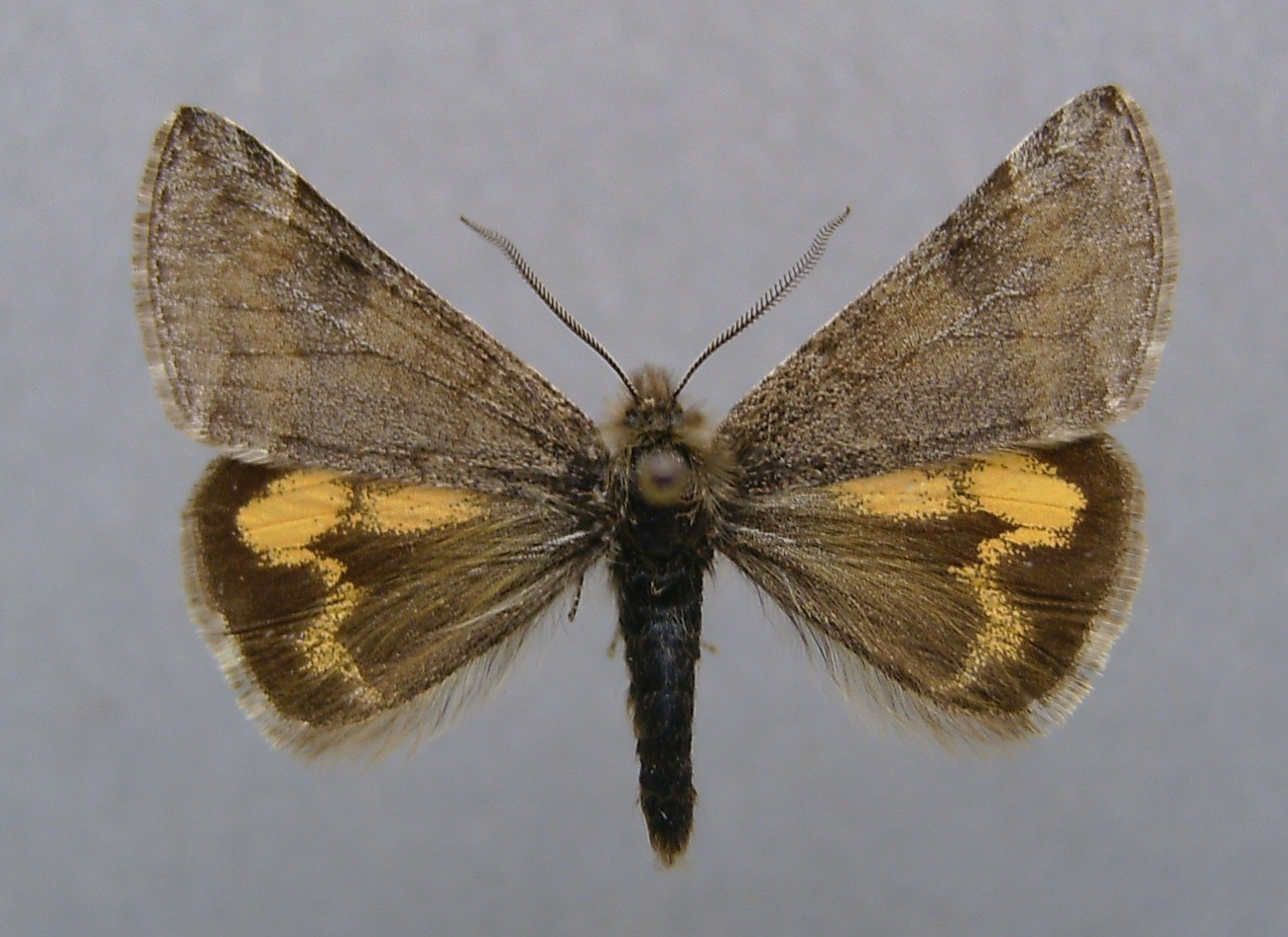
Pale orange underwing
Boudinotiana puella
Geometridae: Archiearinae
