= Schausiania =

Scientific classification
- Kingdom: Animalia
- Phylum: Arthropoda
- Class: Insecta
- Order: Lepidoptera
- Family: Cossidae
- Genus: Schausiania; Strand, 1910

Synonyms
- Hemipecten Dyar, 1905; Hemipectrona Schaus, 1921

Moth genus in family Cossidae

Schausiania is a genus of moths in the family Cossidae.

== Species ==
- Schausiania arpiodes Dognin, 1923
- Schausiania ecparilis (Schaus, 1905) (Hemipecten)
- Schausiania furfurens Hering, 1923
- Schausiania ophthalmodes Hering, 1923
- Schausiania philoba Druce, 1898

== Status unclear ==
- Schausiania velutina Schaus

== Former species ==
- Schausiania acutipennis Schaus, 1905
- Schausiania albimacula Dognin, 1923
- Schausiania alfarae Schaus, 1911
- Schausiania charmion Schaus, 1934
- Schausiania cossuloides Schaus, 1905
- Schausiania gaudeator Schaus, 1911
- Schausiania julius Schaus, 1921
- Schausiania marmorata Schaus, 1905
- Schausiania niveogrisea Schaus, 1905
- Schausiania orima Druce, 1906
- Schausiania rotundipuncta Schaus, 1905
- Schausiania salara Druce, 1900
- Schausiania vinnea Schaus, 1921
