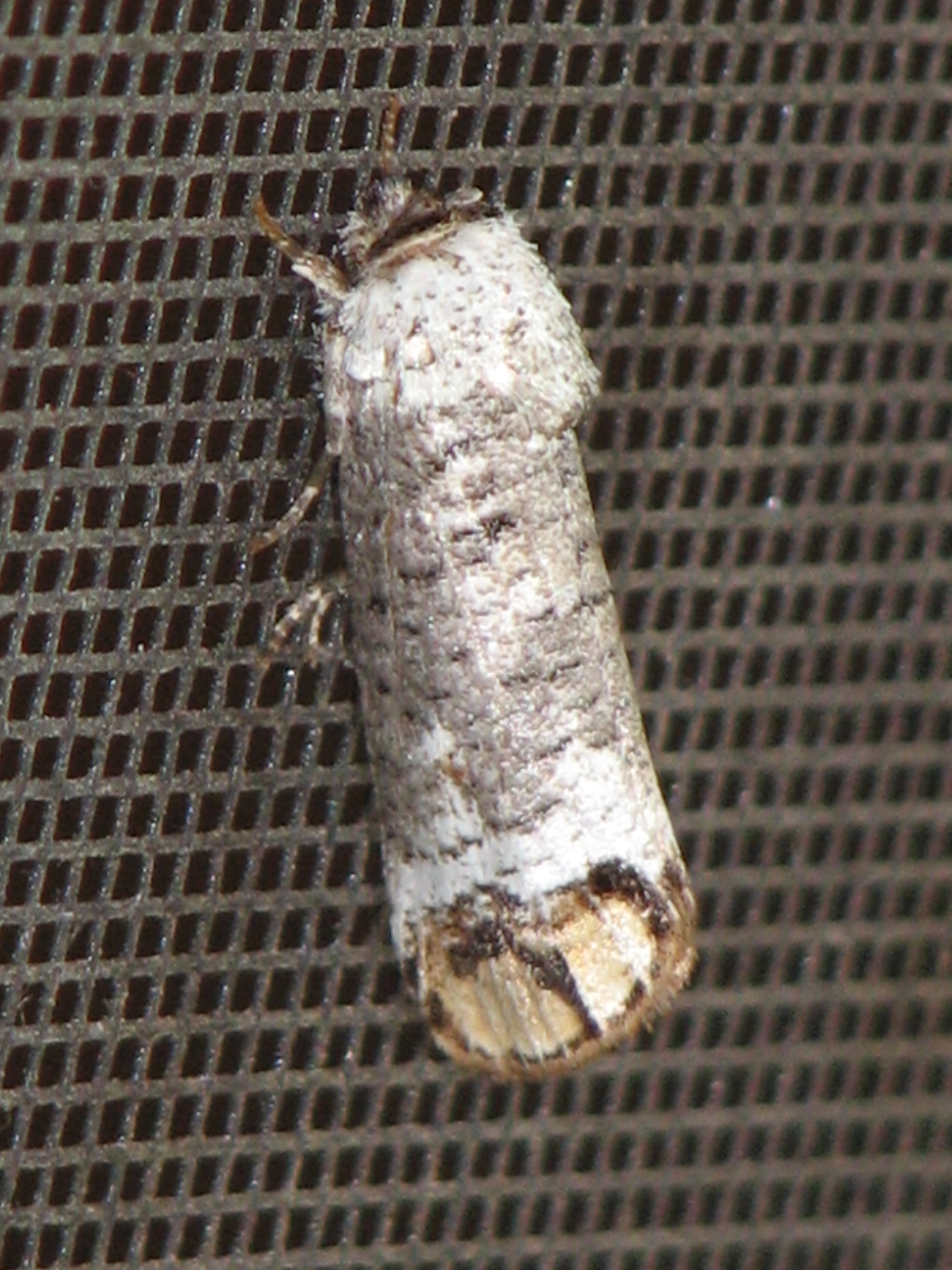
- Cossula magnifica

Scientific classification
- Domain: Eukaryota
- Kingdom: Animalia
- Phylum: Arthropoda
- Class: Insecta
- Order: Lepidoptera
- Family: Cossidae
- Subfamily: Cossulinae
- Genus: Cossula; Bailey, 1882

Synonyms
- Costria Schaus, 1892; Allostylus Hering, 1923; Dimorphoctena Clench, 1957

= Cossula =

Genus of moths

Cossula is a genus of moths in the family Cossidae.

== Species ==
- Cossula albicosta Schaus, 1911
- Cossula alboperlata Bryk, 1953
- Cossula ardosiata Dognin, 1916
- Cossula arpi Schaus, 1901
- Cossula buspina Davis, Gentili-Poole & Mitter, 2008
- Cossula coerulescens Schaus, 1911
- Cossula cossuloides (Schaus, 1911)
- Cossula duplex Dyar, 1937
- Cossula duplexata Davis, Gentili-Poole & Mitter, 2008
- Cossula gaudeator (Schaus, 1911)
- Cossula longirostrum Davis, Gentili-Poole & Mitter, 2008
- Cossula magna Schaus, 1905
- Cossula magnifica Strecker, 1876
- Cossula minutiloba Davis, Gentili-Poole & Mitter, 2008
- Cossula oletta Dyar, 1937
- Cossula omaia Schaus
- Cossula poecilosema Clench, 1961
- Cossula stoica Dognin, 1922
- Cossula tapajoza Dyar, 1937
- Cossula wellingi Clench, 1961

== Former species ==
- Cossula bistellata Dognin, 1910
- Cossula eberti Clench, 1961
- Cossula interrogationis Dyar, 1937
- Cossula morgani Clench, 1957
- Cossula nigripuncta Dognin, 1916
- Cossula notodontoides Schaus, 1892
- Cossula praeclara Schaus, 1892
