= Costria =

Scientific classification
- Kingdom: Animalia
- Phylum: Arthropoda
- Class: Insecta
- Order: Lepidoptera
- Family: Cossidae
- Subfamily: Cossulinae
- Genus: Costria; Schaus, 1892

Synonyms
- Allostylus Hering, 1923; Dimorphoctena Clench, 1957

Genus of moths

Costria is a genus of moths in the family Cossidae. Species are found in South America (Brazil, Colombia, French Guiana).

== Species ==
- Costria abnoba Schaus, 1892
- Costria elegans Schaus, 1901
- Costria okendeni (Druce, 1906)

Names brought to synonymy

- Costria arpi (Schaus, 1901), a synonym for Cossula arpi
- Costria corita (Schaus, 1901), a synonym for Simplicivalva corita
- Costria discopuncta (Schaus, 1901), a synonym for Spinulata discopuncta
- Costria maruga (Schaus, 1901), a synonym for Spinulata maruga
- Costria striolata (Schaus, 1901), a synonym for Simplicivalva striolata
