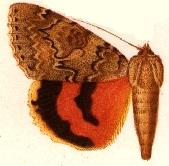

Scientific classification
- Kingdom: Animalia
- Phylum: Arthropoda
- Class: Insecta
- Order: Lepidoptera
- Superfamily: Noctuoidea
- Family: Erebidae
- Genus: Catocala
- Species: C. luciana

Binomial name
- Catocala luciana Strecker, 1874

Synonyms
- Catocala nebraskae Dodge, 1875

= Catocala luciana =

Species of moth

Catocala luciana, the shining underwing, is a moth of the family Erebidae. The species was first described by Herman Strecker in 1874. It is found in western North America, as far east as Minnesota and Illinois and northward into extreme southern Alberta and Saskatchewan. It occurs widely across the Great Plains, south to New Mexico, Arizona and California.

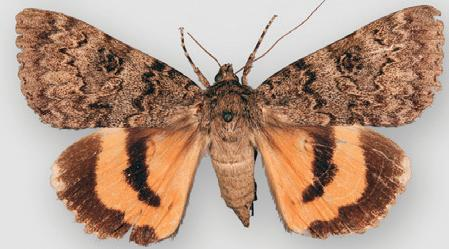
Lectotype of Catocala nebraskae, now considered to be a synonym of Catocala luciana

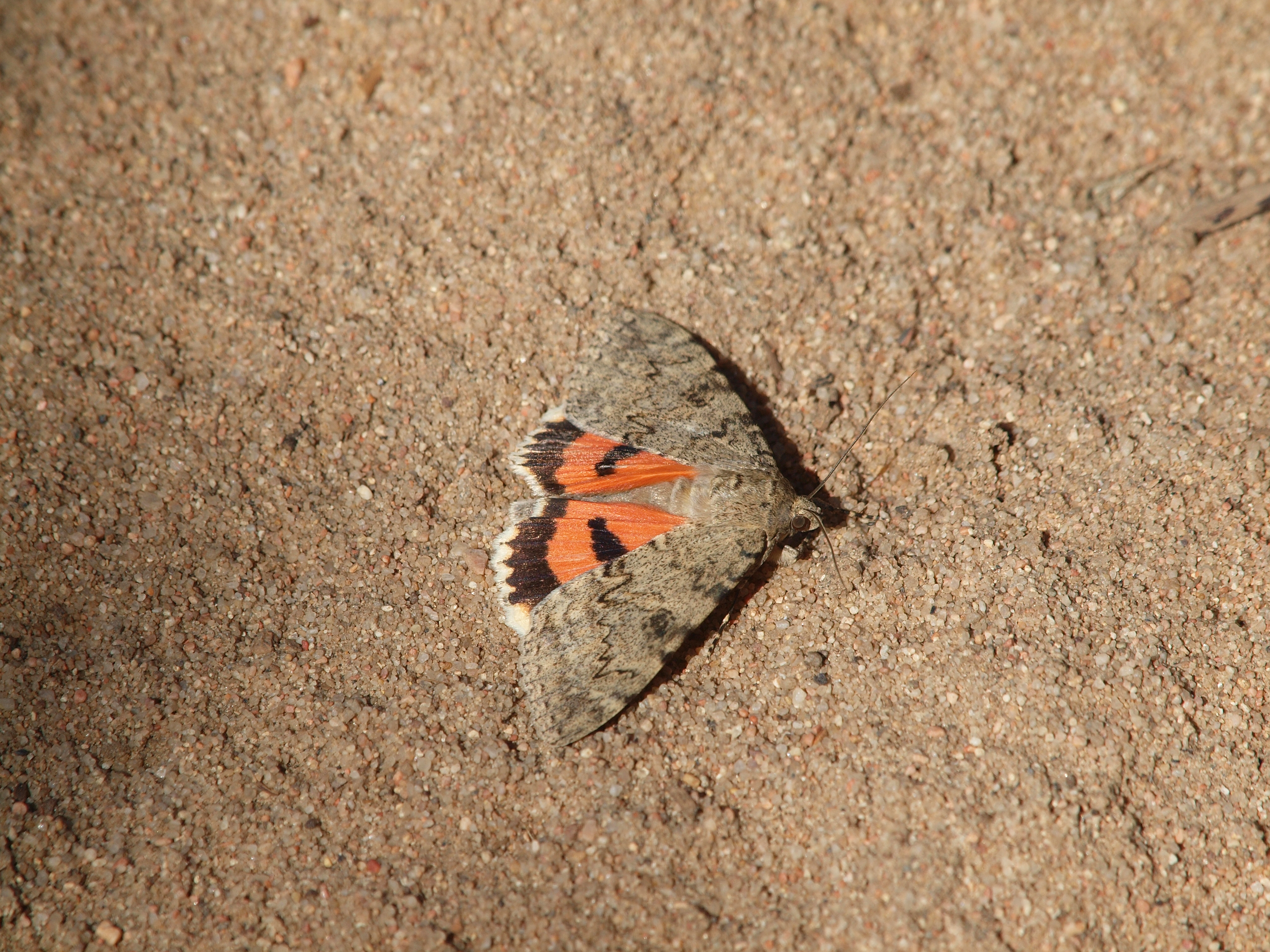

The wingspan is 63–68 mm. Adults are on wing from August to October depending on the location.
