= Spinulata quasivinnea =

Scientific classification
- Kingdom: Animalia
- Phylum: Arthropoda
- Class: Insecta
- Order: Lepidoptera
- Family: Cossidae
- Subfamily: Cossulinae
- Genus: Spinulata
- Species: S. quasivinnea

Binomial name
- Spinulata quasivinnea Davis, Gentili-Poole & Mitter, 2008

Species of moth

Spinulata quasivinnea is a moth in the family Cossidae. It is found in Costa Rica.
