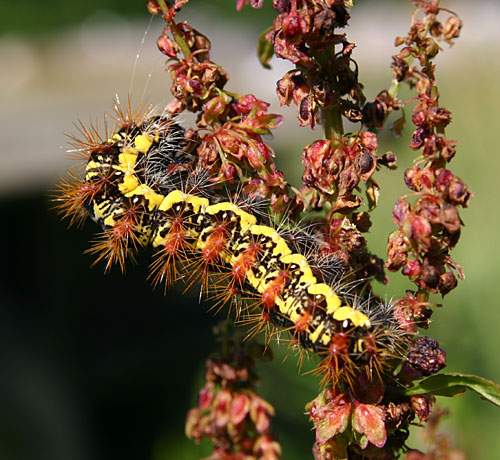

Scientific classification
- Kingdom: Animalia
- Phylum: Arthropoda
- Clade: Pancrustacea
- Class: Insecta
- Order: Lepidoptera
- Superfamily: Noctuoidea
- Family: Noctuidae
- Genus: Acronicta
- Species: A. oblinita

Binomial name
- Acronicta oblinita (J. E. Smith, 1797)

Synonyms
- Acronicta arioch (Strecker, 1898)

= Acronicta oblinita =

Species of moth

Acronicta oblinita, the smeared dagger moth or arioch dagger, is a moth of the family Noctuidae. Its larva, the smartweed caterpillar, has urticating hairs. The species was first described by James Edward Smith in 1797.

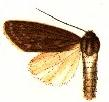

== Description ==
The smeared dagger moth adult has a wingspan of 3.6–5.4 centimetres (1.4–2.1 in). The forewings have a mottled gray appearance, with orbicular and reniform spots on each dorsal surface that are incompletely outlined and indistinct. Smeared-appearing dark wedge spots are present along the postmedial line with their apices pointed inward. There is a terminal line of dark spots on the forewing. The hindwings are white and also have small dark spots along their terminal line.

The larva is a caterpillar up to 4 centimetres (1.6 in) long that bears numerous tufts of irritating setae on wart-like protuberances along its thoracic and abdominal segments. There are bright yellow blotches in the shape of carets (inverted "V" shapes) between the laterally-positioned spiracles.

== Range ==
The smeared dagger moth is found across Canada as far north as Lake Athabasca. In the United States, the moth is found in the Pacific Northwest and east of the Rocky Mountains south to Florida and Texas.

== Habitat ==
Habitats include bogs and coastal marshes in the Pacific Northwest and wetlands, forests and meadows more generally. Individuals have been collected in boreal forests in Canada.

== Life cycle ==
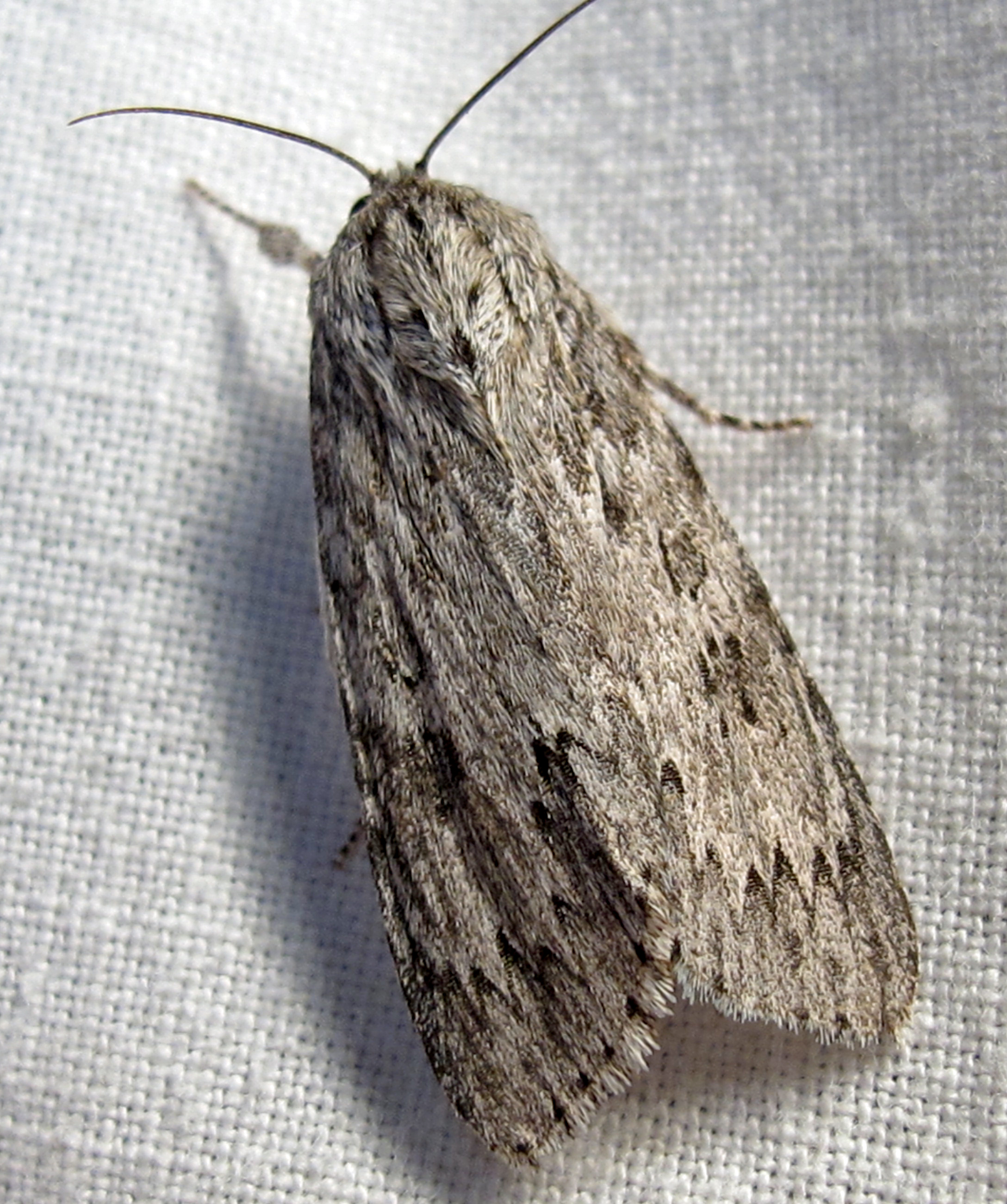
Adult moth

The smeared dagger moth has one to two generations per year. In the coastal plain of North Carolina, adults can be seen beginning in early March through late June and again from mid-August until early October. Caterpillars may pupate within folded leaves of their host plant. Overwintering occurs as pupae.

== Host plants ==
Larval hosts:

- Salix spp.
- Alnus spp.
- Fragaria spp.
- Typha spp.
- Chamaenerion angustifolium
- Polygonum spp.
