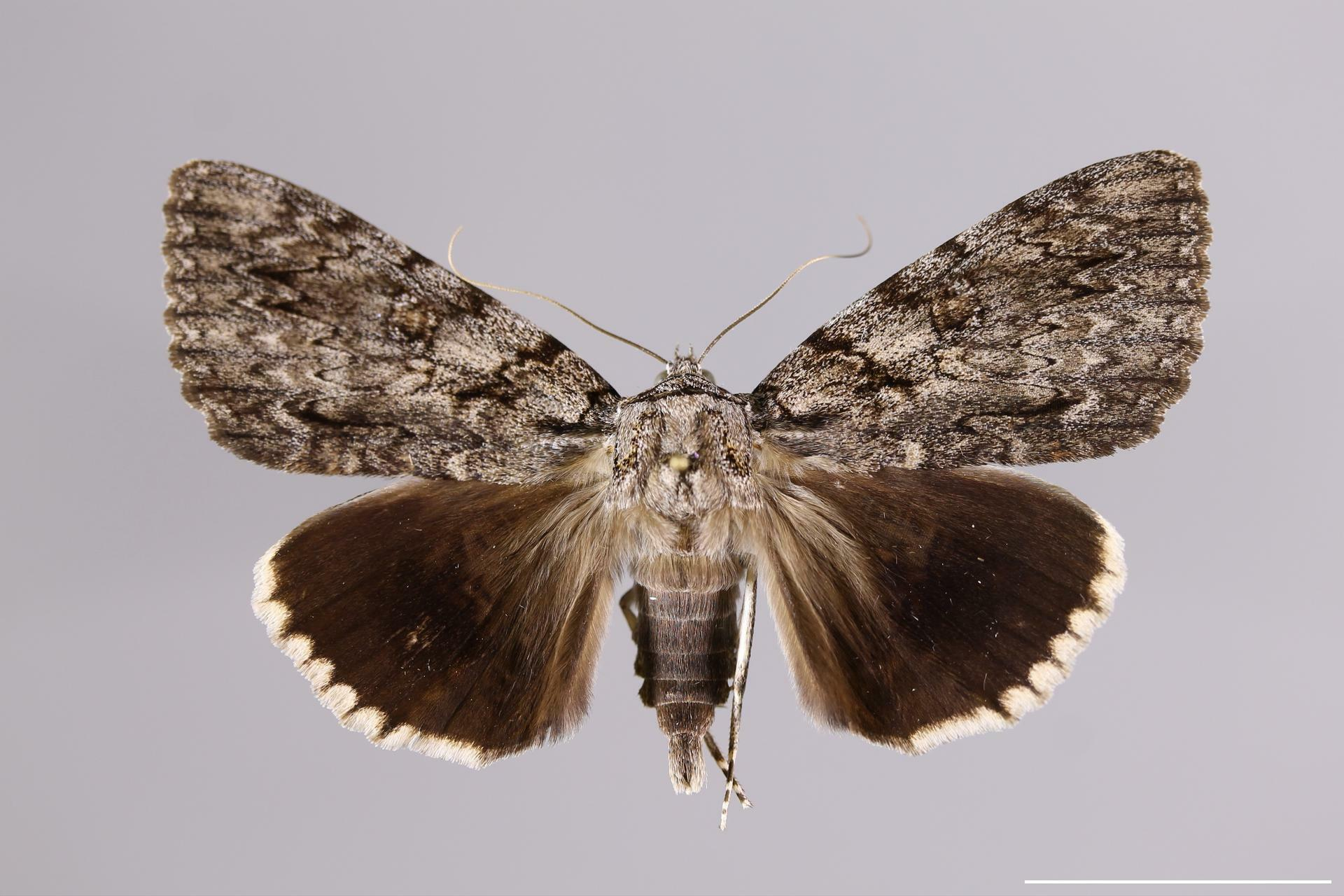

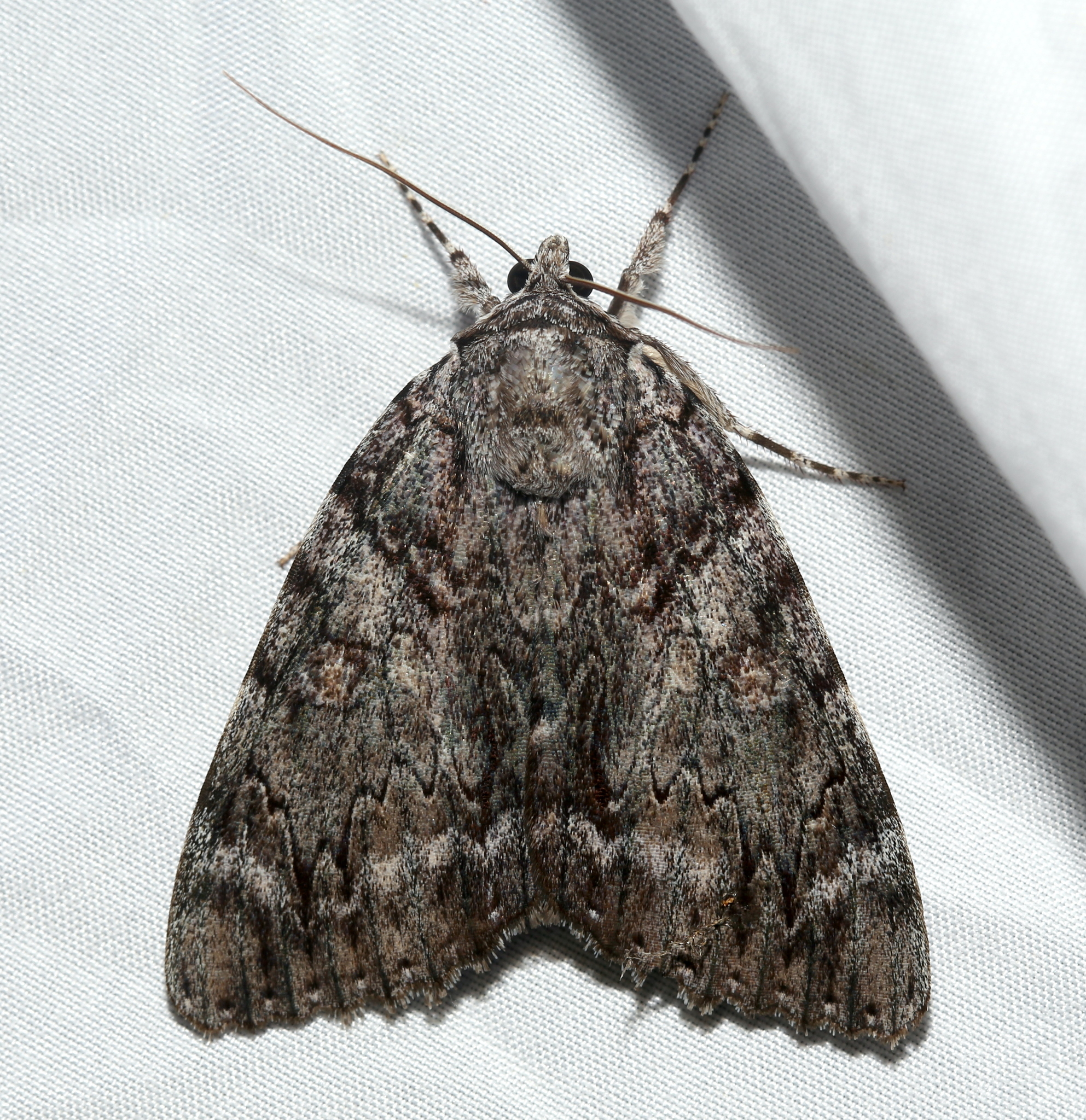

Scientific classification
- Kingdom: Animalia
- Phylum: Arthropoda
- Class: Insecta
- Order: Lepidoptera
- Superfamily: Noctuoidea
- Family: Erebidae
- Genus: Catocala
- Species: C. ulalume

Binomial name
- Catocala ulalume Strecker, 1878

Synonyms
- Catocala lacrymosa ulalume

= Catocala ulalume =

Species of moth

Catocala ulalume, the Ulalume underwing, is a moth of the family Erebidae. The species was first described by Herman Strecker in 1878. It is found in the United States from Virginia through Georgia to Florida, west to Texas and Oklahoma and north to Illinois.

The wingspan is 60–75 mm. Adults are on wing from June to September. There is one generation per year.

The larvae feed on Carya alba.
