= Catocala cleopatra =

Scientific classification
- Kingdom: Animalia
- Phylum: Arthropoda
- Class: Insecta
- Order: Lepidoptera
- Superfamily: Noctuoidea
- Family: Erebidae
- Genus: Catocala
- Species: C. cleopatra

Binomial name
- Catocala cleopatra Strecker, 1874

Synonyms
- Catocala perdita Strecker, 1874; Catocala barbara Cassino, 1918; Catocala perdita Strecker, 1874; Catocala perdita H. Edwards, 1875 (preocc.); Catocala californica cleopatra

Species of moth

Catocala cleopatra or Catocala faustina cleopatra is a moth of the family Erebidae. It is found from British Columbia south to California.

The wingspan is about 65 mm. Adults are on wing from June to September. There is probably one generation per year.

The larvae feed on Gleditsia triacanthos, Malus species, including Malus pumila, Prunus species, including Prunus americana and Prunus ilicifolia and Ulmus species.
