= Euxoa dargo =

Scientific classification
- Domain: Eukaryota
- Kingdom: Animalia
- Phylum: Arthropoda
- Class: Insecta
- Order: Lepidoptera
- Superfamily: Noctuoidea
- Family: Noctuidae
- Genus: Euxoa
- Species: E. dargo

Binomial name
- Euxoa dargo (Strecker, 1898)

Synonyms
- Agrotis dargo Strecker, 1898; Carneades rumatana Smith, 1903

Species of moth

Euxoa dargo is a moth of the family Noctuidae first described by Ferdinand Heinrich Hermann Strecker in 1898. It is found in North America from south-eastern Manitoba west to the southern interior of British Columbia, south to Oregon, southern Idaho and northern New Mexico, and east to eastern South Dakota.

The wingspan is 27–29 mm. Adults are on wing from August to September. There is one generation per year.

Larvae have been recorded on corn and Salsola species.
