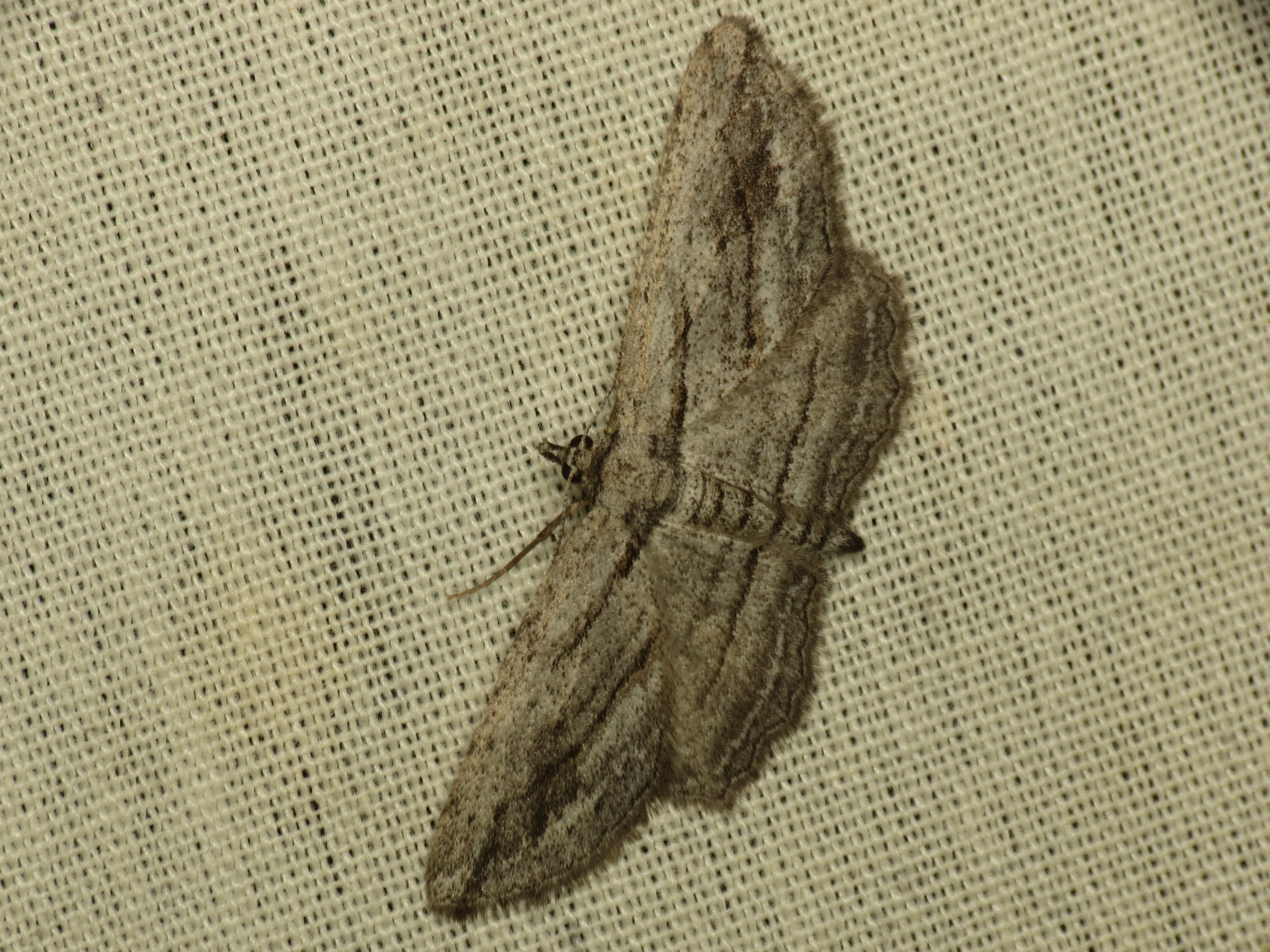
- Pterotaea sp., close to Pterotaea lamiaria (Strecker, 1899), to black light, Mangini Ranch, Concord, CA, June 2013

Scientific classification
- Domain: Eukaryota
- Kingdom: Animalia
- Phylum: Arthropoda
- Class: Insecta
- Order: Lepidoptera
- Family: Geometridae
- Genus: Pterotaea
- Species: P. lamiaria

Binomial name
- Pterotaea lamiaria (Strecker, 1899)

= Pterotaea lamiaria =

Species of moth

Pterotaea lamiaria is a species of geometrid moth in the family Geometridae. It is found in North America.

The MONA or Hodges number for Pterotaea lamiaria is 6553.

== Subspecies ==
These two subspecies belong to the species Pterotaea lamiaria:

- Pterotaea lamiaria lamiaria
- Pterotaea lamiaria tytthos Rindge, 1970
