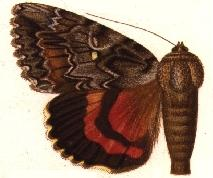

Scientific classification
- Kingdom: Animalia
- Phylum: Arthropoda
- Clade: Pancrustacea
- Class: Insecta
- Order: Lepidoptera
- Superfamily: Noctuoidea
- Family: Erebidae
- Genus: Catocala
- Species: C. aholibah

Binomial name
- Catocala aholibah Strecker, 1874

Synonyms
- Catocala coloradensis Beutenmueller, 1903; Catocala ellenensis Reiff, 1920

= Aholibah underwing =

Species of moth

The Aholibah underwing (Catocala aholibah) is a moth of the "owlet" family Erebidae, which has over 25,000 known members, and more than that yet undescribed. Like other moths of the underwing genus (Catocala), this species has dull gray and black speckled forewings which help it blend into its surroundings, and bright orange underwings that it reveals to startle predators.

The adults are mature during the early summer, and are found in western North America from British Columbia south to Arizona.

An adult has a wingspan of up to 8 centimeters. The larva is a dark gray mottled caterpillar with thick pink-tinted legs and a jumping ability. The adults feed on nectar, sap, and rotting fruit, while the larvae prefer the foliage of several oak species.
