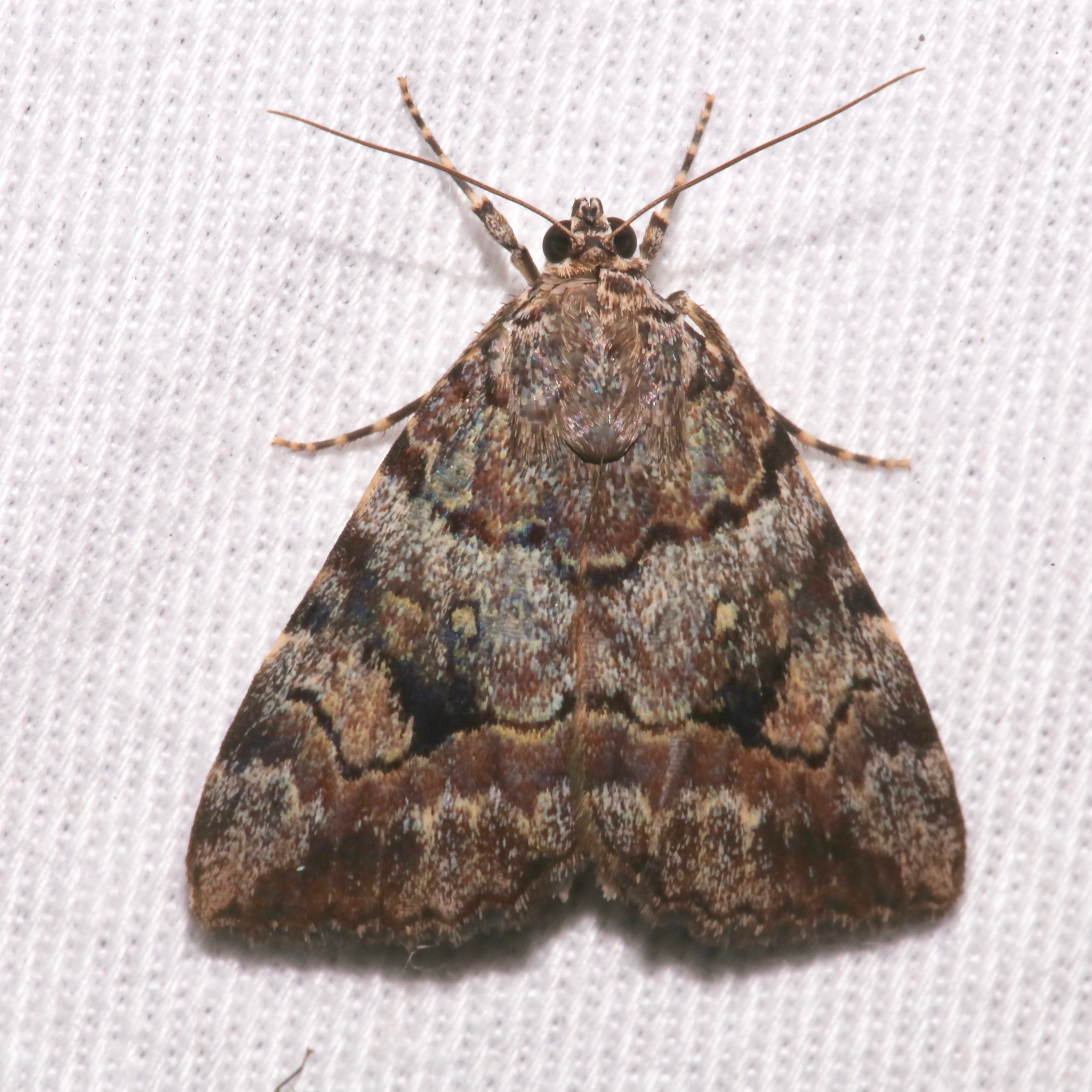

Scientific classification
- Kingdom: Animalia
- Phylum: Arthropoda
- Class: Insecta
- Order: Lepidoptera
- Superfamily: Noctuoidea
- Family: Erebidae
- Genus: Catocala
- Species: C. jair

Binomial name
- Catocala jair Strecker, 1897

= Catocala jair =

Species of moth

Catocala jair, the Jair underwing or Barrens underwing, is a moth of the family Erebidae. The species was first described by Strecker in 1897. It is found from the Pine Barrens of New Jersey, in the coastal plain in Bladen County, North Carolina and in the northern half of Florida.

The wingspan is 35–40 mm. Adults are on wing from May to June. There is probably one generation per year.

The larvae feed on Quercus.
