= Spinulata rille =

Scientific classification
- Kingdom: Animalia
- Phylum: Arthropoda
- Class: Insecta
- Order: Lepidoptera
- Family: Cossidae
- Subfamily: Cossulinae
- Genus: Spinulata
- Species: S. rille

Binomial name
- Spinulata rille (Dyar & Schaus, 1937)

Synonyms
- Cossula rille Dyar & Schaus, 1937

Species of moth

Spinulata rille is a moth in the family Cossidae. It is found in Brazil.
