= Trichordestra tacoma =

Scientific classification
- Domain: Eukaryota
- Kingdom: Animalia
- Phylum: Arthropoda
- Class: Insecta
- Order: Lepidoptera
- Superfamily: Noctuoidea
- Family: Noctuidae
- Genus: Trichordestra
- Species: T. tacoma

Binomial name
- Trichordestra tacoma (Strecker, 1900)

Species of moth

Trichordestra tacoma, the Tacoma polia, is a species of cutworm or dart moth in the family Noctuidae. It is found in North America.

The MONA or Hodges number for Trichordestra tacoma is 10303.
