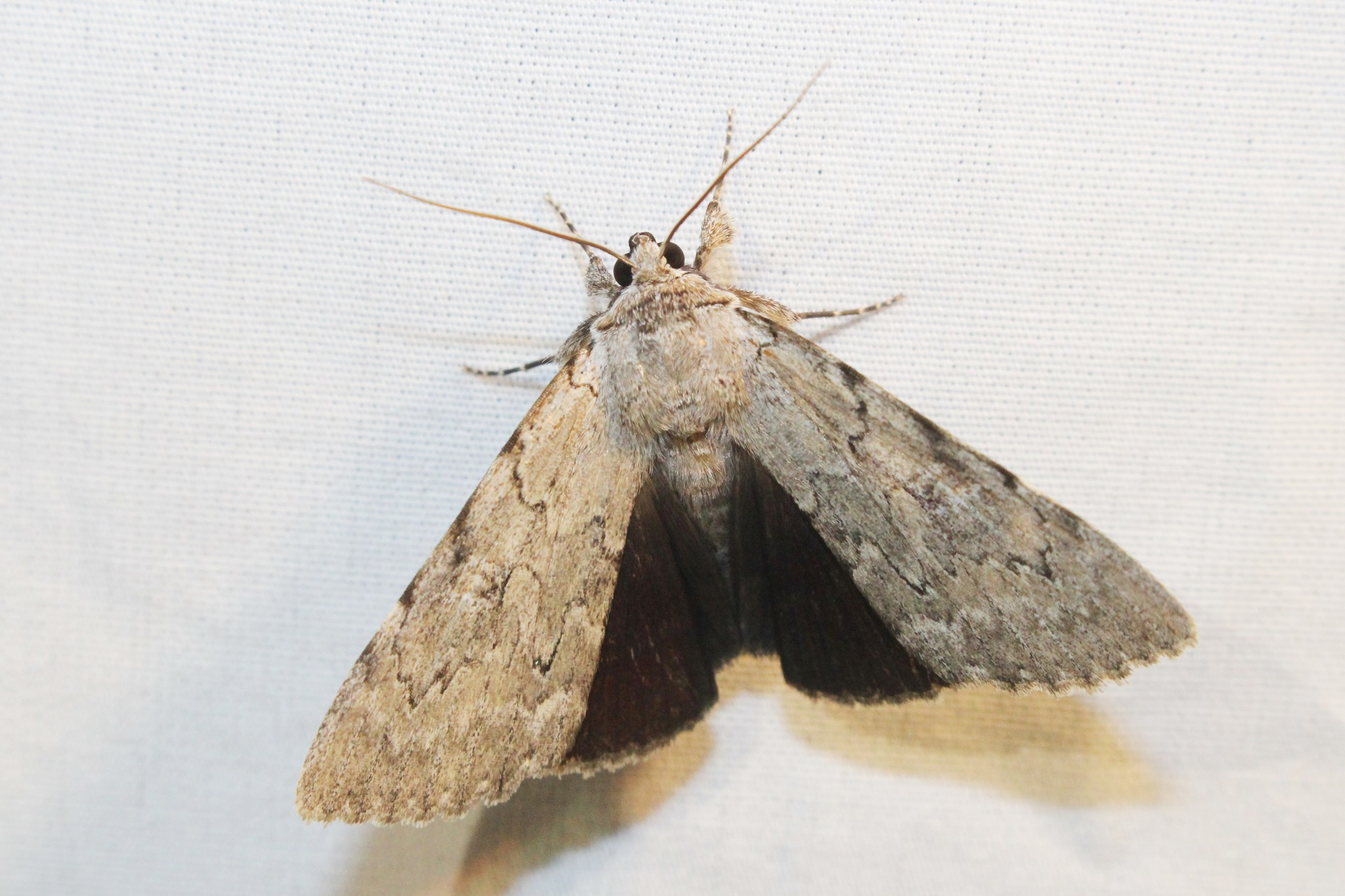

Scientific classification
- Kingdom: Animalia
- Phylum: Arthropoda
- Class: Insecta
- Order: Lepidoptera
- Superfamily: Noctuoidea
- Family: Erebidae
- Genus: Catocala
- Species: C. judith

Binomial name
- Catocala judith Strecker, 1874

Synonyms
- Catabapta judith; Catocala levettei Grote, 1874

= Catocala judith =

Judith's underwing

Species of moth

Catocala judith, or Judith's underwing, is a moth of the family Erebidae. The species was first described by Strecker in 1874. It is found in North America from southern Quebec (where it is rare) and Ontario to the United States from New Hampshire south through Connecticut and New Jersey to North Carolina and Georgia, west to Oklahoma and Iowa and north to Wisconsin.

The wingspan is 45–55 mm. Adults are on wing from July to October depending on the location.

The larvae feed on Carya illinoinensis, Carya ovata and Juglans nigra.
