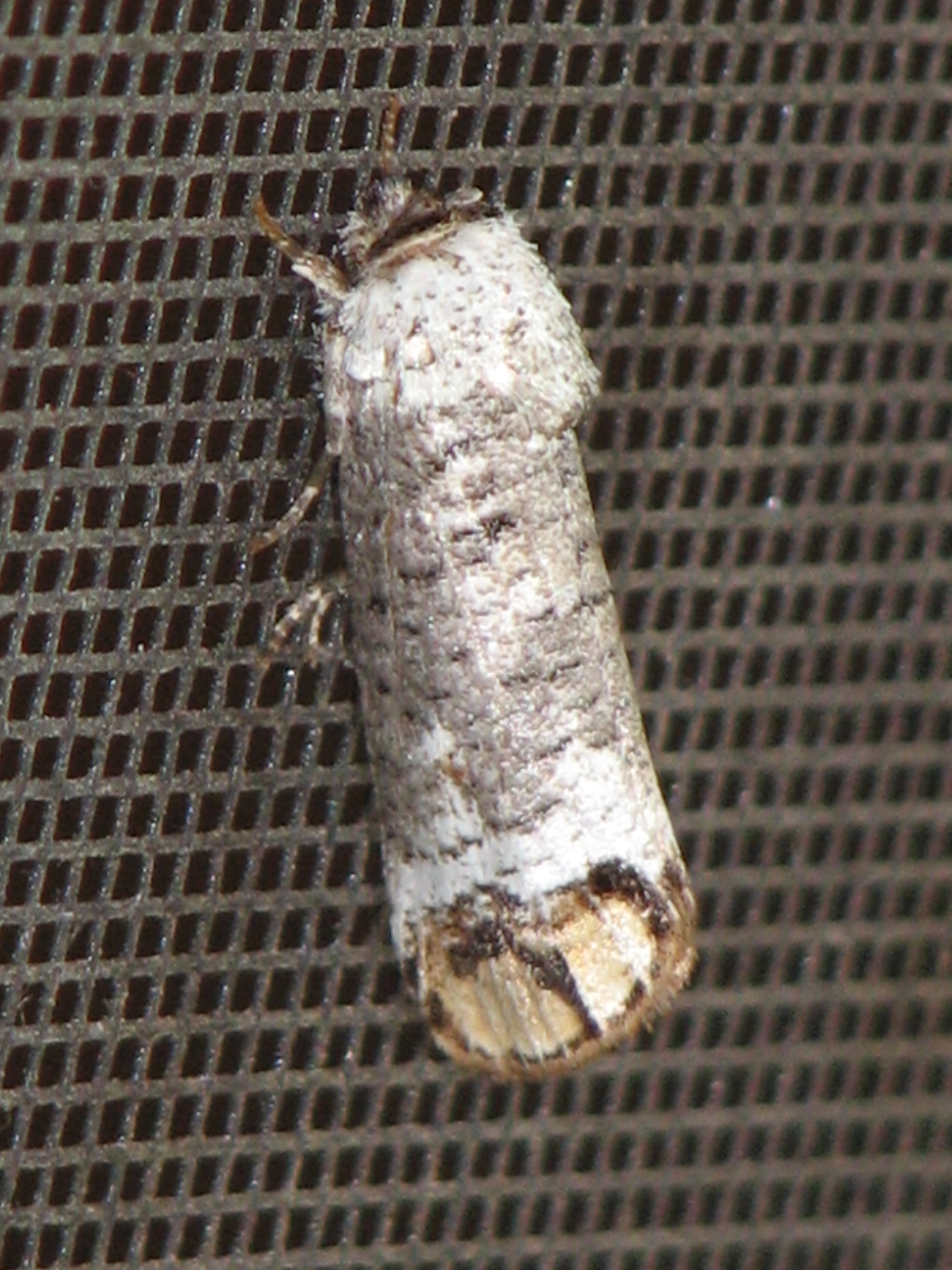

Scientific classification
- Domain: Eukaryota
- Kingdom: Animalia
- Phylum: Arthropoda
- Class: Insecta
- Order: Lepidoptera
- Family: Cossidae
- Genus: Cossula
- Species: C. magnifica

Binomial name
- Cossula magnifica Strecker, 1876

Synonyms
- Cossula basalis Edwards, 1891; Cossula norax Druce, 1891

= Cossula magnifica =

Pecan carpenterworm moth

Species of moth

Cossula magnifica, the pecan carpenterworm moth, is a moth of the family Cossidae found in the southeastern parts of United States, from North Carolina south to Florida, and west to Mississippi and Texas.

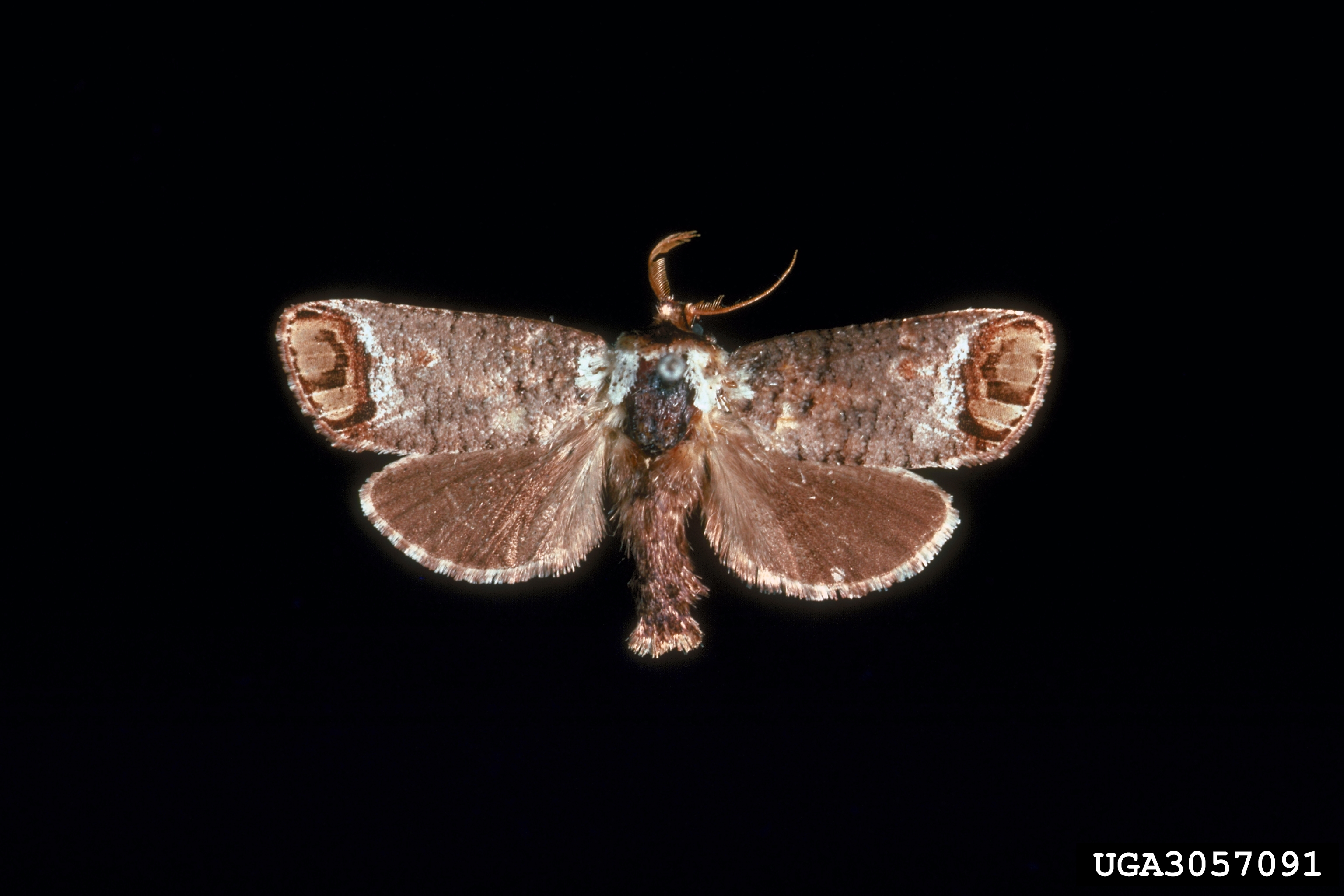
Mounted specimen

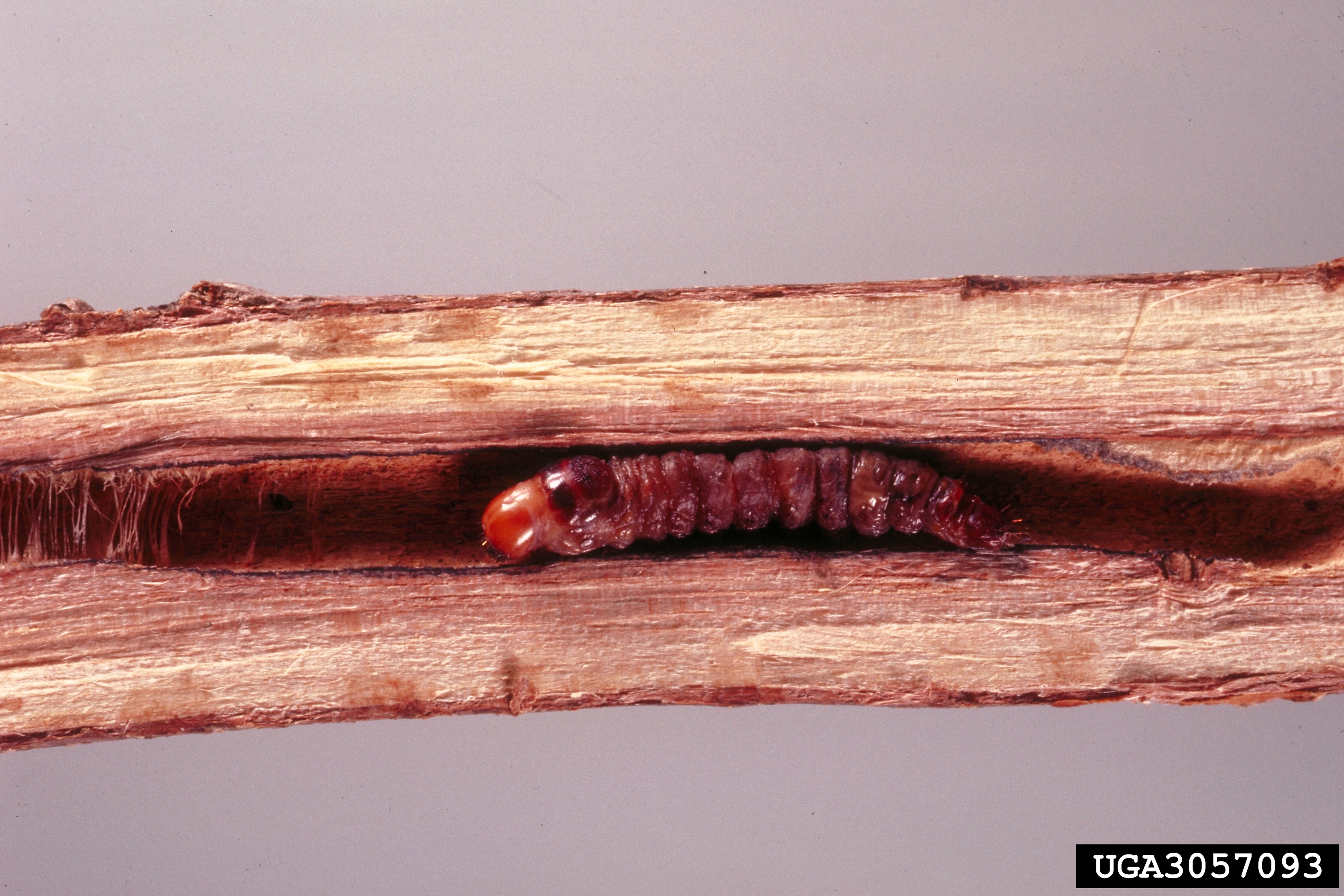
Caterpillar

The wingspan is 32–45 mm. Adults are on wing from March to June depending on the location.

The larvae feed on Carya species, including Carya illinoinensis, but also on Diospyros and Quercus species.
