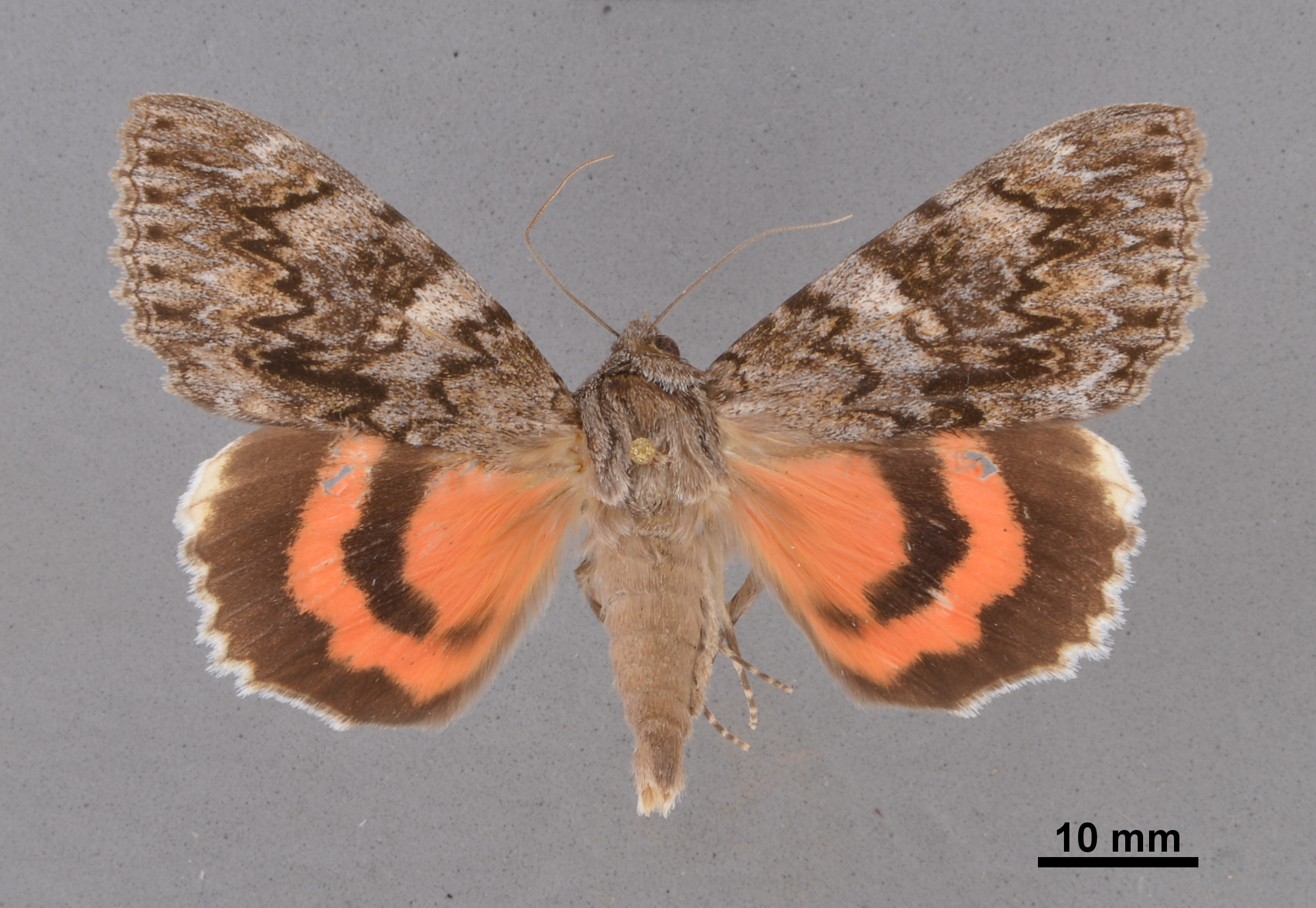

Scientific classification
- Kingdom: Animalia
- Phylum: Arthropoda
- Class: Insecta
- Order: Lepidoptera
- Superfamily: Noctuoidea
- Family: Erebidae
- Genus: Catocala
- Species: C. faustina

Binomial name
- Catocala faustina Strecker, 1873

Synonyms
- Catocala rubra Cassino, 1918; Catocala faustina var. zillah Strecker, 1878; Catocala faustina var. carlota Beutenmüller, 1897; Catocala faustina var. lydia Beutenmüller, 1907

= Catocala faustina =

Species of moth

Catocala faustina is a species of moth in the family Erebidae. It is found in the United States from Colorado west to California and north to British Columbia, Canada.

The wingspan is about 58 mm. Adults are on wing from September to October depending on the location. There is probably one generation per year.

The larvae feed on Salix species.

== Subspecies ==
- Catocala faustina faustina Strecker, 1873
- Catocala faustina cleopatra Strecker, 1874
- Catocala faustina allusa Hulst, 1884

The latter two are often considered distinct species, leaving C: faustina monotypic.
