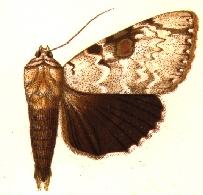

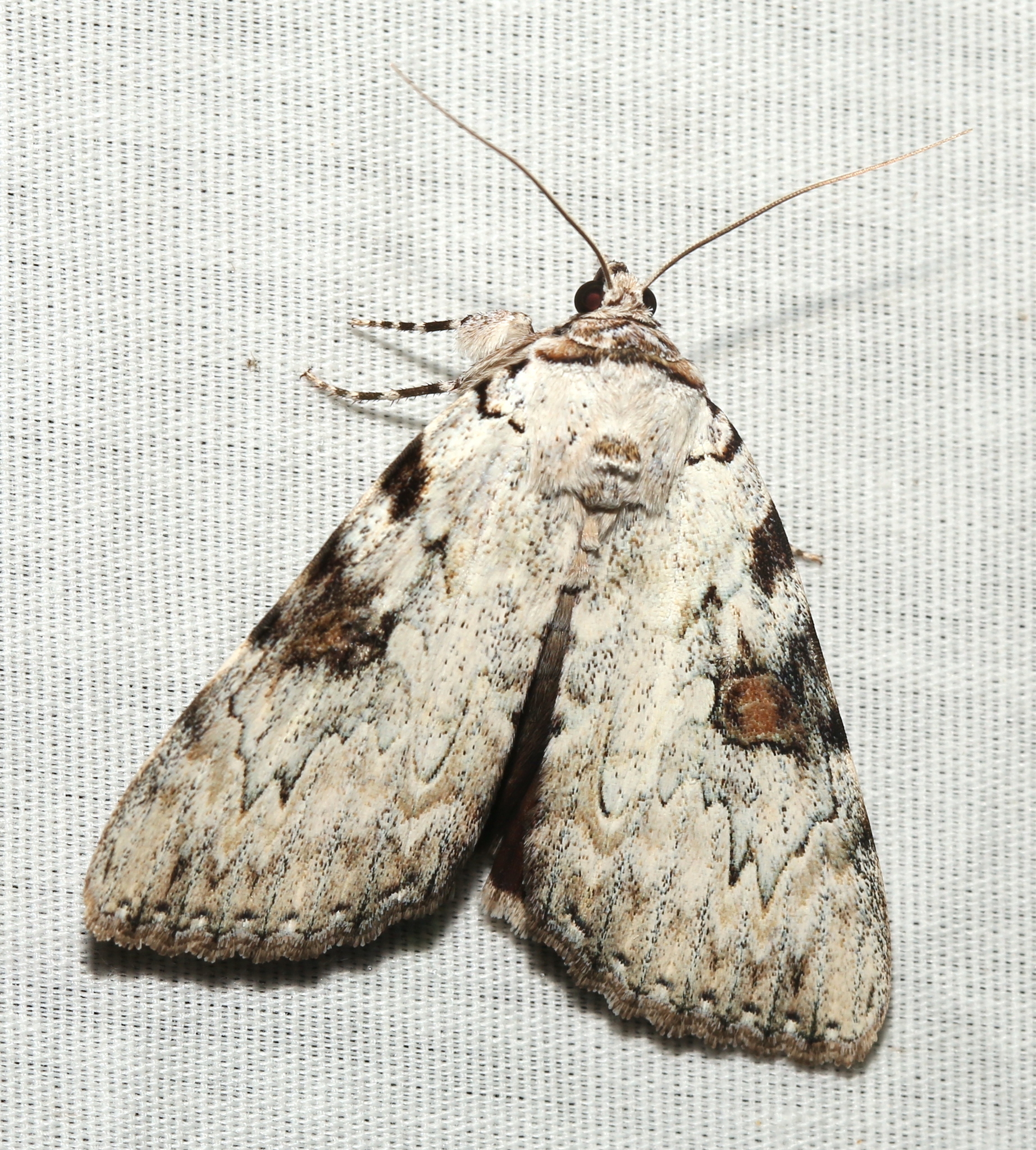

Scientific classification
- Kingdom: Animalia
- Phylum: Arthropoda
- Class: Insecta
- Order: Lepidoptera
- Superfamily: Noctuoidea
- Family: Erebidae
- Genus: Catocala
- Species: C. sappho

Binomial name
- Catocala sappho Strecker, 1874

Synonyms
- Catabapta sappho; Catocala cleis Cassino, 1918

= Catocala sappho =

Sappho underwing

Species of moth

Catocala sappho, the Sappho underwing, is a moth of the family Erebidae. The species was first described by Ferdinand Heinrich Hermann Strecker in 1874. It is found from Virginia and Tennessee south to Florida and west to Louisiana, Mississippi, Texas, Missouri and Illinois.

The wingspan is 62–75 mm. Adults are on wing from May to July and September to October in highland areas.

The larvae feed on Carya species.
