= Spinulata ryssa =

Scientific classification
- Kingdom: Animalia
- Phylum: Arthropoda
- Clade: Pancrustacea
- Class: Insecta
- Order: Lepidoptera
- Family: Cossidae
- Subfamily: Cossulinae
- Genus: Spinulata
- Species: S. ryssa

Binomial name
- Spinulata ryssa (Dyar & Schaus, 1937)

Synonyms
- Cossula ryssa Dyar & Schaus, 1937

Species of moth

Spinulata ryssa is a moth in the family Cossidae. It is found in Bolivia.
