= Cossula duplex =

Scientific classification
- Kingdom: Animalia
- Phylum: Arthropoda
- Class: Insecta
- Order: Lepidoptera
- Family: Cossidae
- Genus: Cossula
- Species: C. duplex

Binomial name
- Cossula duplex Dyar & Schaus, 1937

Species of moth

Cossula duplex is a moth in the family Cossidae. It is found in Panama.
