= Cossula ardosiata =

Scientific classification
- Domain: Eukaryota
- Kingdom: Animalia
- Phylum: Arthropoda
- Class: Insecta
- Order: Lepidoptera
- Family: Cossidae
- Genus: Cossula
- Species: C. ardosiata

Binomial name
- Cossula ardosiata Dognin, 1916

Species of moth

Cossula ardosiata is a moth in the family Cossidae. It is found in South America, including French Guiana.
