= Magulacra nigripennata =

Scientific classification
- Domain: Eukaryota
- Kingdom: Animalia
- Phylum: Arthropoda
- Class: Insecta
- Order: Lepidoptera
- Family: Cossidae
- Genus: Magulacra
- Species: M. nigripennata

Binomial name
- Magulacra nigripennata (Dognin, 1924)

Synonyms
- Hemipectrona nigripennata Dognin, 1924

Species of moth

Magulacra nigripennata is a moth in the family Cossidae. It is found in French Guiana.
