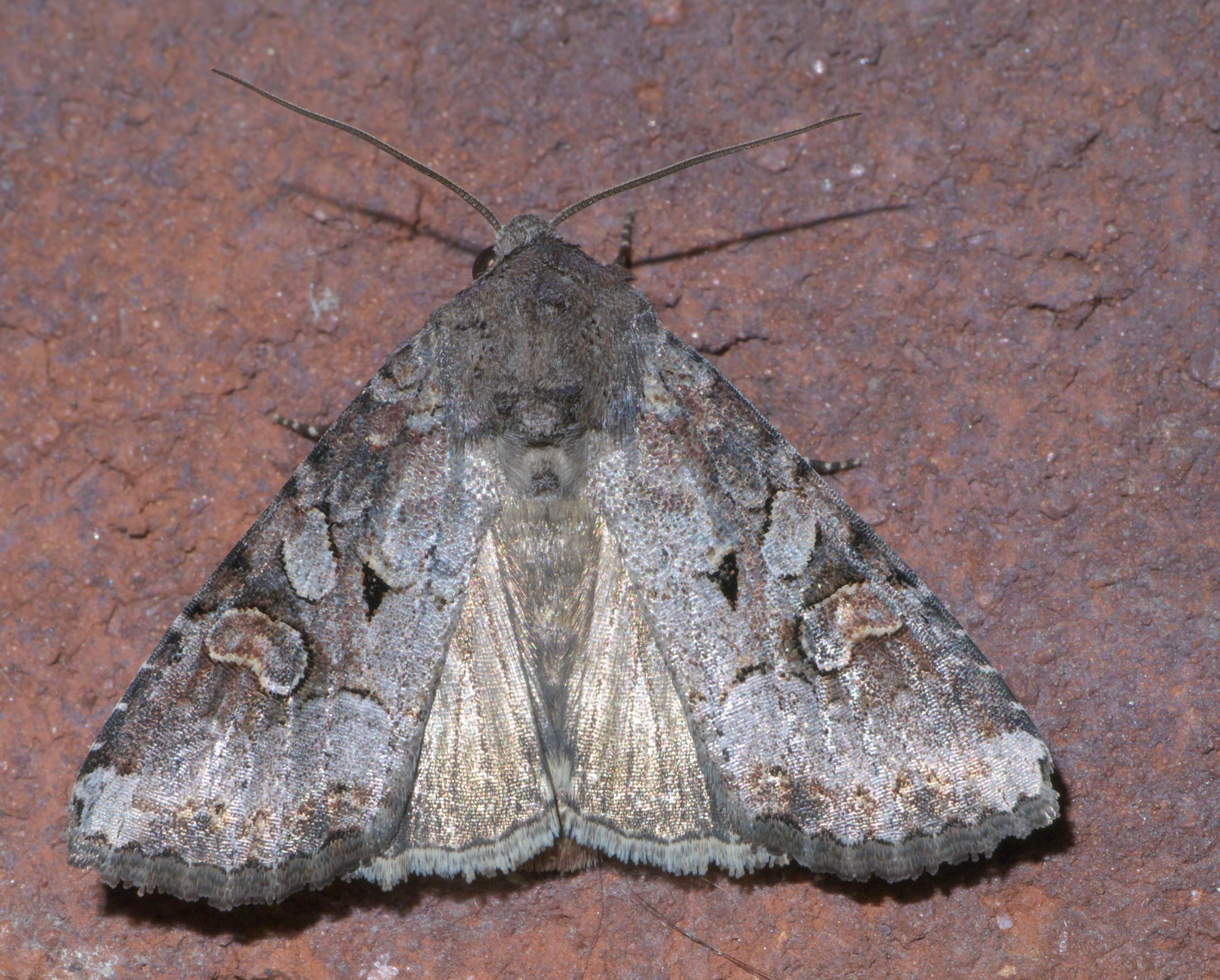

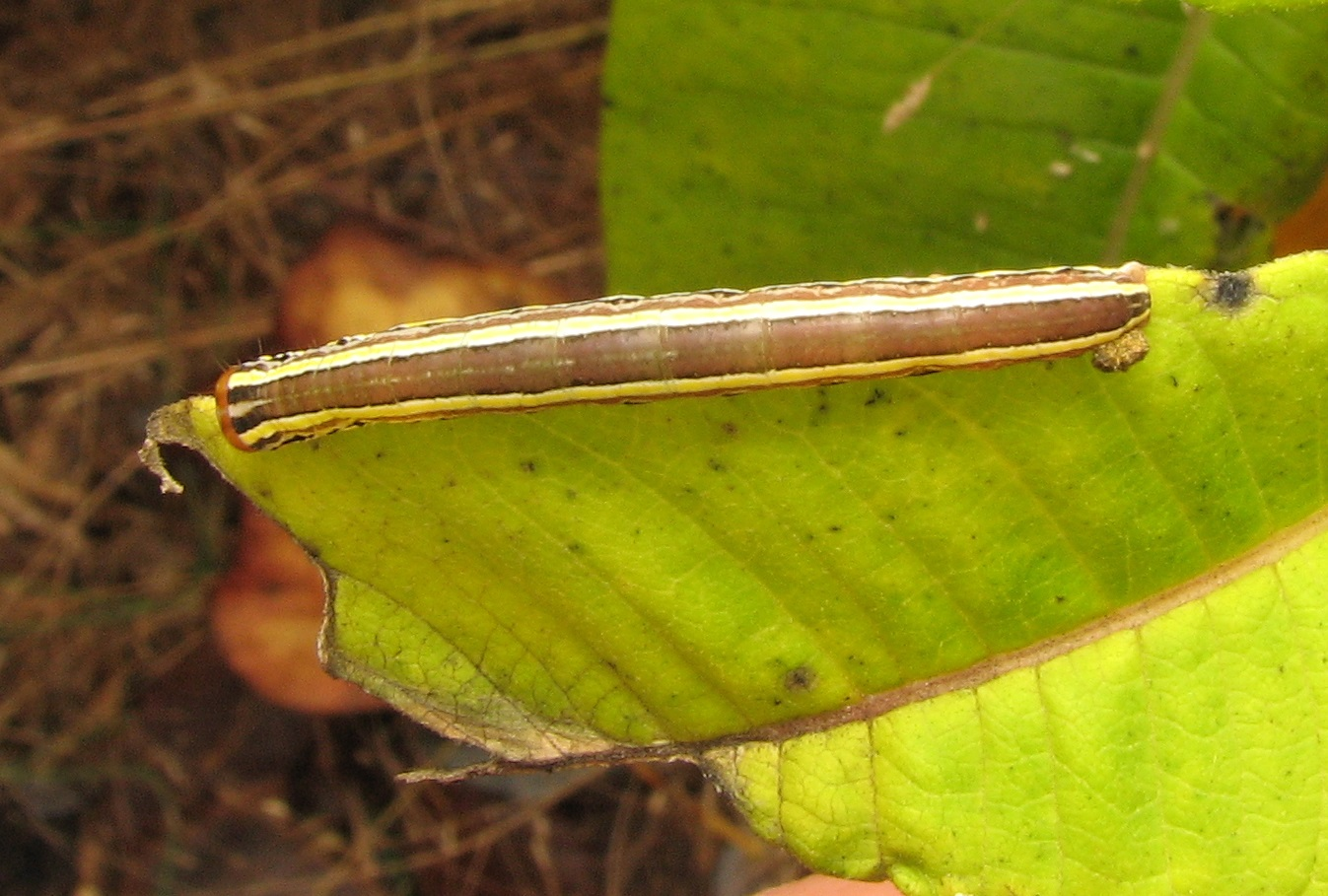
- Adult (top) and larva on milkweed (bottom)

Scientific classification
- Kingdom: Animalia
- Phylum: Arthropoda
- Clade: Pancrustacea
- Class: Insecta
- Order: Lepidoptera
- Superfamily: Noctuoidea
- Family: Noctuidae
- Genus: Trichordestra
- Species: T. legitima

Binomial name
- Trichordestra legitima (Grote, 1864)

Synonyms
- Apamea legitima Grote, 1864; Lacanobia legitima

= Trichordestra legitima =

Species of moth

Trichordestra legitima, the striped garden caterpillar moth, is a moth of the family Noctuidae. The species was first described by Augustus Radcliffe Grote in 1864. It is found in eastern North America, from Newfoundland to Florida, west to Texas, north to Saskatchewan.
