= Simplicivalva philobia =

Scientific classification
- Domain: Eukaryota
- Kingdom: Animalia
- Phylum: Arthropoda
- Class: Insecta
- Order: Lepidoptera
- Family: Cossidae
- Genus: Simplicivalva
- Species: S. philobia

Binomial name
- Simplicivalva philobia (H. Druce, 1898)

Synonyms
- Arbela philobia H. Druce, 1898; Indarbela philobia

Species of moth

Simplicivalva philobia is a moth in the family Cossidae first described by Herbert Druce in 1898. It is found in Panama.
