= Spinulata oblongata =

Scientific classification
- Kingdom: Animalia
- Phylum: Arthropoda
- Class: Insecta
- Order: Lepidoptera
- Family: Cossidae
- Genus: Spinulata
- Species: S. oblongata

Binomial name
- Spinulata oblongata Davis, Gentili-Poole & Mitter, 2008

Species of moth

Spinulata oblongata is a moth in the family Cossidae. It is found in Costa Rica.
