= Spinulata manes =

Scientific classification
- Domain: Eukaryota
- Kingdom: Animalia
- Phylum: Arthropoda
- Class: Insecta
- Order: Lepidoptera
- Family: Cossidae
- Genus: Spinulata
- Species: S. manes

Binomial name
- Spinulata manes (H. Druce, 1898)

Synonyms
- Arbela manes H. Druce, 1898; Cossula manes

Species of moth

Spinulata manes is a moth in the family Cossidae. It is found in Panama.
