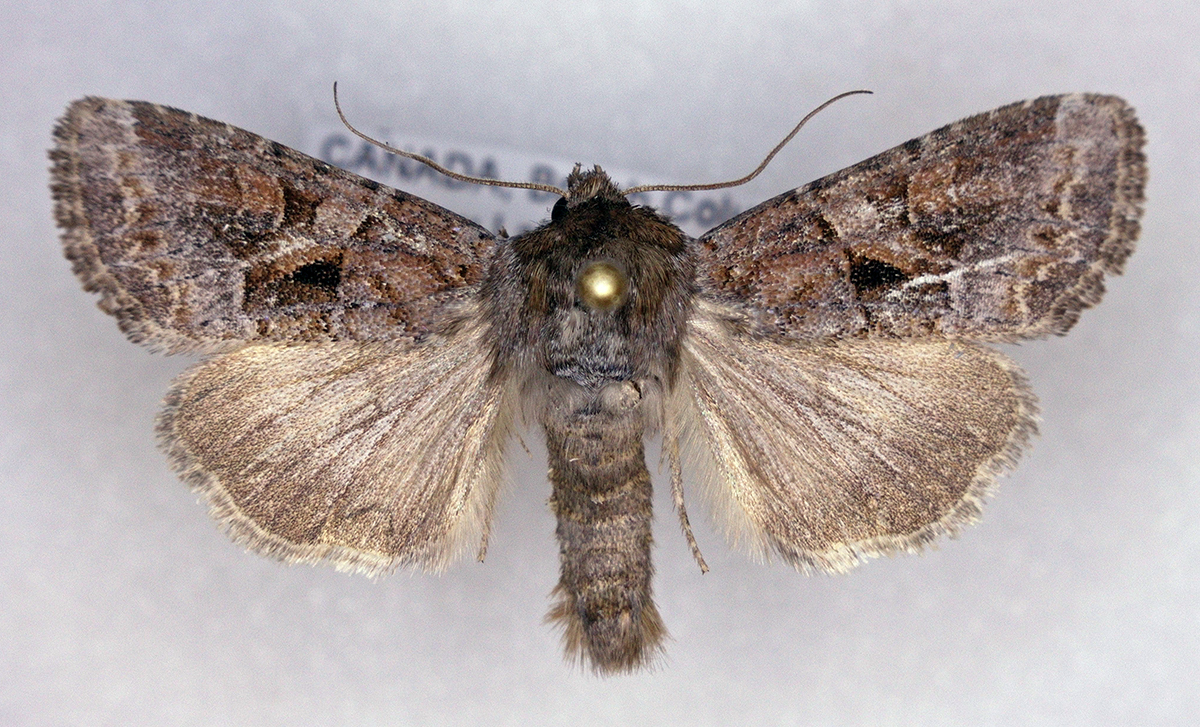

Scientific classification
- Domain: Eukaryota
- Kingdom: Animalia
- Phylum: Arthropoda
- Class: Insecta
- Order: Lepidoptera
- Superfamily: Noctuoidea
- Family: Noctuidae
- Genus: Trichordestra
- Species: T. dodii

Binomial name
- Trichordestra dodii (Smith, 1904)

= Trichordestra dodii =

Species of moth

Trichordestra dodii is a species of cutworm or dart moth in the family Noctuidae. It is found in North America.
