= Trichordestra beanii =

Scientific classification
- Kingdom: Animalia
- Phylum: Arthropoda
- Clade: Pancrustacea
- Class: Insecta
- Order: Lepidoptera
- Superfamily: Noctuoidea
- Family: Noctuidae
- Genus: Trichordestra
- Species: T. beanii

Binomial name
- Trichordestra beanii (Grote, 1877)

Species of moth

Trichordestra beanii is a species of cutworm or dart moth in the family Noctuidae. It was described by Augustus Radcliffe Grote in 1877 and is found in North America.

The MONA or Hodges number for Trichordestra beanii is 10306.
