= Cossula tapajoza =

Scientific classification
- Kingdom: Animalia
- Phylum: Arthropoda
- Class: Insecta
- Order: Lepidoptera
- Family: Cossidae
- Genus: Cossula
- Species: C. tapajoza

Binomial name
- Cossula tapajoza Dyar, 1937

Species of moth

Cossula tapajoza is a moth in the family Cossidae. It is found in the Amazon region.
