= Spinulata =

Scientific classification
- Kingdom: Animalia
- Phylum: Arthropoda
- Class: Insecta
- Order: Lepidoptera
- Family: Cossidae
- Subfamily: Cossulinae
- Genus: Spinulata; Davis, Gentili-Poole & Mitter, 2008

Moth genus in family Cossidae

Spinulata is a genus of moths in the family Cossidae.

== Species ==
- Spinulata acutipennis (Schaus, 1905)
- Spinulata centrosoma (Dyar & Schaus, 1937)
- Spinulata corregis (Dyar & Schaus, 1937)
- Spinulata discopuncta (Schaus, 1901)
- Spinulata julius (Schaus, 1921)
- Spinulata manes (Druce, 1898)
- Spinulata maruga (Schaus, 1901)
- Spinulata oblongata Davis, Gentili-Poole & Mitter, 2008
- Spinulata quasivinnea Davis, Gentili-Poole & Mitter, 2008
- Spinulata rille (Dyar & Schaus, 1937)
- Spinulata ryssa (Dyar & Schaus, 1937)
