= Biocellata davisorum =

Scientific classification
- Kingdom: Animalia
- Phylum: Arthropoda
- Class: Insecta
- Order: Lepidoptera
- Family: Cossidae
- Genus: Biocellata
- Species: B. davisorum

Binomial name
- Biocellata davisorum Davis, Gentili-Poole & Mitter, 2008

Species of moth

Biocellata davisorum is a moth in the family Cossidae. It is found in Colombia.
