= Schausiania philoba =

Scientific classification
- Kingdom: Animalia
- Phylum: Arthropoda
- Class: Insecta
- Order: Lepidoptera
- Family: Cossidae
- Genus: Schausiania
- Species: S. philoba

Binomial name
- Schausiania philoba H. Druce, 1898

Species of moth

Schausiania philoba is a moth in the family Cossidae first described by Herbert Druce in 1898.
