= Schausiania ophthalmodes =

Scientific classification
- Kingdom: Animalia
- Phylum: Arthropoda
- Class: Insecta
- Order: Lepidoptera
- Family: Cossidae
- Genus: Schausiania
- Species: S. ophthalmodes

Binomial name
- Schausiania ophthalmodes Hering, 1923

Species of moth

Schausiania ophthalmodes is a moth in the family Cossidae. It is found in South America.
