= Pterotaea newcombi =

Scientific classification
- Kingdom: Animalia
- Phylum: Arthropoda
- Class: Insecta
- Order: Lepidoptera
- Family: Geometridae
- Tribe: Boarmiini
- Genus: Pterotaea
- Species: P. newcombi

Binomial name
- Pterotaea newcombi (Swett, 1914)

Species of moth

Pterotaea newcombi is a species of geometrid moth in the family Geometridae. It is found in North America.

The MONA or Hodges number for Pterotaea newcombi is 6569.

== Subspecies ==
These two subspecies belong to the species Pterotaea newcombi:

- Pterotaea newcombi newcombi
- Pterotaea newcombi orinomos Rindge, 1970
