= Schausiania ecparilis =

Scientific classification
- Kingdom: Animalia
- Phylum: Arthropoda
- Class: Insecta
- Order: Lepidoptera
- Family: Cossidae
- Genus: Schausiania
- Species: S. ecparilis

Binomial name
- Schausiania ecparilis (Schaus, 1905)

Synonyms
- Hemipecten ecparilis Schaus, 1905

Species of moth

Schausiania ecparilis is a moth in the family Cossidae. It is found in Brazil.
