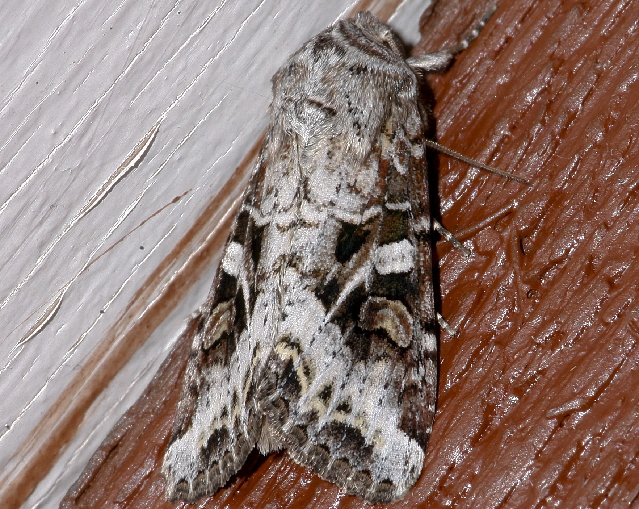

Scientific classification
- Kingdom: Animalia
- Phylum: Arthropoda
- Class: Insecta
- Order: Lepidoptera
- Superfamily: Noctuoidea
- Family: Noctuidae
- Genus: Trichordestra
- Species: T. liquida

Binomial name
- Trichordestra liquida (Grote, 1881)

= Trichordestra liquida =

Species of moth

Trichordestra liquida is a species of cutworm or dart moth in the family Noctuidae. It is found in North America.

The MONA or Hodges number for Trichordestra liquida is 10308.
