= Biocellata =

Scientific classification
- Kingdom: Animalia
- Phylum: Arthropoda
- Class: Insecta
- Order: Lepidoptera
- Family: Cossidae
- Subfamily: Cossulinae
- Genus: Biocellata; Davis, Gentili-Poole & Mitter, 2008

Moth genus in family Cossidae

Biocellata is a genus of moths in the family Cossidae.

== Species ==
- Biocellata alfarae
- Biocellata bifida
- Biocellata bistellata
- Biocellata davisorum
- Biocellata ockendeni
- Biocellata praeclara
- Biocellata rotundipuncta
