= Biocellata ockendeni =

Scientific classification
- Kingdom: Animalia
- Phylum: Arthropoda
- Class: Insecta
- Order: Lepidoptera
- Family: Cossidae
- Genus: Biocellata
- Species: B. ockendeni

Binomial name
- Biocellata ockendeni (H. Druce, 1906)

Species of moth

Biocellata ockendeni is a moth in the family Cossidae first described by Herbert Druce in 1906.
