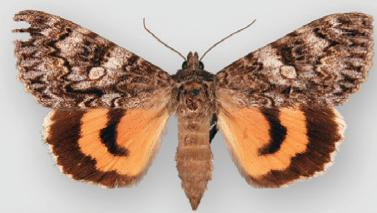

Scientific classification
- Kingdom: Animalia
- Phylum: Arthropoda
- Class: Insecta
- Order: Lepidoptera
- Superfamily: Noctuoidea
- Family: Erebidae
- Genus: Catocala
- Species: C. allusa

Binomial name
- Catocala allusa Hulst, 1884

Synonyms
- Catocala frenchii Poling, 1901; Catocala faustina allusa; Catocala caerulea Beutenmüller, 1907; Catocala cleopatra caerulea

= Catocala allusa =

Species of moth

Catocala allusa or Catocala faustina allusa is a moth of the family Erebidae. It is found from British Columbia, south through Washington to northern California. It is also found in Oregon and possibly western Nevada.

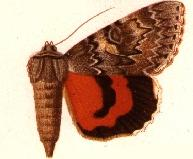
Illustration

Adults are on wing from July to August depending on the location. There is probably one generation per year.

The larvae feed on Populus and Salix species.
