= Austrocossus =

Scientific classification
- Kingdom: Animalia
- Phylum: Arthropoda
- Clade: Pancrustacea
- Class: Insecta
- Order: Lepidoptera
- Family: Cossidae
- Subfamily: Cossulinae
- Genus: Austrocossus; Gentili, 1989
- Species: A. minutus

Binomial name
- Austrocossus minutus Gentili, 1989

Species of moth

Austrocossus minutus is a moth in the family Cossidae, and the only species in the genus Austrocossus. It is found in Argentina.
