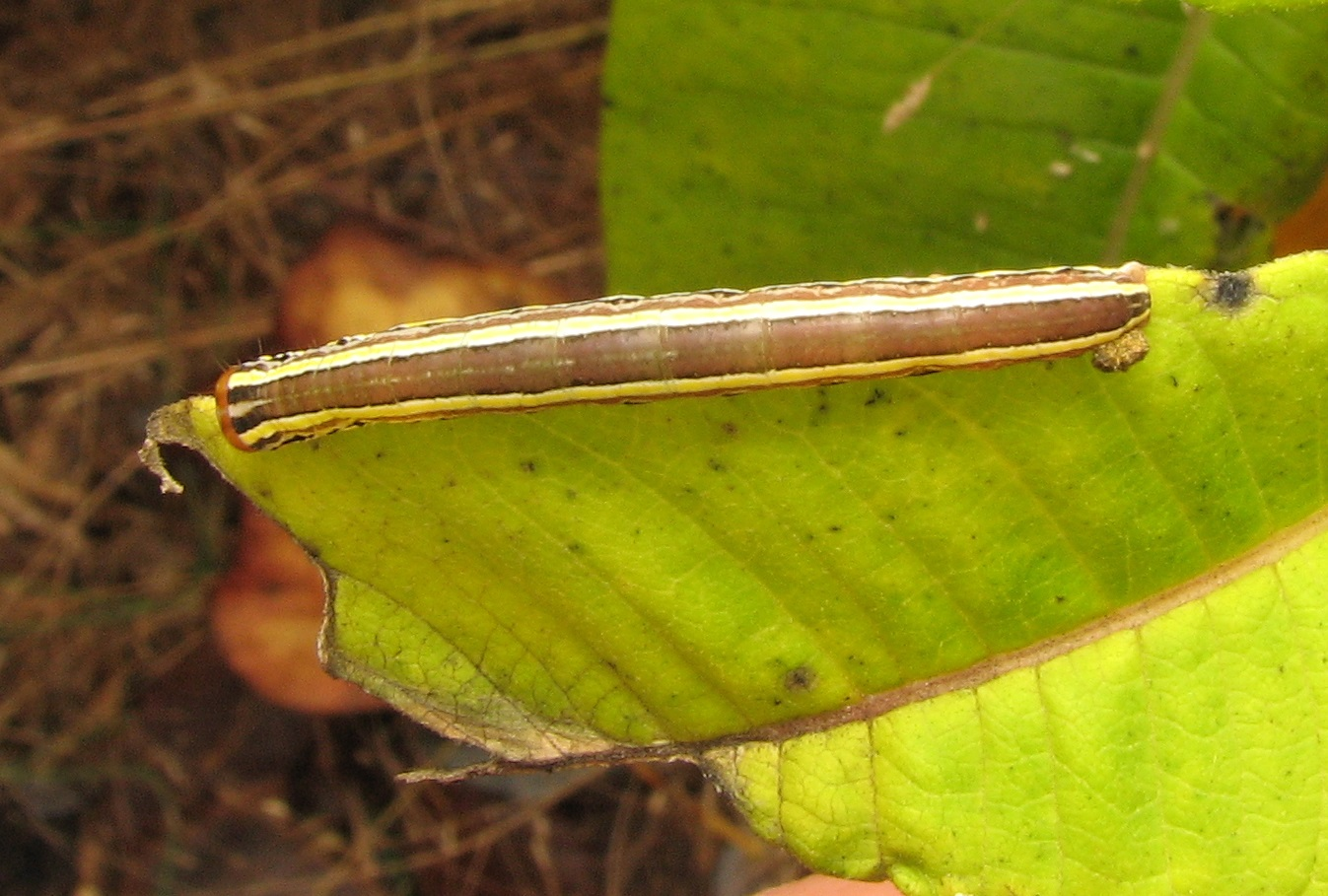
- Trichordestra legitima caterpillar on milkweed

Scientific classification
- Domain: Eukaryota
- Kingdom: Animalia
- Phylum: Arthropoda
- Class: Insecta
- Order: Lepidoptera
- Superfamily: Noctuoidea
- Family: Noctuidae
- Subfamily: Noctuinae
- Tribe: Hadenini
- Genus: Trichordestra; McCabe, 1980

= Trichordestra =

Genus of moths

Trichordestra is a genus of moths of the family Noctuidae.

== Species ==
- Trichordestra beanii (Grote, 1877) (alternative spelling Trichordestra beani)
- Trichordestra dodii (Smith, 1904)
- Trichordestra legitima (Grote, 1864)
- Trichordestra lilacina (Harvey, 1874)
- Trichordestra liquida (Grote, 1881)
- Trichordestra prodeniformis (Smith, 1888)
- Trichordestra rugosa (Morrison, 1875)
- Trichordestra tacoma (Strecker, 1900)
