= Spinulata acutipennis =

Scientific classification
- Kingdom: Animalia
- Phylum: Arthropoda
- Clade: Pancrustacea
- Class: Insecta
- Order: Lepidoptera
- Family: Cossidae
- Subfamily: Cossulinae
- Genus: Spinulata
- Species: S. acutipennis

Binomial name
- Spinulata acutipennis (Schaus, 1905)

Synonyms
- Hemipecten acutipennis Schaus, 1905; Hemipectrona vinnea Schaus, 1921; Cossula vinnea; Cossus acutipennis

Species of moth

Spinulata acutipennis is a moth in the family Cossidae. It is found in Guatemala.

The wingspan is about 37 mm. The forewings are crossed by short and indistinct pale brown lines. There is a large fuscous brown spot in the cell and a small vertical streak below the cell before the middle, as well as a short horizontal dark brown streak above the inner margin antemedially. The costal margin is medially shaded with grey, beyond it shaded with brown. The hindwings are white.
