= Pterotaea cariosa =

Scientific classification
- Domain: Eukaryota
- Kingdom: Animalia
- Phylum: Arthropoda
- Class: Insecta
- Order: Lepidoptera
- Family: Geometridae
- Tribe: Boarmiini
- Genus: Pterotaea
- Species: P. cariosa

Binomial name
- Pterotaea cariosa Hulst, 1896

Species of moth

Pterotaea cariosa is a species of geometrid moth in the family Geometridae. It is found in North America.

The MONA or Hodges number for Pterotaea cariosa is 6568.

== Subspecies ==
These three subspecies belong to the species Pterotaea cariosa:

- Pterotaea cariosa aporema Rindge, 1970
- Pterotaea cariosa cariosa
- Pterotaea cariosa incompta Rindge, 1970
