= Simplicivalva ampliophilobia =

Scientific classification
- Kingdom: Animalia
- Phylum: Arthropoda
- Class: Insecta
- Order: Lepidoptera
- Family: Cossidae
- Genus: Simplicivalva
- Species: S. ampliophilobia

Binomial name
- Simplicivalva ampliophilobia Davis, Gentili-Poole & Mitter, 2008

Species of moth

Simplicivalva ampliophilobia is a moth in the family Cossidae. It is found in Costa Rica.
