= Cossula albicosta =

Scientific classification
- Domain: Eukaryota
- Kingdom: Animalia
- Phylum: Arthropoda
- Class: Insecta
- Order: Lepidoptera
- Family: Cossidae
- Genus: Cossula
- Species: C. albicosta

Binomial name
- Cossula albicosta Schaus, 1911

Species of moth

Cossula albicosta is a moth in the family Cossidae. It is found in Costa Rica.
