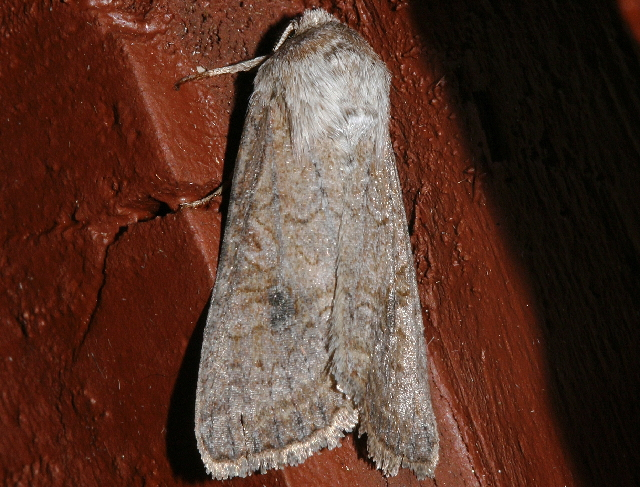

Scientific classification
- Domain: Eukaryota
- Kingdom: Animalia
- Phylum: Arthropoda
- Class: Insecta
- Order: Lepidoptera
- Superfamily: Noctuoidea
- Family: Noctuidae
- Genus: Trichordestra
- Species: T. lilacina

Binomial name
- Trichordestra lilacina (Harvey, 1874)

= Trichordestra lilacina =

Species of moth

Trichordestra lilacina, the aster cutworm, is a species of cutworm or dart moth in the family Noctuidae. It is found in North America.

The MONA or Hodges number for Trichordestra lilacina is 10307.
