= Cossula coerulescens =

Scientific classification
- Domain: Eukaryota
- Kingdom: Animalia
- Phylum: Arthropoda
- Class: Insecta
- Order: Lepidoptera
- Family: Cossidae
- Genus: Cossula
- Species: C. coerulescens

Binomial name
- Cossula coerulescens Schaus, 1911

Synonyms
- Cossula caerulescens Dalla Torre, 1923; Allostylus coerulescens Schaus, 1911

Species of moth

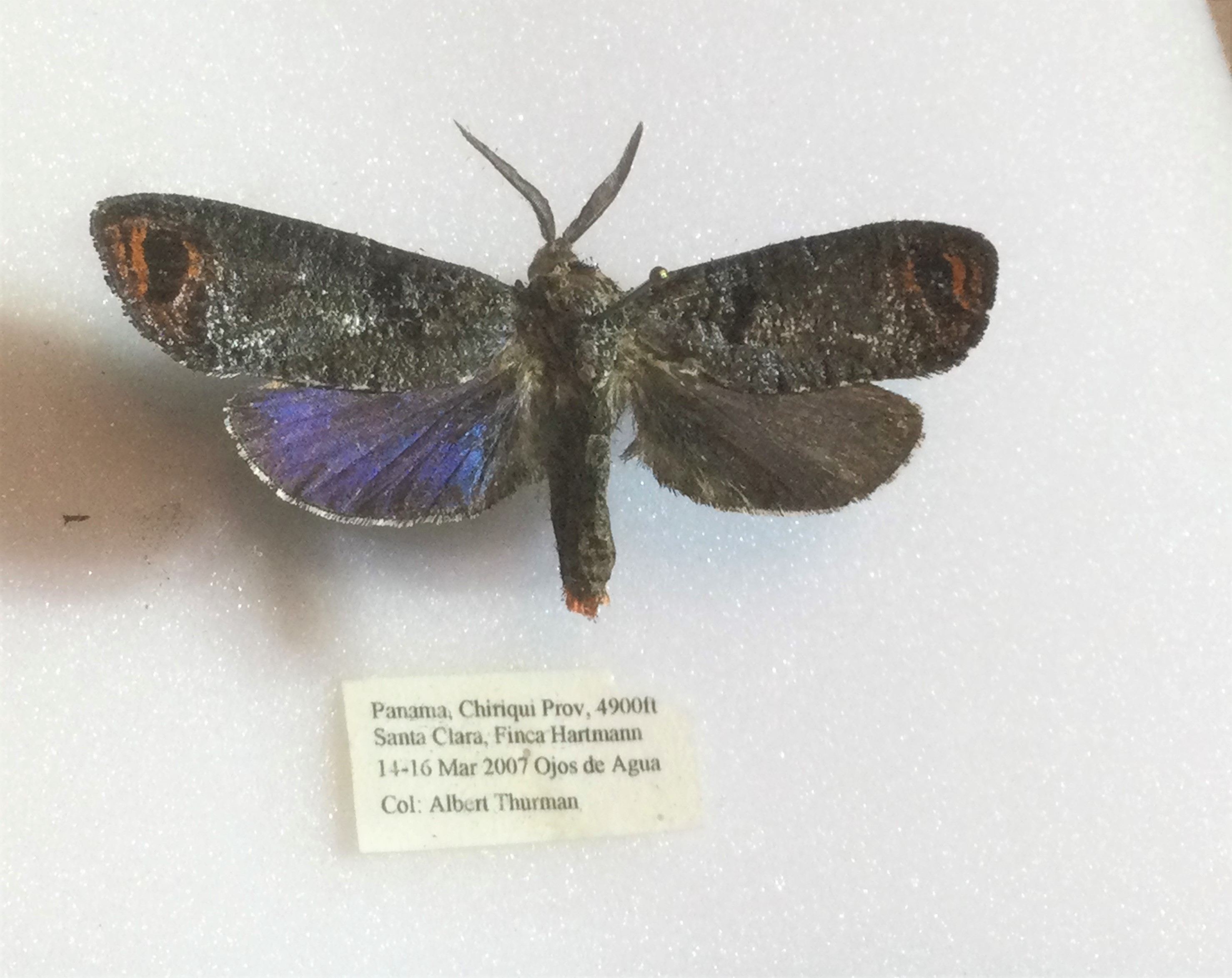
Cossula coerulescens Finca Hartmann Panama March 2007

Cossula coerulescens is a moth in the family Cossidae. It is found in Costa Rica and Panama.
