= Spinulata corregis =

Scientific classification
- Kingdom: Animalia
- Phylum: Arthropoda
- Class: Insecta
- Order: Lepidoptera
- Family: Cossidae
- Genus: Spinulata
- Species: S. corregis

Binomial name
- Spinulata corregis (Dyar & Schaus, 1937)

Synonyms
- Cossula corregis Dyar & Schaus, 1937

Species of moth

Spinulata corregis is a moth in the family Cossidae. It is found in Brazil.
