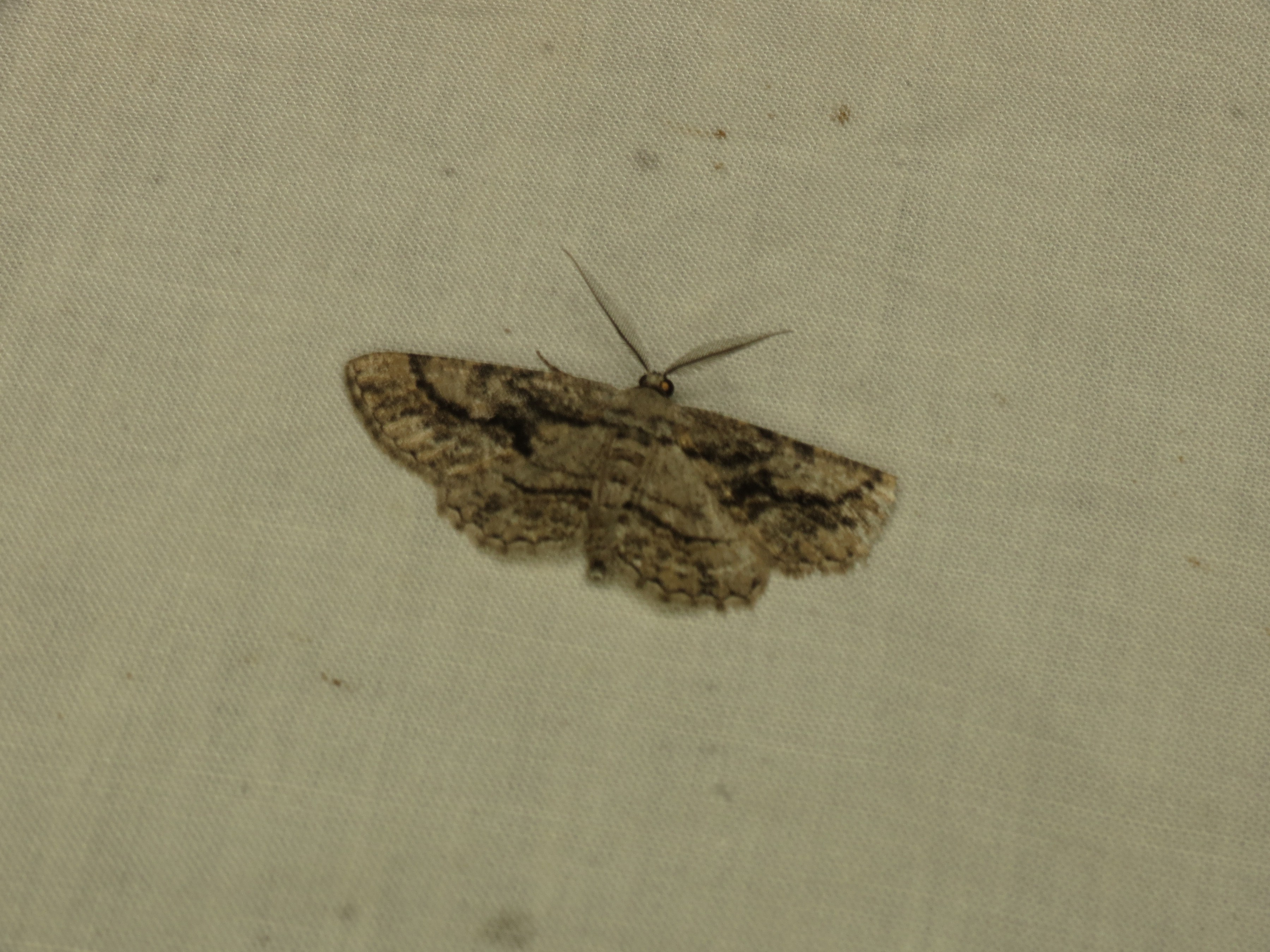

Scientific classification
- Domain: Eukaryota
- Kingdom: Animalia
- Phylum: Arthropoda
- Class: Insecta
- Order: Lepidoptera
- Family: Geometridae
- Genus: Pterotaea
- Species: P. albescens

Binomial name
- Pterotaea albescens McDunnough, 1941

= Pterotaea albescens =

Species of moth

Pterotaea albescens is a moth of the family Geometridae. It is found in California and Oregon.
