= Cossula omaia =

Scientific classification
- Kingdom: Animalia
- Phylum: Arthropoda
- Clade: Pancrustacea
- Class: Insecta
- Order: Lepidoptera
- Family: Cossidae
- Genus: Cossula
- Species: C. omaia

Binomial name
- Cossula omaia Schaus, 1921

Species of moth

Cossula omaia is a moth in the family Cossidae. It is found in Guyana.

The wingspan is about 70 mm. The forewings are dark purple brown, shaded with reddish brown on the inner margin and with faint darker striae. The hindwings are fuscous brown.
