= Biocellata bifida =

Scientific classification
- Kingdom: Animalia
- Phylum: Arthropoda
- Class: Insecta
- Order: Lepidoptera
- Family: Cossidae
- Genus: Biocellata
- Species: B. bifida

Binomial name
- Biocellata bifida Davis, Gentili-Poole & Mitter, 2008

Species of moth

Biocellata bifida is a moth in the family Cossidae. It is found in Costa Rica.
