= Costria elegans =

Scientific classification
- Kingdom: Animalia
- Phylum: Arthropoda
- Class: Insecta
- Order: Lepidoptera
- Family: Cossidae
- Genus: Costria
- Species: C. elegans

Binomial name
- Costria elegans Schaus, 1901

Species of insect

Costria elegans is a species of moth in the family Cossidae. It was described by William Schaus in 1901 and is found in South America (Brazil, Colombia, French Guiana).

The wingspan is about 25 mm. The forewings are whitish buff, shaded with light brown. There are black and brown striae evenly distributed over the surface. The costa, except at the base and outer third, is dark brown and the outer margin is occupied by a large dark space, inwardly curved and limited by a dark velvety-brown shade. The space contiguous to this toward the base is without striae and appears like a pale line, while the space within the curved brown line and a terminal dark brown line is dark olivaceous above vein 5, and lilacine white below it. There is a small dark brown spot on the lilacine portion and the fringe is pale brown. The hindwings and base of the fringe are pale brown, while the fringe terminally is white.
