= Magulacra =

Scientific classification
- Kingdom: Animalia
- Phylum: Arthropoda
- Clade: Pancrustacea
- Class: Insecta
- Order: Lepidoptera
- Family: Cossidae
- Subfamily: Cossulinae
- Genus: Magulacra; Davis, Gentili-Poole & Mitter, 2008

Moth genus in family Cossidae

Magulacra is a genus of moths in the family Cossidae.

The forewing length is 8–20 mm (0.31–0.79 in) in males and 17–18 mm (0.67–0.71 in) in females.

== Species ==
There are five accepted species:

- Magulacra albimacula
- Magulacra cleptes
- Magulacra nigripennata
- Magulacra niveogrisea
- Magulacra notodontoides
