= Cossula magna =

Scientific classification
- Domain: Eukaryota
- Kingdom: Animalia
- Phylum: Arthropoda
- Class: Insecta
- Order: Lepidoptera
- Family: Cossidae
- Genus: Cossula
- Species: C. magna

Binomial name
- Cossula magna Schaus, 1905

Species of moth

Cossula magna is a moth in the family Cossidae. It is found in Guyana.
