= Schausiania furfurens =

Scientific classification
- Kingdom: Animalia
- Phylum: Arthropoda
- Class: Insecta
- Order: Lepidoptera
- Family: Cossidae
- Genus: Schausiania
- Species: S. furfurens

Binomial name
- Schausiania furfurens Hering, 1923

Species of moth

Schausiania furfurens is a moth in the family Cossidae. It is found in South America.
