= Trichordestra prodeniformis =

Scientific classification
- Domain: Eukaryota
- Kingdom: Animalia
- Phylum: Arthropoda
- Class: Insecta
- Order: Lepidoptera
- Superfamily: Noctuoidea
- Family: Noctuidae
- Tribe: Hadenini
- Genus: Trichordestra
- Species: T. prodeniformis

Binomial name
- Trichordestra prodeniformis (Smith, 1888)

Species of moth

Trichordestra prodeniformis is a species of cutworm or dart moth in the family Noctuidae. It is found in Central America and North America.

The MONA or Hodges number for Trichordestra prodeniformis is 10309.
