= Spinulata centrosoma =

Scientific classification
- Domain: Eukaryota
- Kingdom: Animalia
- Phylum: Arthropoda
- Class: Insecta
- Order: Lepidoptera
- Family: Cossidae
- Genus: Spinulata
- Species: S. centrosoma

Binomial name
- Spinulata centrosoma (Dyar & Schaus, 1937)

Synonyms
- Cossula centrosoma Dyar & Schaus, 1937

Species of moth

Spinulata centrosoma is a moth in the family Cossidae. It is found in Colombia.
