= Cossula wellingi =

Scientific classification
- Kingdom: Animalia
- Phylum: Arthropoda
- Clade: Pancrustacea
- Class: Insecta
- Order: Lepidoptera
- Family: Cossidae
- Genus: Cossula
- Species: C. wellingi

Binomial name
- Cossula wellingi Clench, 1961

Species of moth

Cossula wellingi is a moth in the family Cossidae. It is found in Mexico.
