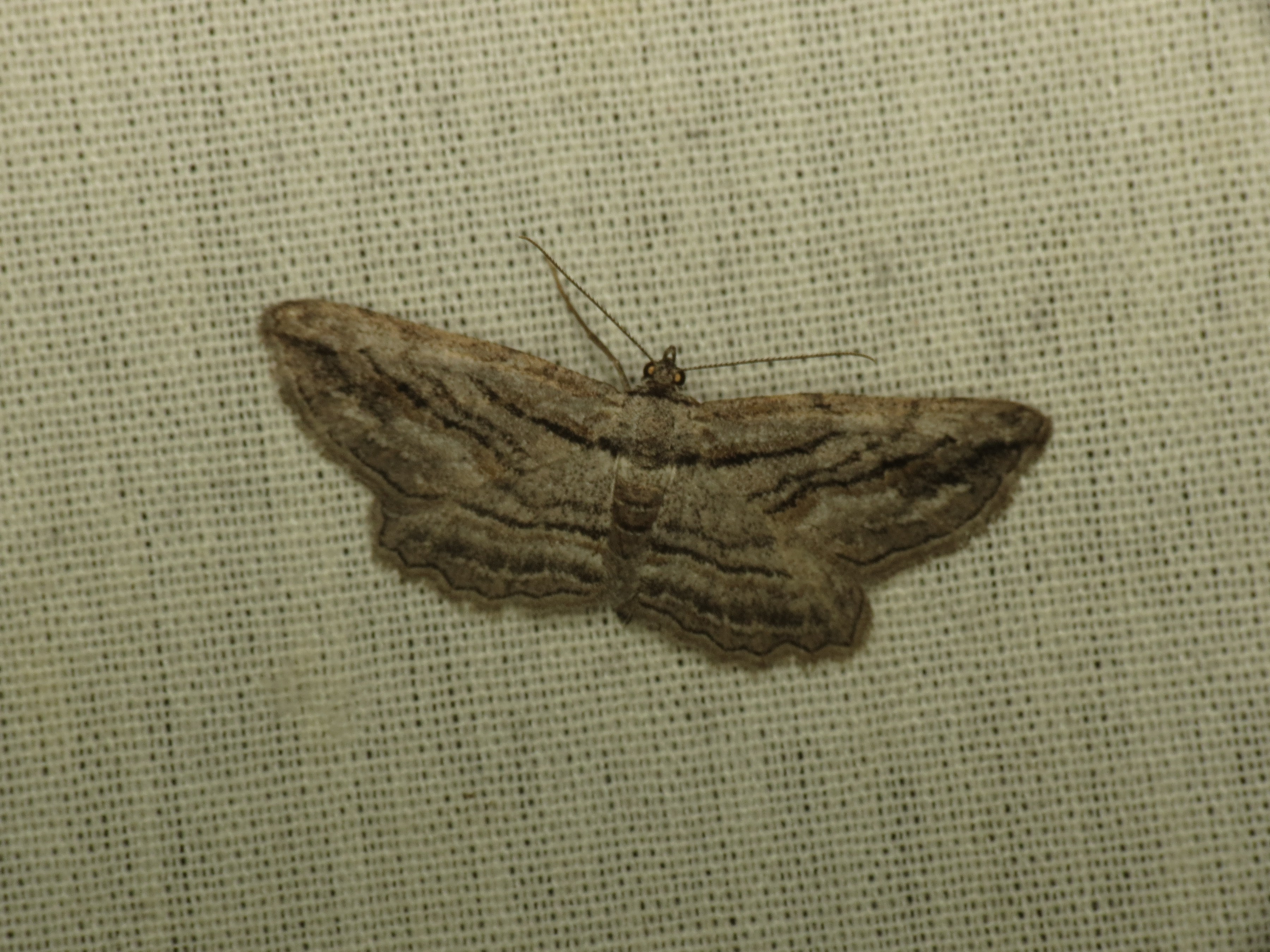
- Pterotaea species

Scientific classification
- Kingdom: Animalia
- Phylum: Arthropoda
- Class: Insecta
- Order: Lepidoptera
- Family: Geometridae
- Tribe: Boarmiini
- Genus: Pterotaea; Hulst, 1896

= Pterotaea =

Genus of moths

Pterotaea is a genus of moths in the family Geometridae.

== Species ==
- Pterotaea albescens McDunnough, 1941
- Pterotaea campestraria McDunnough, 1941
- Pterotaea cariosa Hulst, 1896
- Pterotaea cavea Rindge, 1970
- Pterotaea comstocki Rindge, 1970
- Pterotaea crickmeri (Sperry, 1946)
- Pterotaea crinigera Rindge, 1970
- Pterotaea depromaria (Grote, 1883)
- Pterotaea euroa Rindge, 1970
- Pterotaea expallida Rindge, 1976
- Pterotaea glauca Rindge, 1970
- Pterotaea lamiaria (Strecker, 1899)
- Pterotaea leuschneri Rindge, 1970
- Pterotaea lira Rindge, 1970
- Pterotaea macrocercos Rindge, 1970
- Pterotaea melanocarpa (Swett, 1916)
- Pterotaea miscella Rindge, 1970
- Pterotaea newcombi (Swett, 1914)
- Pterotaea obscura Rindge, 1970
- Pterotaea plagia Rindge, 1970
- Pterotaea powelli Rindge, 1970
- Pterotaea salvatierrai Rindge, 1970
- Pterotaea sperryae McDunnough, 1938
- Pterotaea spinigera Rindge, 1976
- Pterotaea succurva Rindge, 1970
- Pterotaea systole Rindge, 1970
