= Schausiania arpiodes =

Scientific classification
- Kingdom: Animalia
- Phylum: Arthropoda
- Class: Insecta
- Order: Lepidoptera
- Family: Cossidae
- Genus: Schausiania
- Species: S. arpiodes

Binomial name
- Schausiania arpiodes (Dognin, 1923)

Synonyms
- Hemipectrona arpiodes Dognin, 1923

Species of moth

Schausiania arpiodes is a moth in the family Cossidae. It is found in the Amazon region.
