= Trichordestra rugosa =

Scientific classification
- Domain: Eukaryota
- Kingdom: Animalia
- Phylum: Arthropoda
- Class: Insecta
- Order: Lepidoptera
- Superfamily: Noctuoidea
- Family: Noctuidae
- Tribe: Hadenini
- Genus: Trichordestra
- Species: T. rugosa

Binomial name
- Trichordestra rugosa (Morrison, 1875)

Species of moth

Trichordestra rugosa, the wrinkled trichordestra, is a species of cutworm or dart moth in the family Noctuidae. It is found in North America.

The MONA or Hodges number for Trichordestra rugosa is 10302.
