= Cossula longirostrum =

Scientific classification
- Kingdom: Animalia
- Phylum: Arthropoda
- Class: Insecta
- Order: Lepidoptera
- Family: Cossidae
- Genus: Cossula
- Species: C. longirostrum

Binomial name
- Cossula longirostrum Davis, Gentili-Poole & Mitter, 2008

Species of moth

Cossula longirostrum is a moth in the family Cossidae. It is found in Costa Rica.
