= Spinulata discopuncta =

Scientific classification
- Domain: Eukaryota
- Kingdom: Animalia
- Phylum: Arthropoda
- Class: Insecta
- Order: Lepidoptera
- Family: Cossidae
- Subfamily: Cossulinae
- Genus: Spinulata
- Species: S. discopuncta

Binomial name
- Spinulata discopuncta (Schaus, 1901)

Synonyms
- Costria discopuncta Schaus, 1901

Species of insect

Spinulata discopuncta is a moth in the family Cossidae. It is found in Brazil.
