= Cossula stoica =

Scientific classification
- Domain: Eukaryota
- Kingdom: Animalia
- Phylum: Arthropoda
- Class: Insecta
- Order: Lepidoptera
- Family: Cossidae
- Genus: Cossula
- Species: C. stoica

Binomial name
- Cossula stoica Dognin, 1922

Species of moth

Cossula stoica is a moth in the family Cossidae. It is found in Bolivia.
