= Magulacra cleptes =

Scientific classification
- Kingdom: Animalia
- Phylum: Arthropoda
- Clade: Pancrustacea
- Class: Insecta
- Order: Lepidoptera
- Family: Cossidae
- Genus: Magulacra
- Species: M. cleptes

Binomial name
- Magulacra cleptes (Dyar, 1910)

Synonyms
- Hemipecten cleptes Dyar, 1910

Species of moth

Magulacra cleptes is a moth in the family Cossidae. It is found in Guyana. It has been described: thorax light gray the abdomen darker gray, intermixed with brown outwardly. The fore wings are light gray, with a curved band around end of cell to vein 1, darker leaden gray. There is a large rounded patch on outer margin dark velvety brown, a little lighter and more leaden along the margin. This patch is edged inwardly by a line of the light ground color, and a small dark marginal spot. The dark mark is in the center of the cell. Hind wing uniformly grayish brown. Expanse, 37 mm.
