= Magulacra notodontoides =

Scientific classification
- Domain: Eukaryota
- Kingdom: Animalia
- Phylum: Arthropoda
- Class: Insecta
- Order: Lepidoptera
- Family: Cossidae
- Genus: Magulacra
- Species: M. notodontoides

Binomial name
- Magulacra notodontoides (Schaus, 1892)

Synonyms
- Cossula notodontoides Schaus, 1892

Species of moth

Magulacra notodontoides is a moth in the family Cossidae. It is found in Brazil.
