= Simplicivalva eberti =

Scientific classification
- Kingdom: Animalia
- Phylum: Arthropoda
- Clade: Pancrustacea
- Class: Insecta
- Order: Lepidoptera
- Family: Cossidae
- Genus: Simplicivalva
- Species: S. eberti

Binomial name
- Simplicivalva eberti (Clench, 1961)

Synonyms
- Cossula eberti Clench, 1961

Species of moth

Simplicivalva eberti is a moth in the family Cossidae. It is found in Brazil.
