= Simplicivalva morgani =

Scientific classification
- Kingdom: Animalia
- Phylum: Arthropoda
- Clade: Pancrustacea
- Class: Insecta
- Order: Lepidoptera
- Family: Cossidae
- Genus: Simplicivalva
- Species: S. morgani

Binomial name
- Simplicivalva morgani (Clench, 1957)

Synonyms
- Cossula morgani Clench, 1957

Species of moth

Simplicivalva morgani is a moth in the family Cossidae. It is found on Jamaica.
