= Simplicivalva marmorata =

Scientific classification
- Domain: Eukaryota
- Kingdom: Animalia
- Phylum: Arthropoda
- Class: Insecta
- Order: Lepidoptera
- Family: Cossidae
- Genus: Simplicivalva
- Species: S. marmorata

Binomial name
- Simplicivalva marmorata (Schaus, 1905)

Synonyms
- Hemipecten marmorata Schaus, 1905; Schausiania marmorata

Species of moth

Simplicivalva marmorata is a moth in the family Cossidae. It is found in French Guiana.
