= Simplicivalva interrogationis =

Scientific classification
- Kingdom: Animalia
- Phylum: Arthropoda
- Class: Insecta
- Order: Lepidoptera
- Family: Cossidae
- Genus: Simplicivalva
- Species: S. interrogationis

Binomial name
- Simplicivalva interrogationis (Dyar & Schaus, 1937)

Synonyms
- Cossula interrogationis Dyar & Schaus, 1937

Species of moth

Simplicivalva interrogationis is a moth in the family Cossidae. It is found in Brazil.
