= Cossula arpi =

Scientific classification
- Domain: Eukaryota
- Kingdom: Animalia
- Phylum: Arthropoda
- Class: Insecta
- Order: Lepidoptera
- Family: Cossidae
- Genus: Cossula
- Species: C. arpi

Binomial name
- Cossula arpi (Schaus, 1901)

Synonyms
- Costria arpi Schaus, 1901; Cossula nigripuncta Dognin, 1916

Species of moth

Cossula arpi is a moth in the family Cossidae. It is found in Brazil and Colombia.
