= Spinulata maruga =

Scientific classification
- Domain: Eukaryota
- Kingdom: Animalia
- Phylum: Arthropoda
- Class: Insecta
- Order: Lepidoptera
- Family: Cossidae
- Genus: Spinulata
- Species: S. maruga

Binomial name
- Spinulata maruga (Schaus, 1901)

Synonyms
- Costria maruga Schaus, 1901

Species of moth

Spinulata maruga is a moth in the family Cossidae. It is found in Brazil (Parana).
