= Cossula cossuloides =

Scientific classification
- Domain: Eukaryota
- Kingdom: Animalia
- Phylum: Arthropoda
- Class: Insecta
- Order: Lepidoptera
- Family: Cossidae
- Genus: Cossula
- Species: C. cossuloides

Binomial name
- Cossula cossuloides (Schaus, 1905)

Synonyms
- Hemipecten cossuloides Schaus, 1905

Species of moth

Cossula cossuloides is a moth in the family Cossidae. It is found in French Guiana.
