= Cossula gaudeator =

Scientific classification
- Domain: Eukaryota
- Kingdom: Animalia
- Phylum: Arthropoda
- Class: Insecta
- Order: Lepidoptera
- Family: Cossidae
- Genus: Cossula
- Species: C. gaudeator

Binomial name
- Cossula gaudeator (Schaus, 1911)

Synonyms
- Hemipecten gaudeator Schaus, 1911

Species of moth

Cossula gaudeator is a moth in the family Cossidae. It is found in Costa Rica.
