= Simplicivalva poecilosema =

Scientific classification
- Kingdom: Animalia
- Phylum: Arthropoda
- Clade: Pancrustacea
- Class: Insecta
- Order: Lepidoptera
- Family: Cossidae
- Genus: Simplicivalva
- Species: S. poecilosema

Binomial name
- Simplicivalva poecilosema (Clench, 1961)

Synonyms
- Cossula poecilosema Clench, 1961

Species of moth

Simplicivalva poecilosema is a moth in the family Cossidae. It is found in Bolivia.
