= Biocellata alfarae =

Scientific classification
- Kingdom: Animalia
- Phylum: Arthropoda
- Class: Insecta
- Order: Lepidoptera
- Family: Cossidae
- Genus: Biocellata
- Species: B. alfarae

Binomial name
- Biocellata alfarae (Schaus, 1911)

Synonyms
- Hemipecten alfarae Schaus, 1911; Cossula alfarae

Species of moth

Biocellata alfarae is a moth in the family Cossidae. It is found in Costa Rica.
