= Simplicivalva charmion =

Scientific classification
- Domain: Eukaryota
- Kingdom: Animalia
- Phylum: Arthropoda
- Class: Insecta
- Order: Lepidoptera
- Family: Cossidae
- Genus: Simplicivalva
- Species: S. charmion

Binomial name
- Simplicivalva charmion (Schaus, 1934)

Synonyms
- Hemipectrona charmion Schaus, 1934; Schausiania charmion

Species of moth

Simplicivalva charmion is a moth in the family Cossidae. It is found in Brazil.
