= Magulacra albimacula =

Scientific classification
- Domain: Eukaryota
- Kingdom: Animalia
- Phylum: Arthropoda
- Class: Insecta
- Order: Lepidoptera
- Family: Cossidae
- Genus: Magulacra
- Species: M. albimacula

Binomial name
- Magulacra albimacula (Dognin, 1923)

Synonyms
- Hemipectrona albimacula Dognin, 1923; Schausiania albimacula

Species of moth

Magulacra albimacula is a moth in the family Cossidae. It is found in Bolivia.
