= Simplicivalva striolata =

Scientific classification
- Domain: Eukaryota
- Kingdom: Animalia
- Phylum: Arthropoda
- Class: Insecta
- Order: Lepidoptera
- Family: Cossidae
- Genus: Simplicivalva
- Species: S. striolata

Binomial name
- Simplicivalva striolata (Schaus, 1901)

Synonyms
- Costria striolata Schaus, 1901

Species of moth

Simplicivalva striolata is a moth in the family Cossidae. It is found in Brazil.
