= Biocellata praeclara =

Scientific classification
- Kingdom: Animalia
- Phylum: Arthropoda
- Class: Insecta
- Order: Lepidoptera
- Family: Cossidae
- Genus: Biocellata
- Species: B. praeclara

Binomial name
- Biocellata praeclara (Schaus, 1892)

Synonyms
- Cossula praeclara Schaus, 1892

Species of moth

Biocellata praeclara is a moth in the family Cossidae. It is found in Brazil.
