= Simplicivalva =

Scientific classification
- Kingdom: Animalia
- Phylum: Arthropoda
- Clade: Pancrustacea
- Class: Insecta
- Order: Lepidoptera
- Family: Cossidae
- Genus: Simplicivalva; Davis, Gentili-Poole & Mitter, 2008

Moth genus in family Cossidae

Simplicivalva is a genus of moths in the family Cossidae.

== Species ==
- Simplicivalva ampliophilobia
- Simplicivalva charmion
- Simplicivalva corita
- Simplicivalva eberti
- Simplicivalva interrogationis
- Simplicivalva marmorata
- Simplicivalva morgani
- Simplicivalva philobia
- Simplicivalva poecilosema
- Simplicivalva striolata
