= Magulacra niveogrisea =

Scientific classification
- Kingdom: Animalia
- Phylum: Arthropoda
- Clade: Pancrustacea
- Class: Insecta
- Order: Lepidoptera
- Family: Cossidae
- Genus: Magulacra
- Species: M. niveogrisea

Binomial name
- Magulacra niveogrisea (Schaus, 1905)

Synonyms
- Hemipecten niveogrisea Schaus, 1905; Cossula niveogrisea (Schaus, 1905); Schausiania niveogrisea Schaus, 1905

Species of moth

Magulacra niveogrisea is a moth in the family Cossidae. It is widely distributed in Latin America: it occurs from Mexico (Chiapas) to Brazil and Argentina. Its type locality is Saint-Laurent-du-Maroni (French Guinea).

The forewing length is 8–20 mm (0.31–0.79 in) in males and 17 mm (0.67 in) in females.
