= Spinulata julius =

Scientific classification
- Kingdom: Animalia
- Phylum: Arthropoda
- Clade: Pancrustacea
- Class: Insecta
- Order: Lepidoptera
- Family: Cossidae
- Genus: Spinulata
- Species: S. julius

Binomial name
- Spinulata julius (Schaus, 1921)

Synonyms
- Hemipectrona julius Schaus, 1921; Schausiania julius

Species of moth

Spinulata julius is a moth in the family Cossidae. It is found in Brazil.

It has a wingspan of about 50 mm. The forewings have a greyish brown shading on the costal and outer margins. The inner margin is shaded with whitish ochre. There is a large dark cinnamon brown spot medially in the cell, inwardly edged by a black line. The hindwings are white.
