= Biocellata bistellata =

Scientific classification
- Kingdom: Animalia
- Phylum: Arthropoda
- Class: Insecta
- Order: Lepidoptera
- Family: Cossidae
- Genus: Biocellata
- Species: B. bistellata

Binomial name
- Biocellata bistellata (Dognin, 1910)

Synonyms
- Cossula bistellata Dognin, 1910

Species of moth

Biocellata bistellata is a moth in the family Cossidae. It is found in French Guiana.
