= Biocellata rotundipuncta =

Scientific classification
- Kingdom: Animalia
- Phylum: Arthropoda
- Class: Insecta
- Order: Lepidoptera
- Family: Cossidae
- Genus: Biocellata
- Species: B. rotundipuncta

Binomial name
- Biocellata rotundipuncta (Schaus, 1905)

Synonyms
- Hemipecten rotundipuncta Schaus, 1905; Schausiania rotundipuncta

Species of moth

Biocellata rotundipuncta is a moth in the family Cossidae. It is found in French Guiana.
