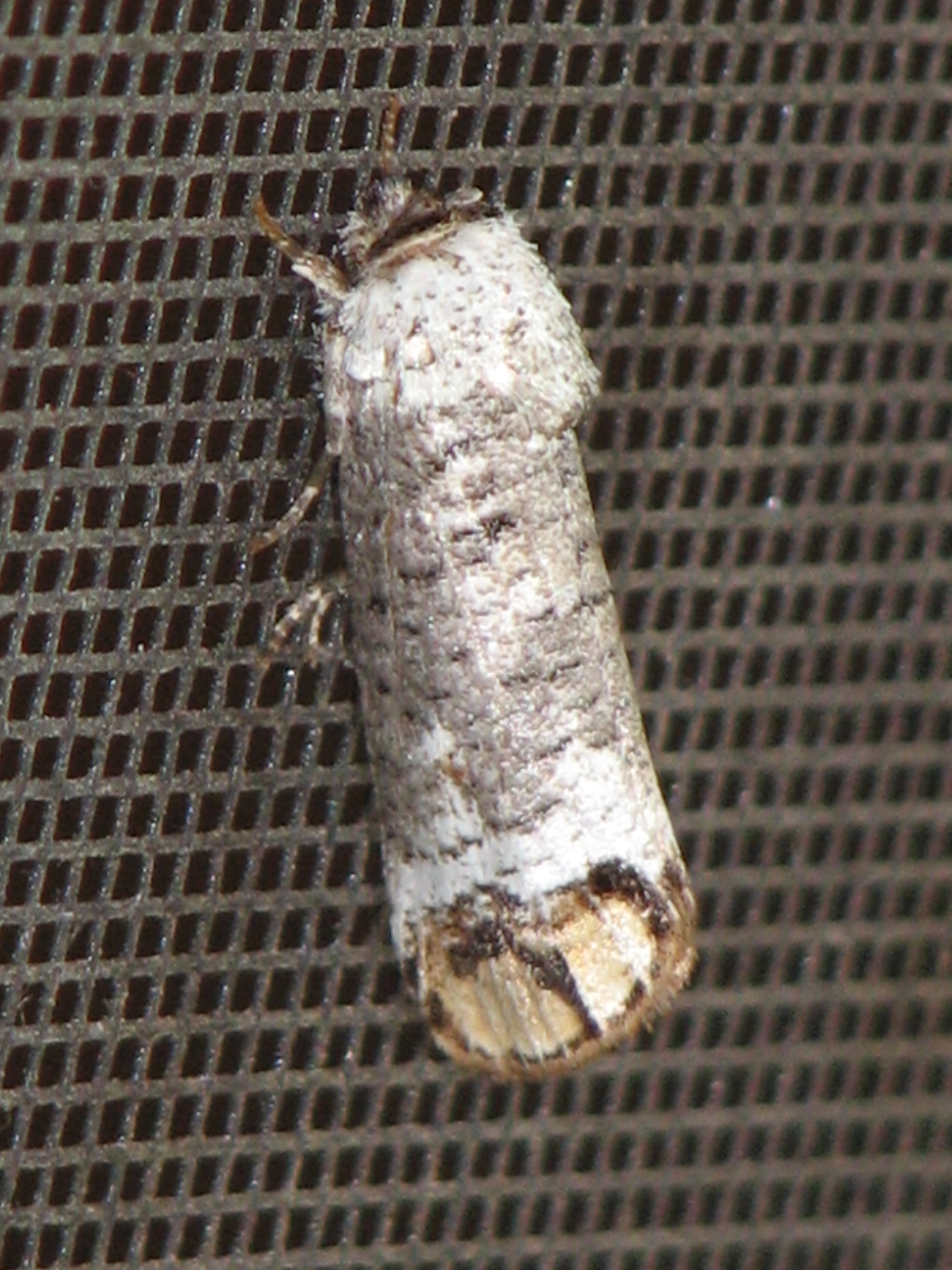
- Cossula magnifica

Scientific classification
- Domain: Eukaryota
- Kingdom: Animalia
- Phylum: Arthropoda
- Class: Insecta
- Order: Lepidoptera
- Family: Cossidae
- Subfamily: Cossulinae

= Cossulinae =

Subfamily of moths

The Cossulinae are a subfamily of the family Cossidae (carpenter or goat moths).

== Genera ==
- Austrocossus Gentili, 1986
- Biocellata Davis, Gentili-Poole & Mitter, 2008
- Cossula Bailey, 1882
- Magulacra Davis, Gentili-Poole & Mitter, 2008
- Simplicivalva Davis, Gentili-Poole & Mitter, 2008
- Spinulata Davis, Gentili-Poole & Mitter, 2008

== Former genera ==
- Catopta Staudinger, 1899
- Lamellocossus Daniel, 1956
- Parahypopta Daniel, 1961
