= Herman Strecker =

American entomologist

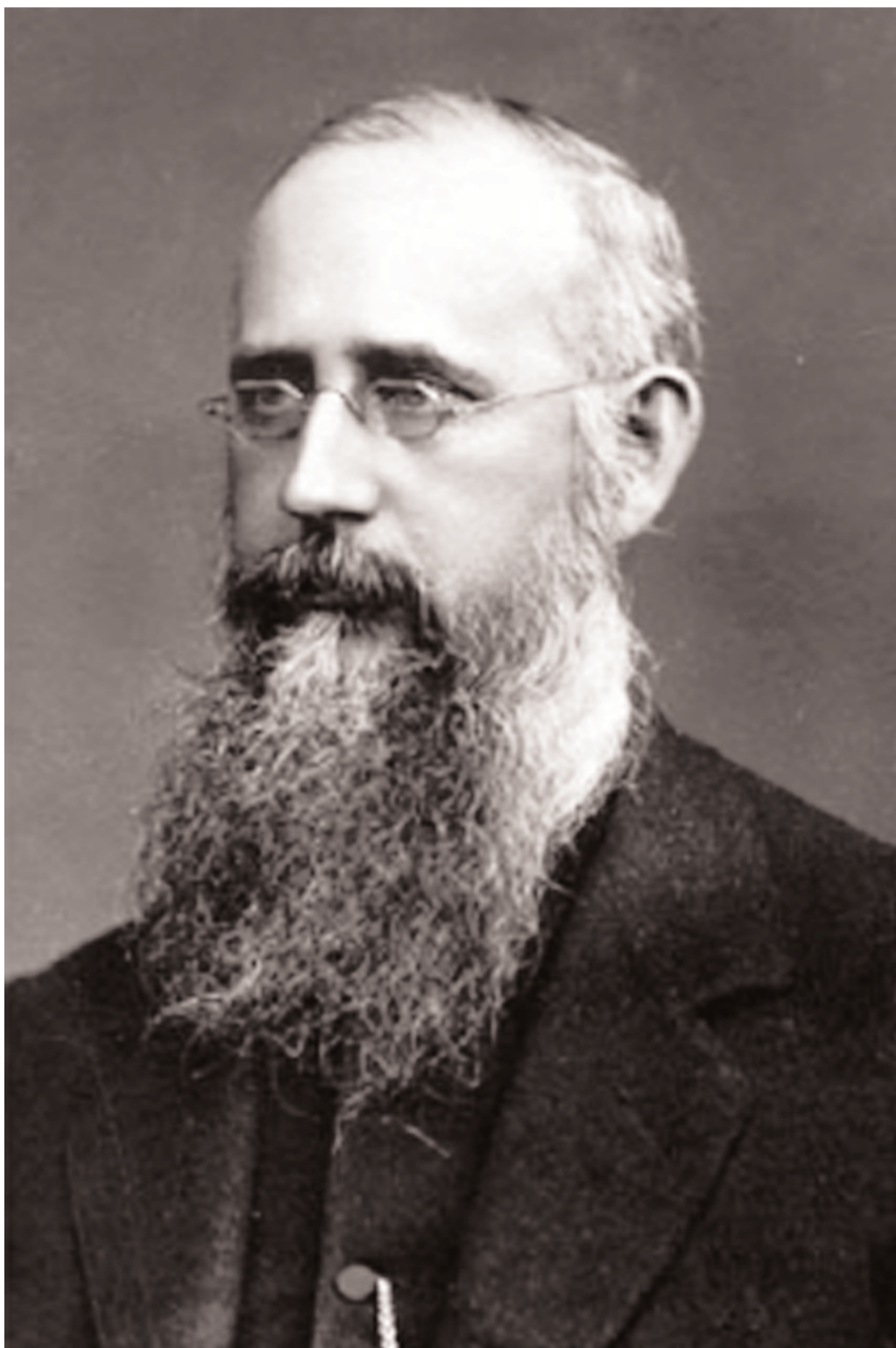
Herman Strecker

Ferdinand Heinrich Herman Strecker (March 24, 1836 – November 30, 1901) was an American entomologist specialising in butterflies and moths (Lepidoptera).

Strecker was born in Philadelphia to Ferdinand and Anna (née Kern) who had emigrated from Germany. His father had trained as a sculptor in Europe, settled in Reading where he made and traded in marble sculptures. The young Strecker showed great aptitude for this trade, starting to work at twelve years, and succeeding his father. But sculpture was not lucrative enough and young Strecker also made tombstones and trained in architecture. On his mother's side he had naturalists as well as artists who inspired him when he was young.

As a young man, Strecker frequented the library of the Academy of Natural Sciences of Philadelphia where he studied natural history and more particularly the butterflies. A polyglot, he traveled extensively, in particular in the Caribbean, Mexico and Central America where he studied Aztec monuments and collected butterflies.

After forty years of collecting, he had assembled a collection of 200,000 specimens of butterflies and moths coming from all the corners of the world, including 300 new species and around 150 subspecies. His collection occupied a whole floor of his house in Reading. At the time of his death in 1901, Strecker's collection was the largest and most important private collection of butterflies and moths in the New World. It was purchased in 1908 by the Field Museum of Natural History of Chicago.

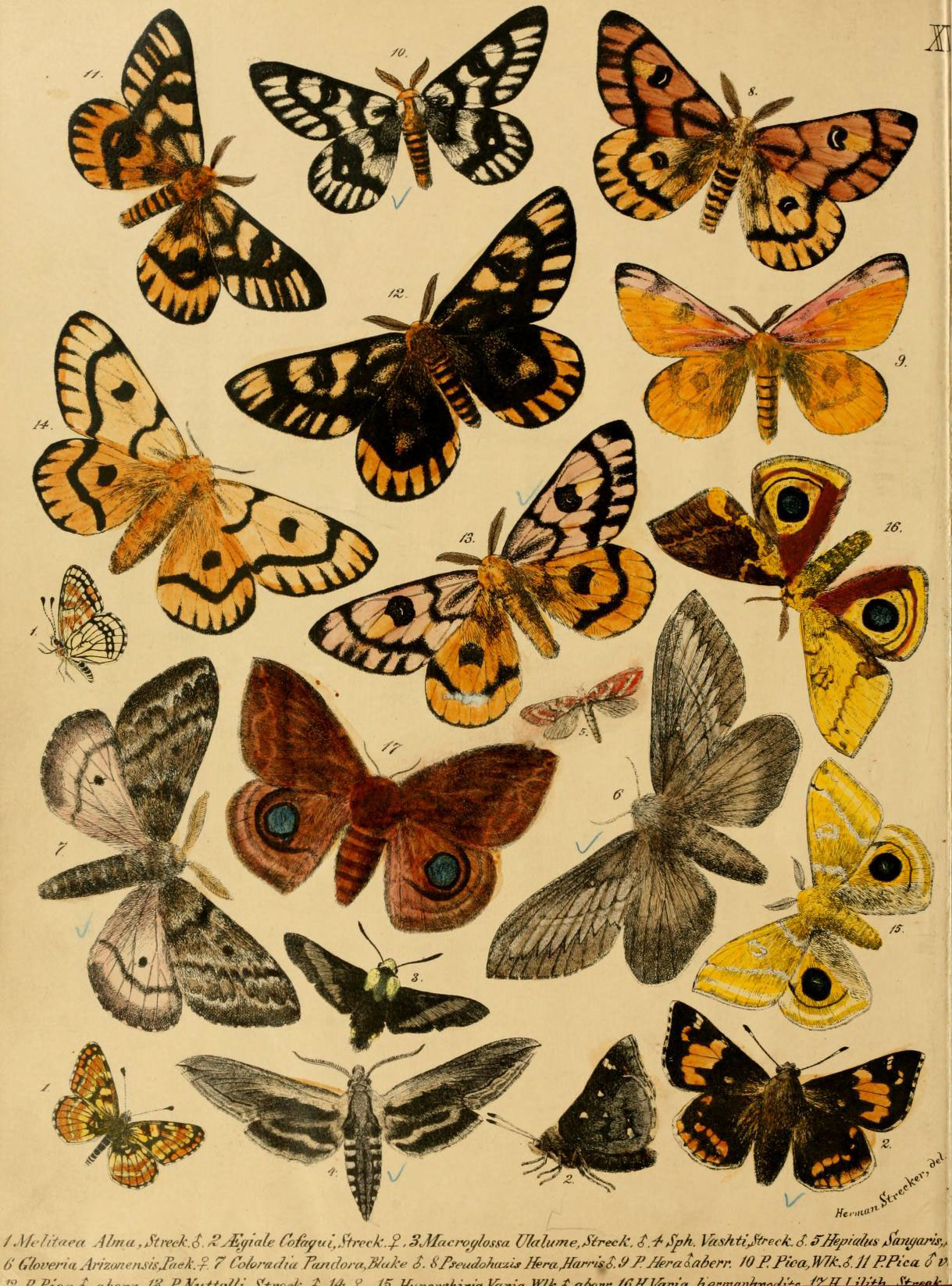
Illustration by Strecker

In spite of his limited resources, he published, from 1872 to 1878, Lepidoptera Rhopaloceres and Heteroceres, Indigenous and Exotic, with Descriptions and Colored Illustrations. Richly illustrated by himself, with the assistance of colorist Emily L. Morton, the work identifies 251 new species. A second edition was published as a single volume in 1879. In 1878, he published Butterflies and Moths of North America which also details methods for the preparation, breeding, collection, the classification and the conservation of the butterflies. In addition to building his own collection, Strecker was a dealer of butterfly and moth specimens.

In 1890, he received an honorary doctorate from Franklin and Marshall College.

== Works ==
- Strecker, H., 1872-1878. Lepidoptera, Rhopaloceres and Heteroceras, Indigenous and Exotic; with Descriptions and Colored Illustrations. Reading, PA, Owen's Steam Book and Job Printing Office, 143 p., XV plates.
- Strecker, H., 1879. Lepidoptera, Rhopaloceres and Heteroceras, Indigenous and Exotic; with Descriptions and Colored Illustrations. Second edition. Reading, PA, Author, 143 p., XV plates
