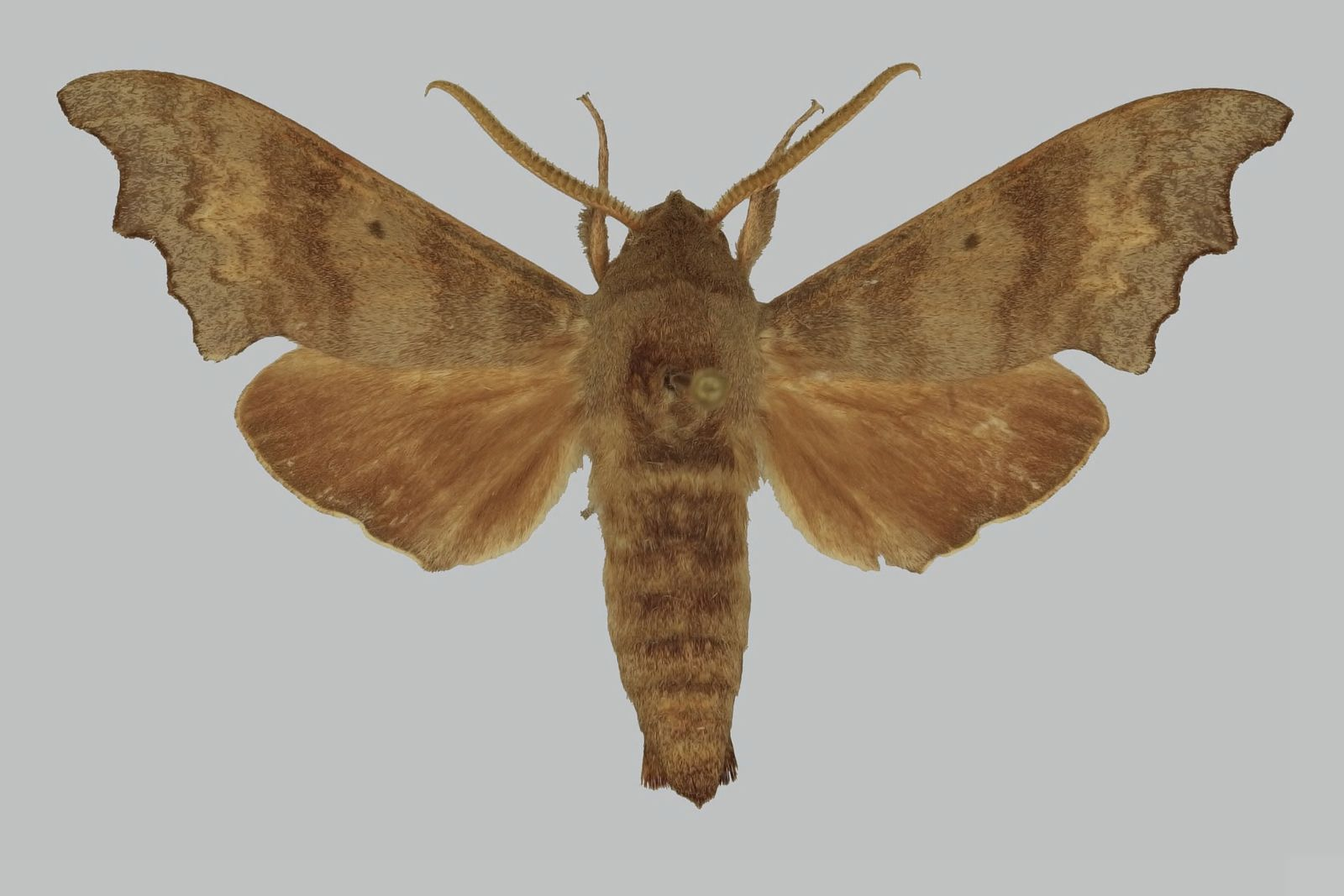
- Male

Scientific classification
- Domain: Eukaryota
- Kingdom: Animalia
- Phylum: Arthropoda
- Class: Insecta
- Order: Lepidoptera
- Family: Sphingidae
- Genus: Cypa
- Species: C. claggi

Binomial name
- Cypa claggi Clark, 1935

= Cypa claggi =

Species of moth

Cypa claggi is a species of moth of the family Sphingidae. It is known from the Philippines.

The length of the forewings is about 25 mm. The pattern is similar to Cypa ferruginea and the colour to Cypa decolor decolor. The forewing upperside is much lighter than the underside, but the hindwing upperside is much darker than the underside.
