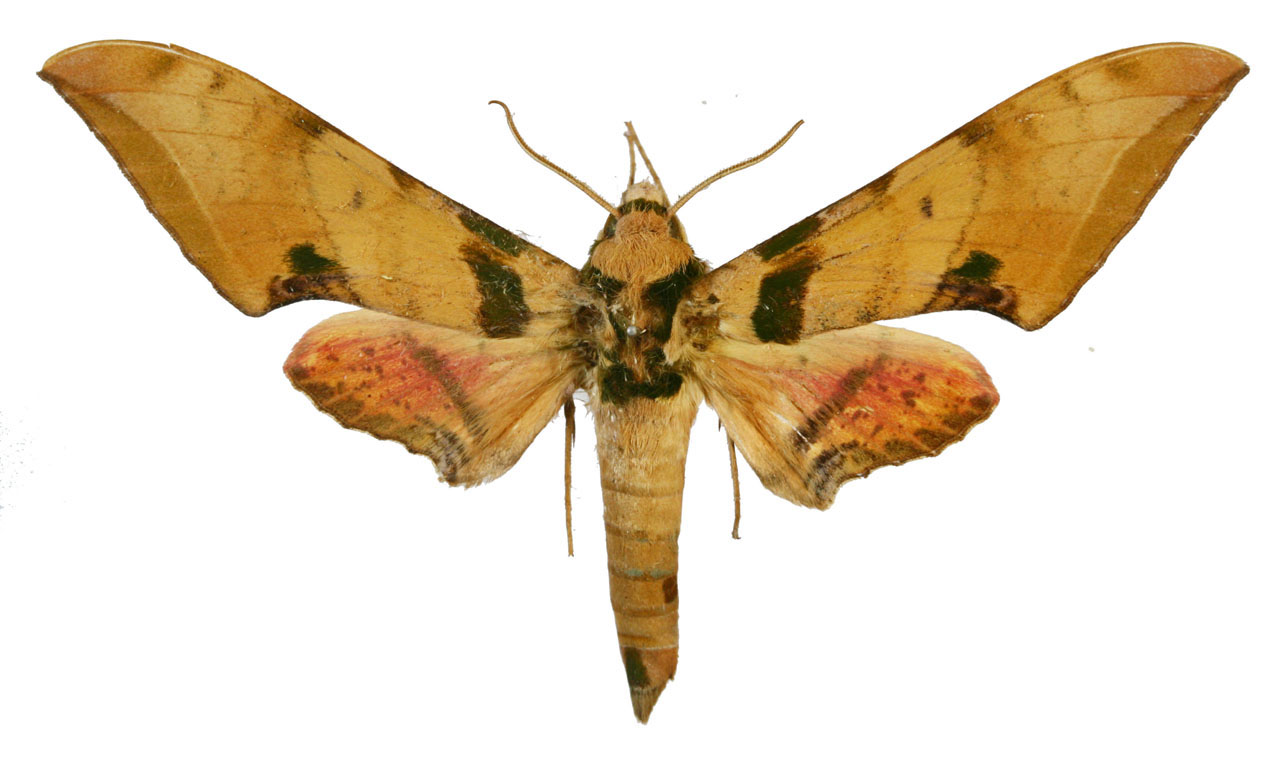
- Ambulyx kuangtungensis f. adhemariusa male upperside

Scientific classification
- Kingdom: Animalia
- Phylum: Arthropoda
- Class: Insecta
- Order: Lepidoptera
- Family: Sphingidae
- Genus: Ambulyx
- Species: A. adhemariusa

Binomial name
- Ambulyx adhemariusa Eitschberger, Bergmann & Hauenstein, 2006

= Ambulyx adhemariusa =

Species of moth

Ambulyx adhemariusa is a species of moth in the family Sphingidae. It was described by Ulf Eitschberger, Andreas Bergmann and Armin Hauenstein in 2006. It is known from Sichuan in China. A. adhemariusa may be a form of Ambulyx kuangtungensis.
