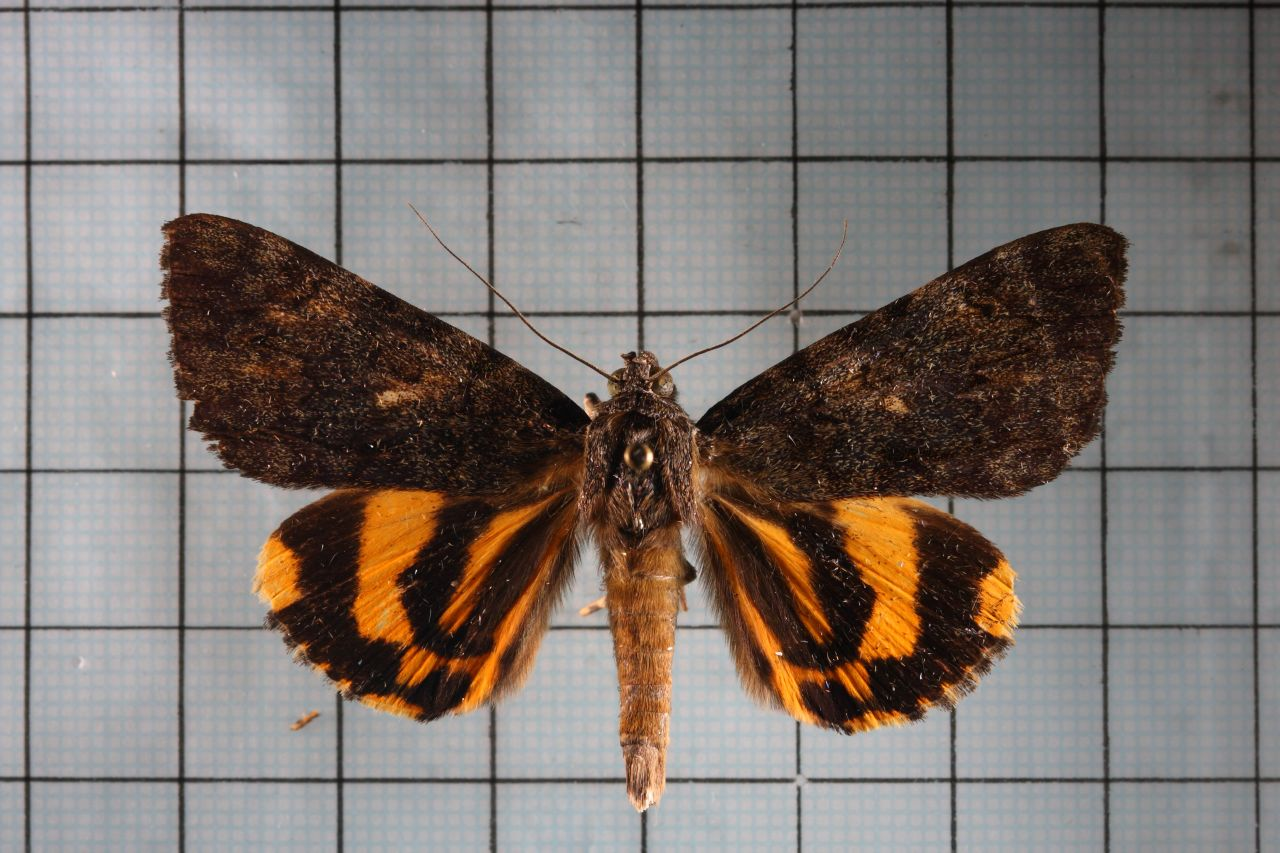

Scientific classification
- Domain: Eukaryota
- Kingdom: Animalia
- Phylum: Arthropoda
- Class: Insecta
- Order: Lepidoptera
- Superfamily: Noctuoidea
- Family: Erebidae
- Genus: Catocala
- Species: C. kuangtungensis

Binomial name
- Catocala kuangtungensis Mell, 1931

= Catocala kuangtungensis =

Species of moth

Catocala kuangtungensis is a moth of the family Erebidae. It is found in China (Guangdong, Hunan, Guizhou, Jangxi, Shaanxi, Sichuan) and Japan (Honshu, Shikoku, Kyushu, Yakushima).

The wingspan is about 63 mm.

== Subspecies ==
- Catocala kuangtungensis kuangtungensis
- Catocala kuangtungensis sugii Ishizuka, 2002
- Catocala kuangtungensis chohien Ishizuka, 2002 (Shaanxi, Sichuan)

Catocala dejeani is sometimes also included in the present species.
