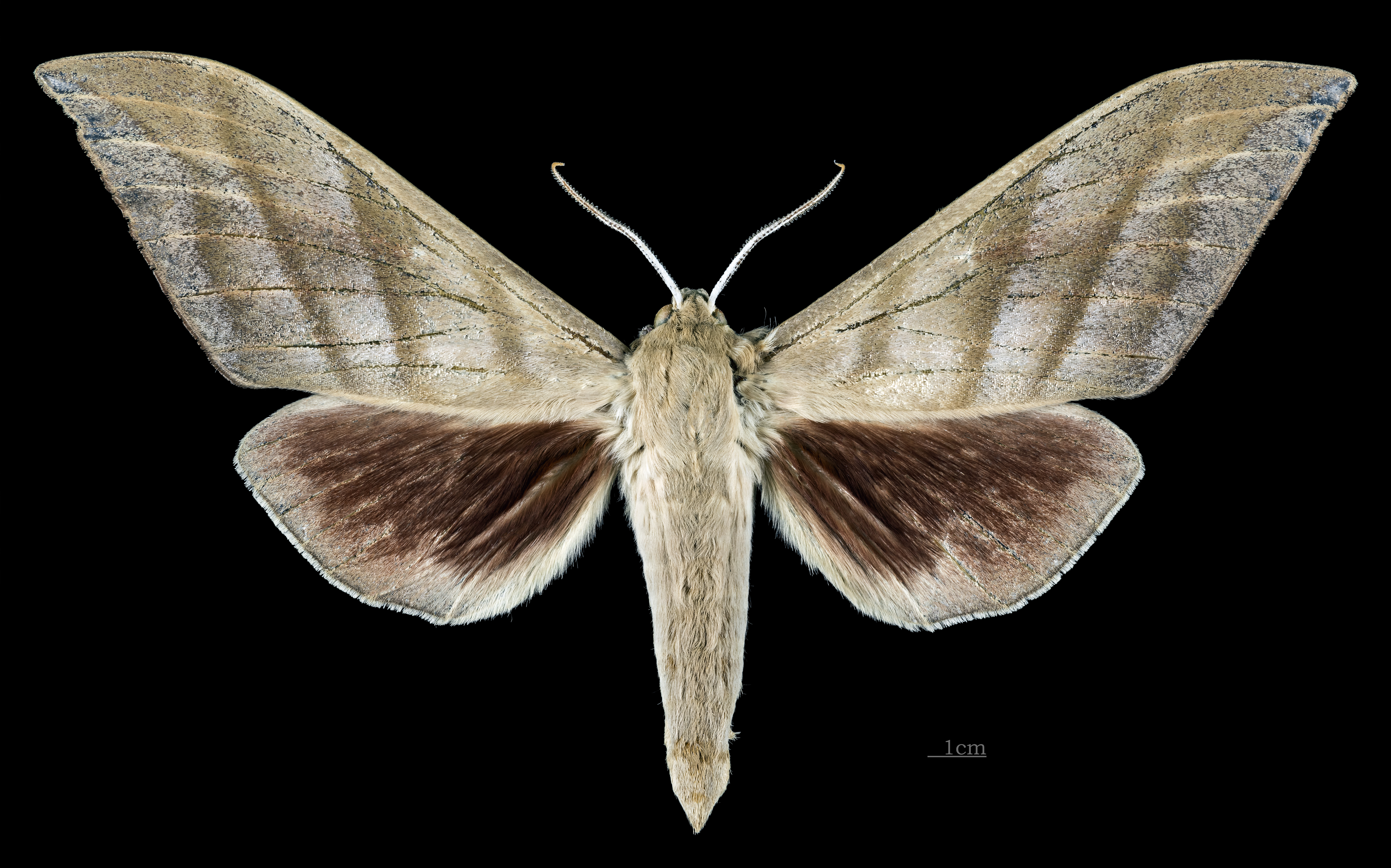
- Rhodambulyx schnitzleri

Scientific classification
- Domain: Eukaryota
- Kingdom: Animalia
- Phylum: Arthropoda
- Class: Insecta
- Order: Lepidoptera
- Family: Sphingidae
- Tribe: Smerinthini
- Genus: Rhodambulyx; Mell, 1939

= Rhodambulyx =

Genus of moths

Rhodambulyx is a genus of moths in the family Sphingidae first described by Rudolf Mell in 1939.

== Species ==
- Rhodambulyx davidi Mell, 1939
- Rhodambulyx hainanensis Brechlin, 2001
- Rhodambulyx schnitzleri Cadiou, 1990
