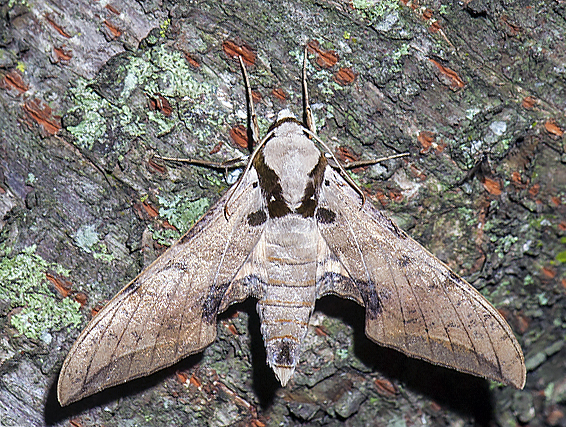

Scientific classification
- Kingdom: Animalia
- Phylum: Arthropoda
- Class: Insecta
- Order: Lepidoptera
- Family: Sphingidae
- Genus: Ambulyx
- Species: A. kuangtungensis

Binomial name
- Ambulyx kuangtungensis (Mell, 1922)

Synonyms
- Oxyambulyx kuangtungensis Mell, 1922; Oxyambulyx takasago Okano, 1964; Oxyambulyx kuangtungensis formosana Clark, 1936; Oxyambulyx kuangtungensis hoenei Mell, 1937; Oxyambulyx kuangtungensis melli Gehlen, 1942

= Ambulyx kuangtungensis =

Species of moth

Ambulyx kuangtungensis is a species of moth of the family Sphingidae first described by Rudolf Mell in 1922.

== Distribution ==
It is known from southern China, northern Thailand, northern Vietnam and Taiwan.

== Description ==
The wingspan is 65–80 mm.

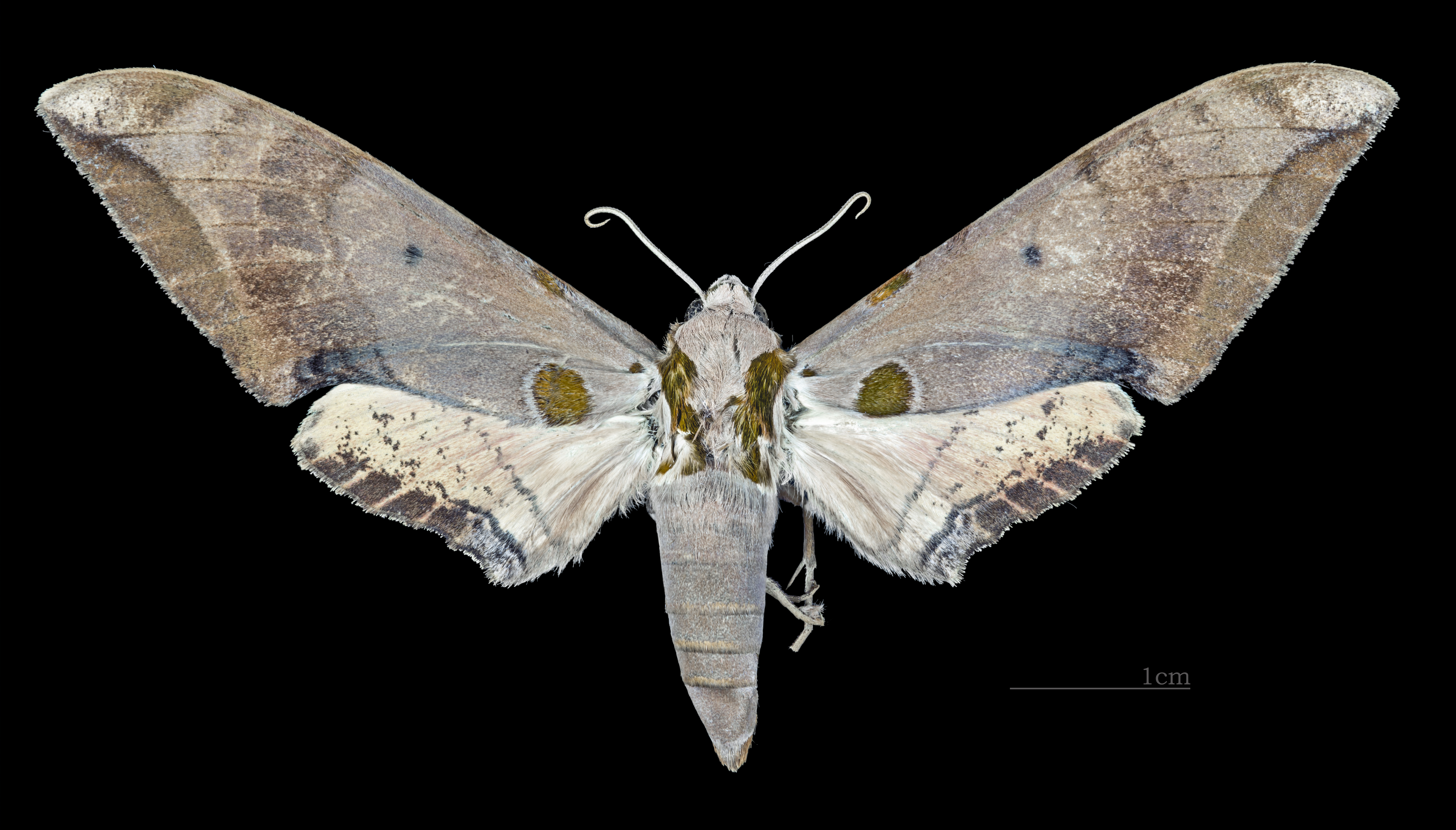
Female dorsal view

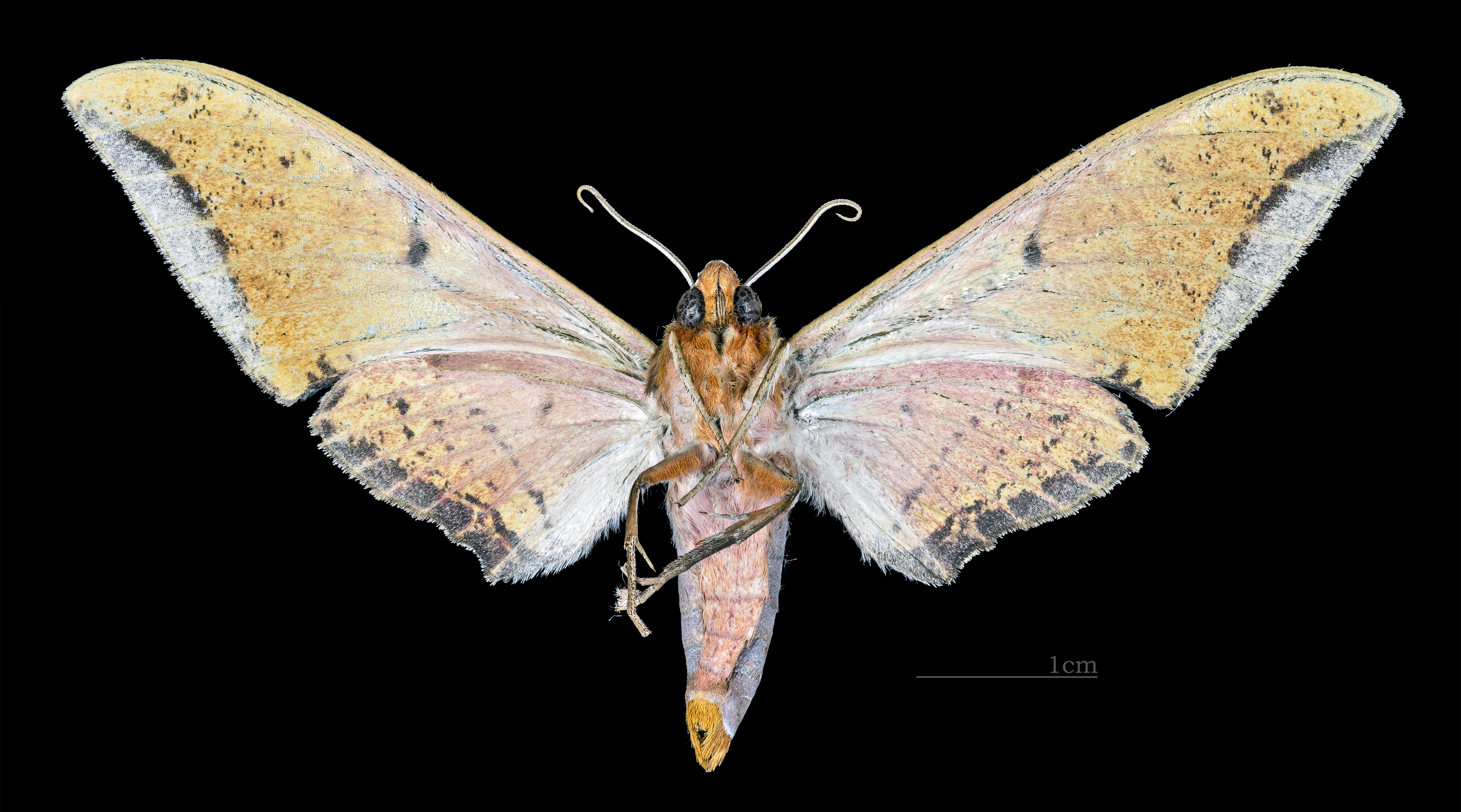
Female ventral view

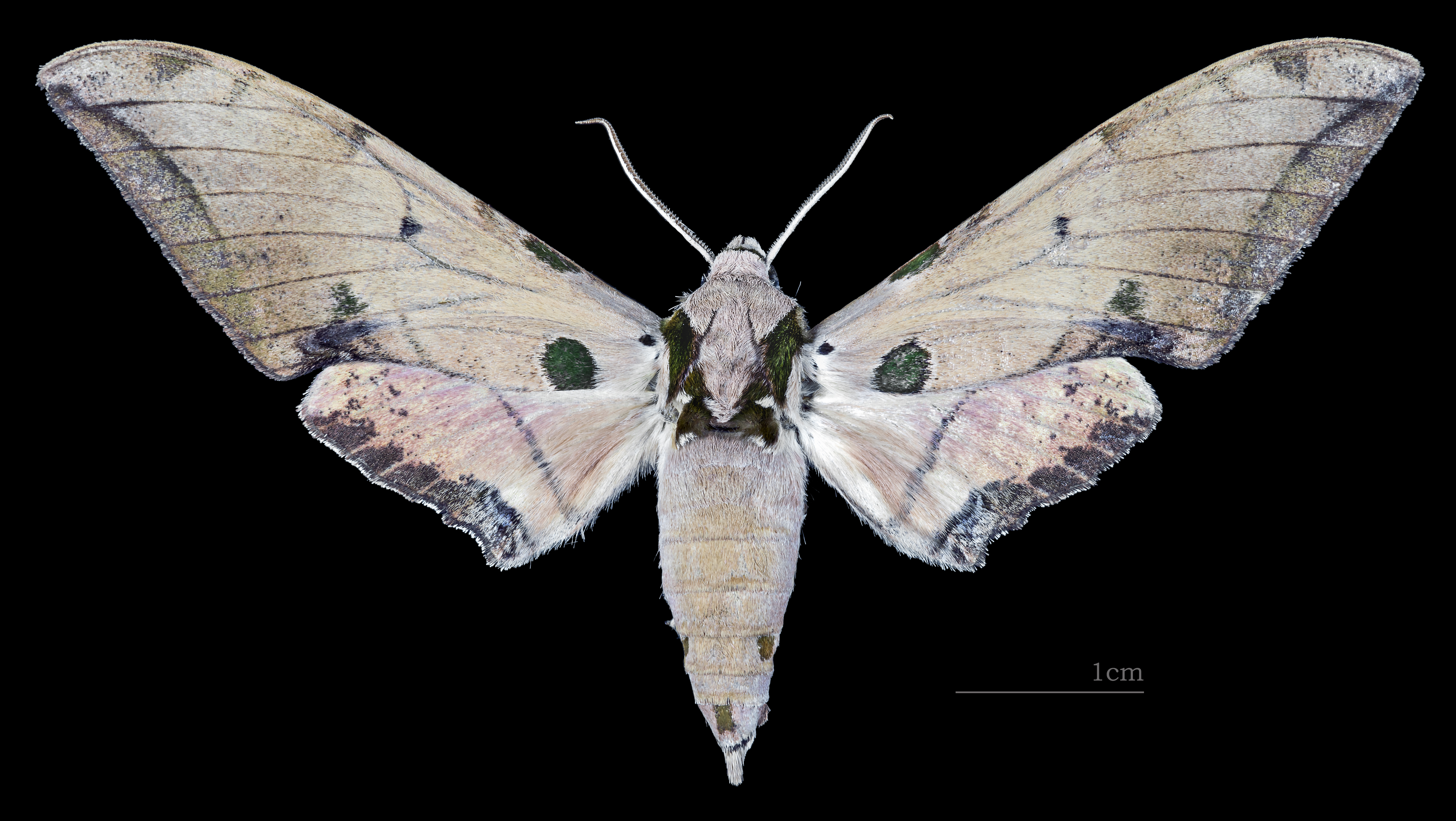
Male dorsal view

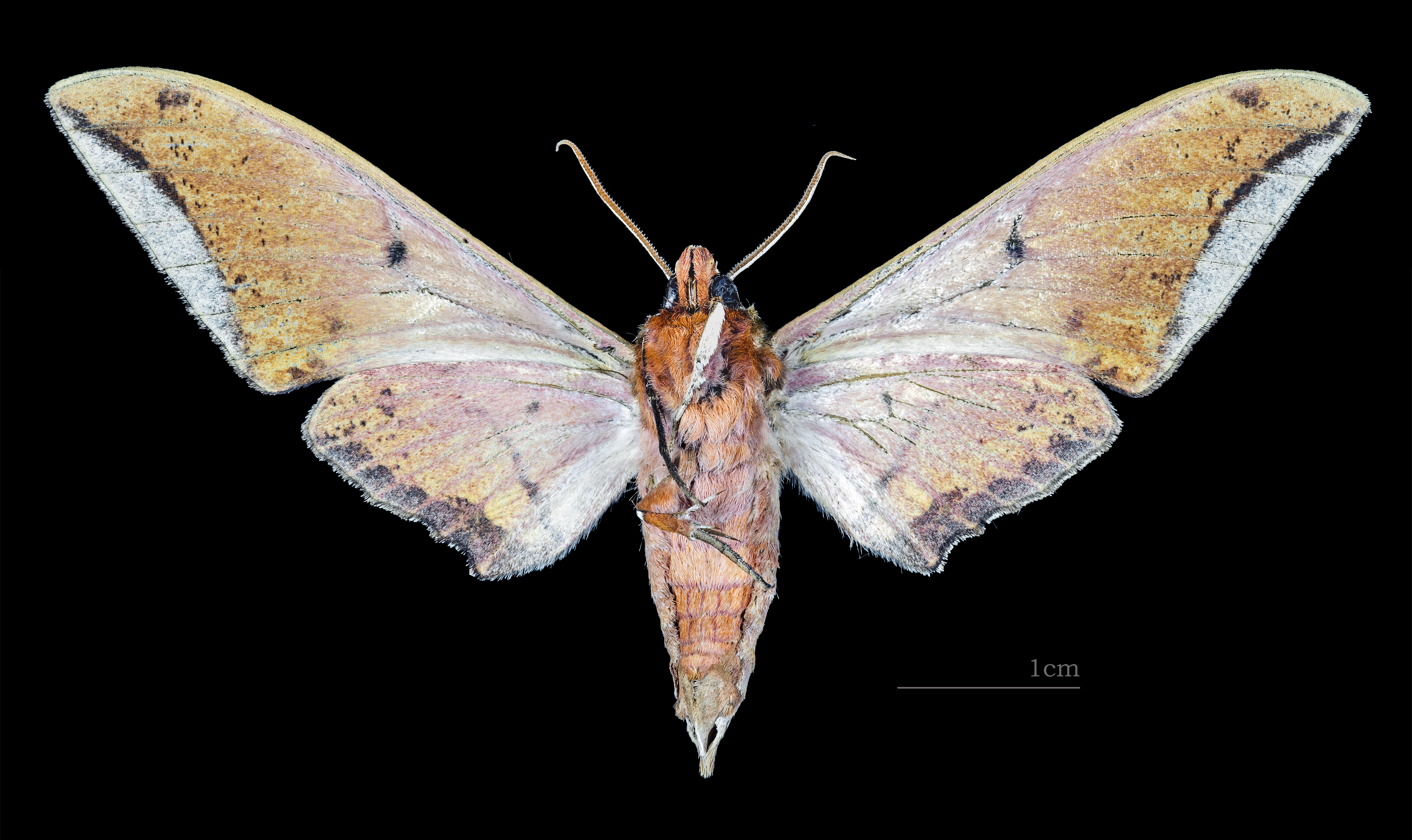
Male ventral view

== Biology ==
The larvae have been recorded feeding on Choerospondias axillaris in Guangdong.
