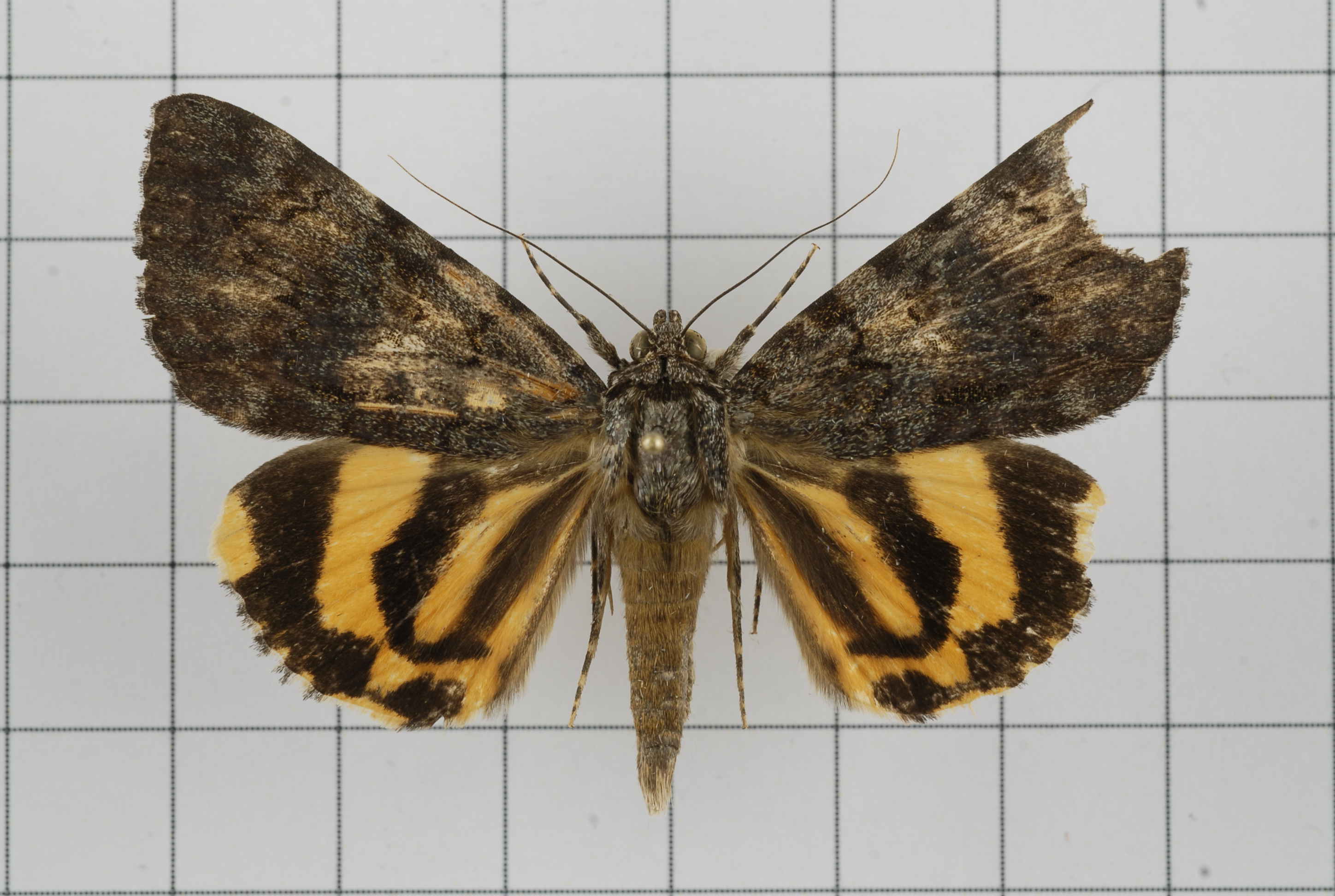

Scientific classification
- Domain: Eukaryota
- Kingdom: Animalia
- Phylum: Arthropoda
- Class: Insecta
- Order: Lepidoptera
- Superfamily: Noctuoidea
- Family: Erebidae
- Genus: Catocala
- Species: C. dejeani

Binomial name
- Catocala dejeani Mell, 1936

= Catocala dejeani =

Species of moth

Catocala dejeani is a moth of the family Erebidae first described by Rudolf Mell in 1936. It is found in China (Situan, Shaanxi, Guangxi) and Taiwan.

Some authors consider it a subspecies of Catocala kuangtungensis.

The wingspan is about 67 mm.

== Subspecies ==
- Catocala dejeani dejeani
- Catocala dejeani chogohtoku Ishizuka, 2002 (China)
- Catocala dejeani owadai Ishizuka, 2002 (Taiwan)
