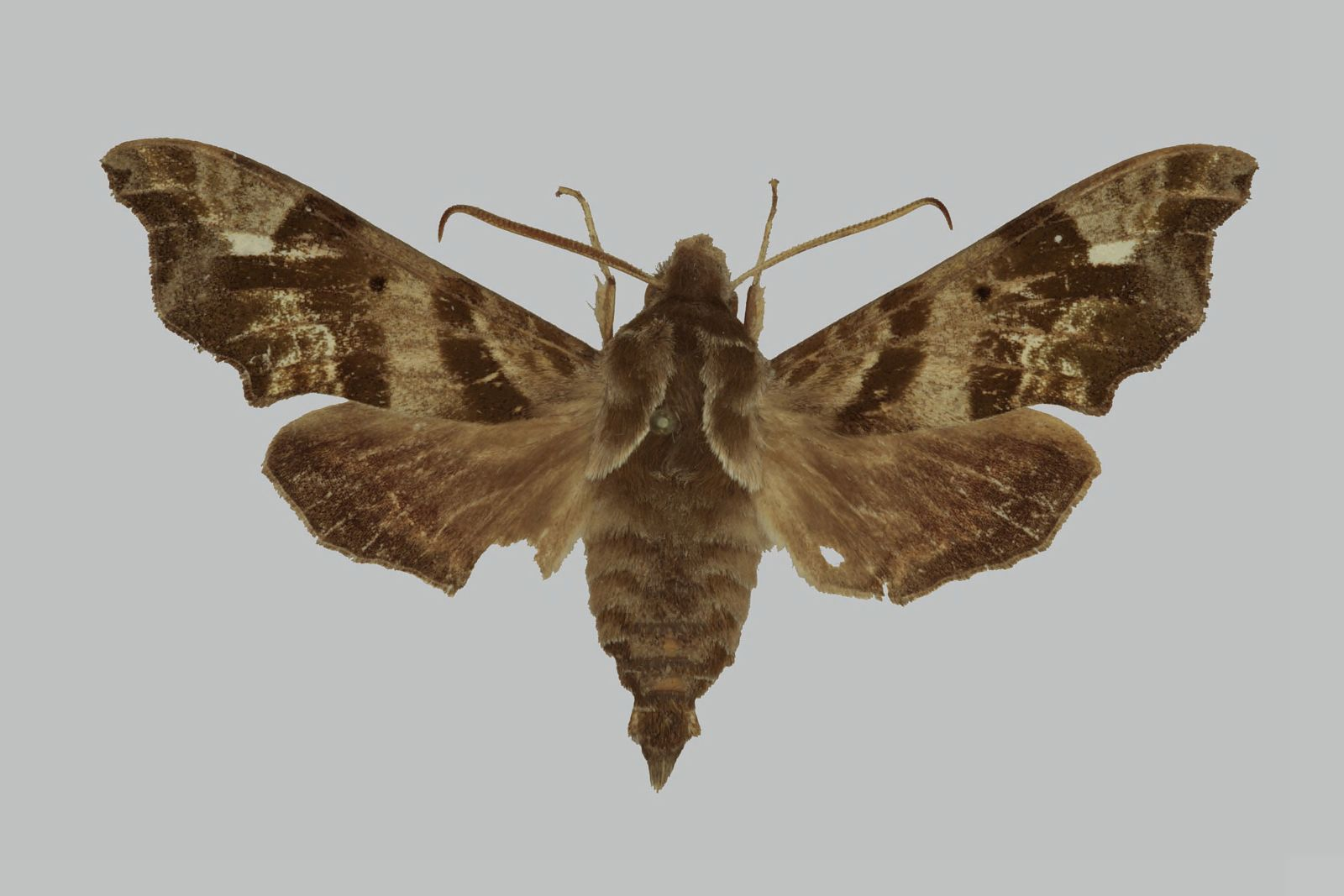
- Male

Scientific classification
- Kingdom: Animalia
- Phylum: Arthropoda
- Class: Insecta
- Order: Lepidoptera
- Family: Sphingidae
- Genus: Dahira
- Species: D. hoenei

Binomial name
- Dahira hoenei (Mell, 1937)

Synonyms
- Philodila hoenei Mell, 1937; Acosmeryx hoenei; Acosmeryx cacthschild Chu & Wang, 1980

= Dahira hoenei =

Species of moth

Dahira hoenei is a moth of the family Sphingidae. It was described by Rudolf Mell in 1937. It is known from Shaanxi and Sichuan in China.
