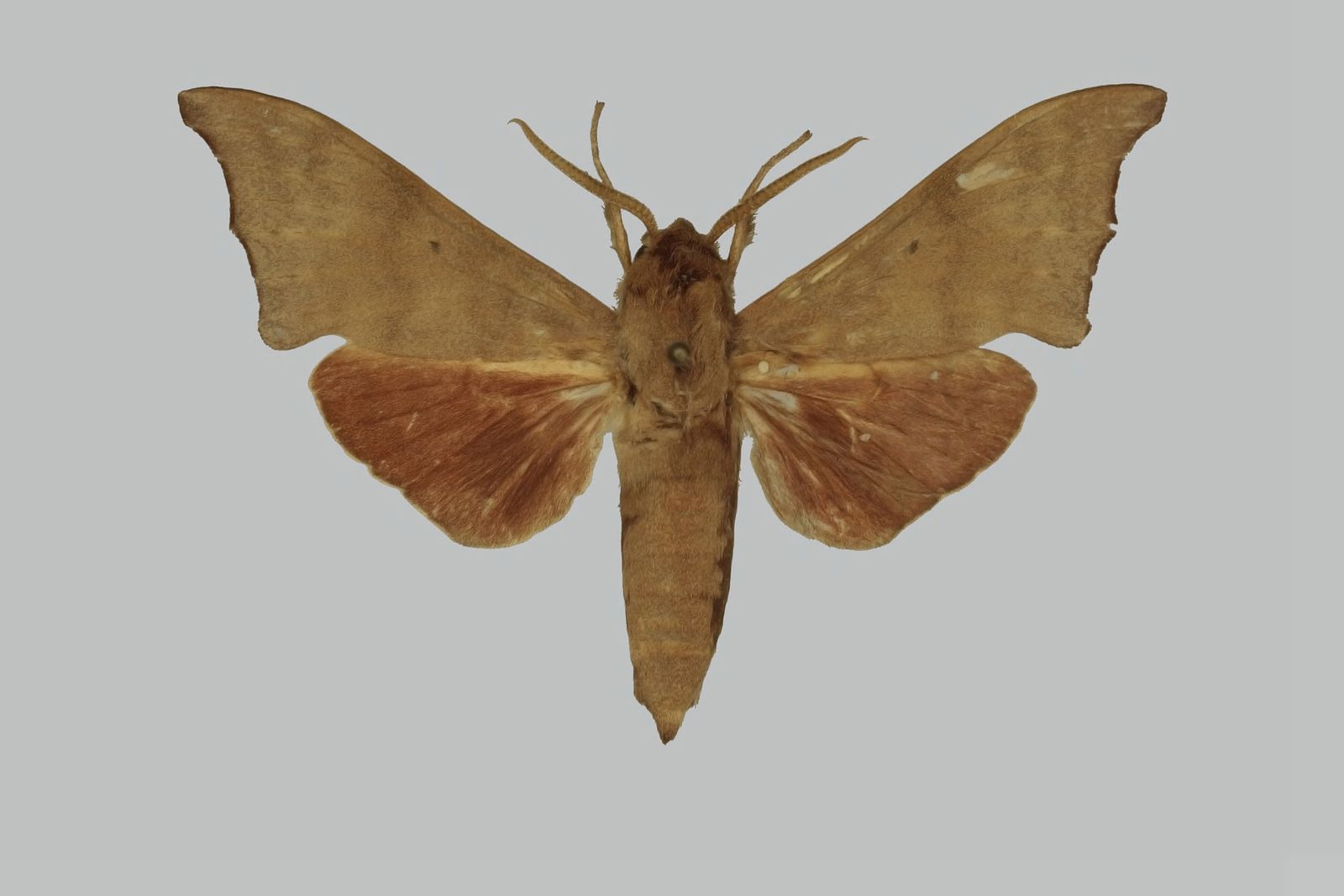
- Male

Scientific classification
- Kingdom: Animalia
- Phylum: Arthropoda
- Clade: Pancrustacea
- Class: Insecta
- Order: Lepidoptera
- Family: Sphingidae
- Genus: Cypa
- Species: C. kitchingi

Binomial name
- Cypa kitchingi Cadiou, 1997

= Cypa kitchingi =

Species of moth

Cypa kitchingi is a species of moth of the family Sphingidae. It is known from Sulawesi.
