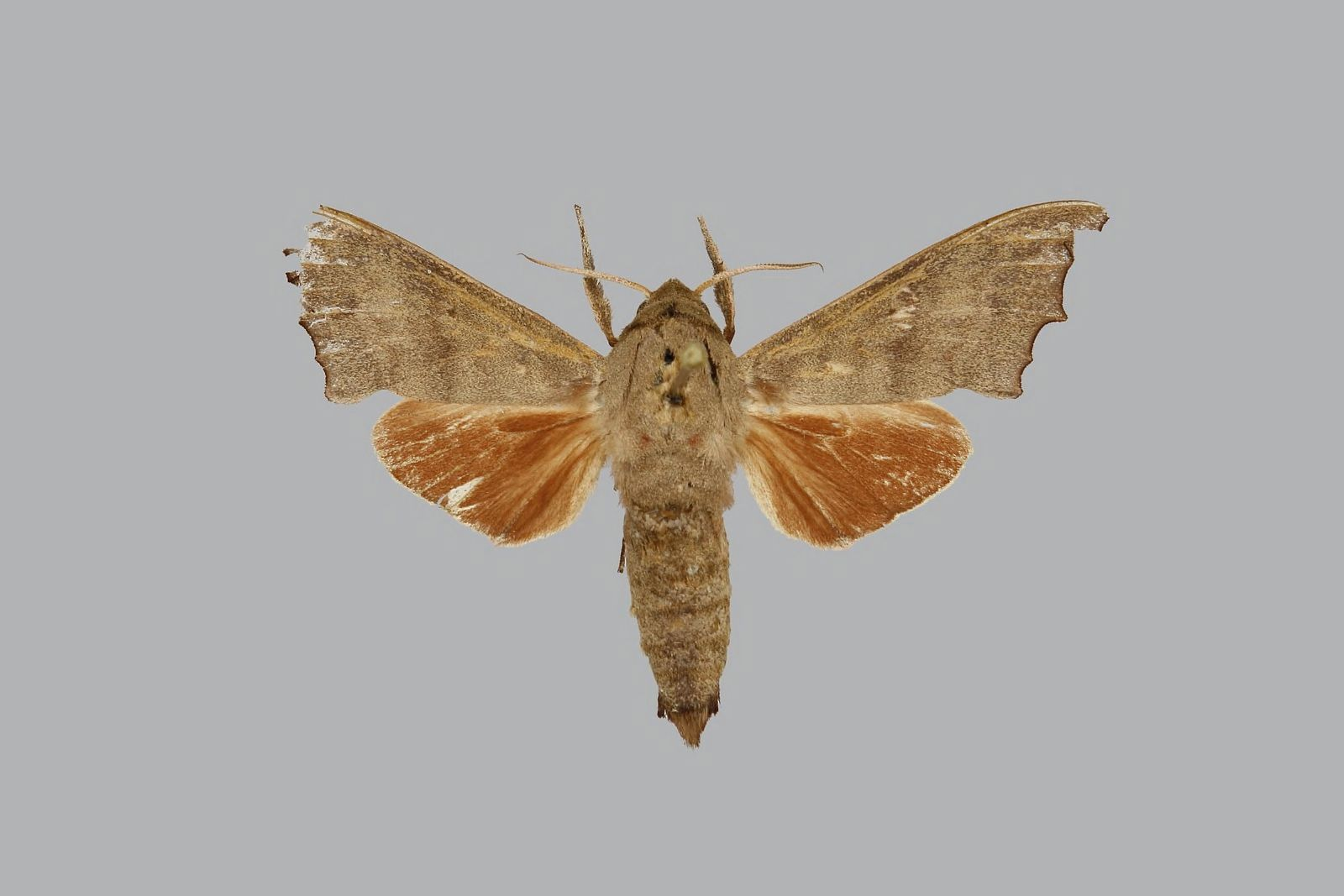
- Male

Scientific classification
- Domain: Eukaryota
- Kingdom: Animalia
- Phylum: Arthropoda
- Class: Insecta
- Order: Lepidoptera
- Family: Sphingidae
- Genus: Cypa
- Species: C. duponti

Binomial name
- Cypa duponti Roepke, 1941

= Cypa duponti =

Species of moth

Cypa duponti is a species of moth of the family Sphingidae. It is known from Thailand, Sumatra, Java and Borneo.
