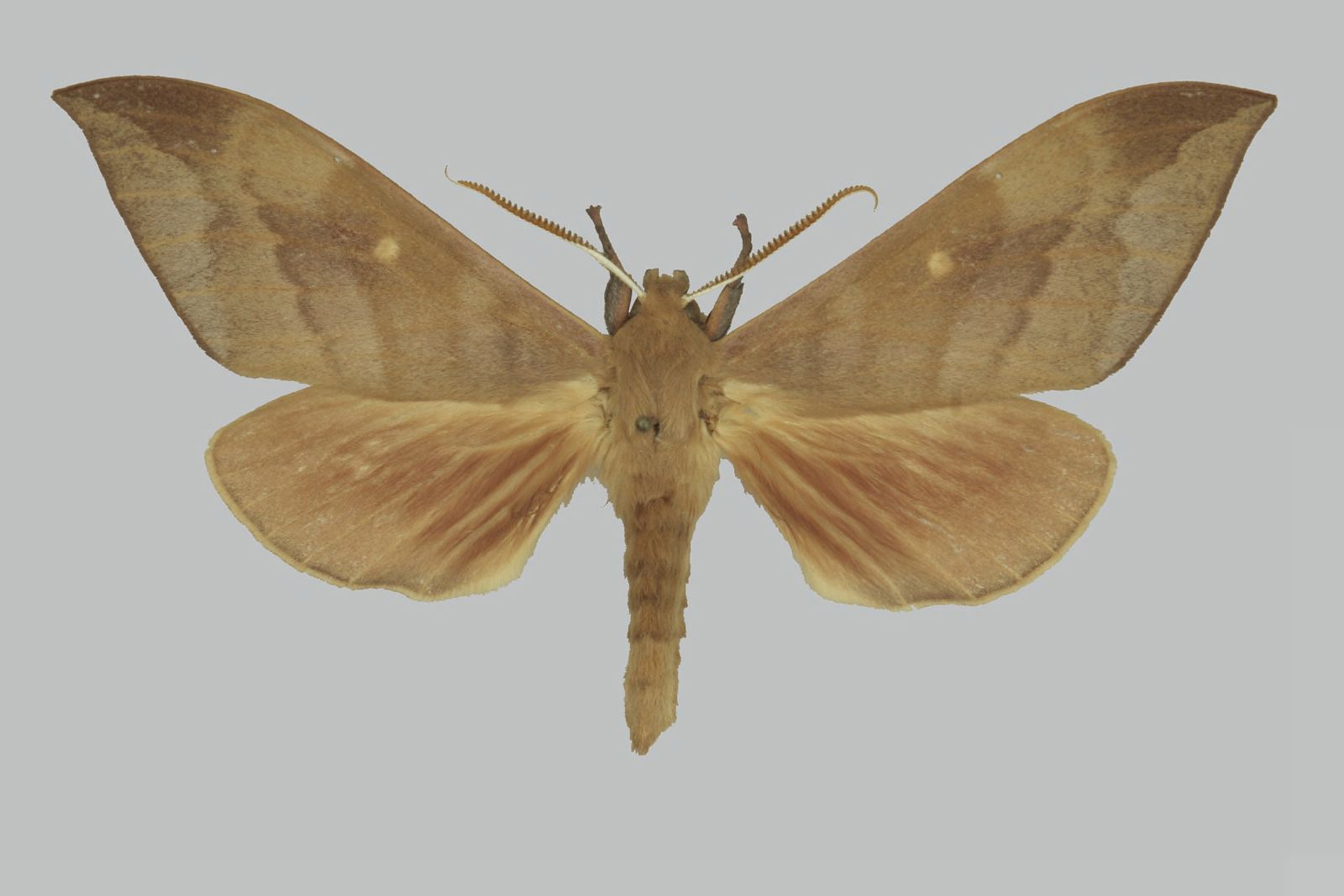

Scientific classification
- Kingdom: Animalia
- Phylum: Arthropoda
- Class: Insecta
- Order: Lepidoptera
- Family: Sphingidae
- Genus: Rhodambulyx
- Species: R. davidi

Binomial name
- Rhodambulyx davidi Mell, 1939

= Rhodambulyx davidi =

Species of moth

Rhodambulyx davidi is a species of moth of the family Sphingidae. It is known from the mountains of southern China, where it is found at altitudes between 1,200 and 2,300 meters.
