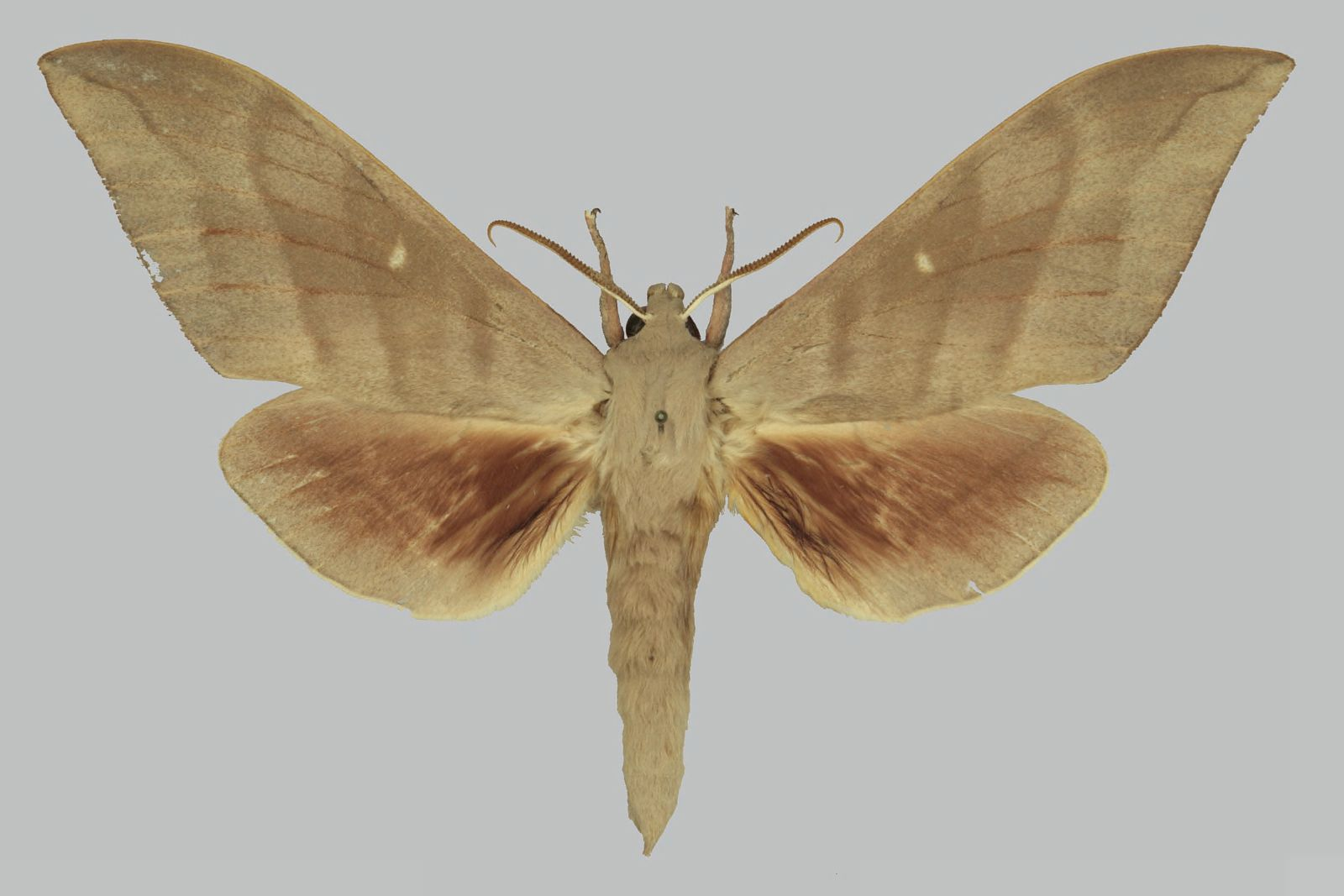

Scientific classification
- Kingdom: Animalia
- Phylum: Arthropoda
- Class: Insecta
- Order: Lepidoptera
- Family: Sphingidae
- Genus: Rhodambulyx
- Species: R. hainanensis

Binomial name
- Rhodambulyx hainanensis Brechlin, 2001

= Rhodambulyx hainanensis =

Species of moth

Rhodambulyx hainanensis is a species of moth of the family Sphingidae. It is known from the mountains of Hainan Island in China, where it is found at altitudes of about 1,500 meters.
