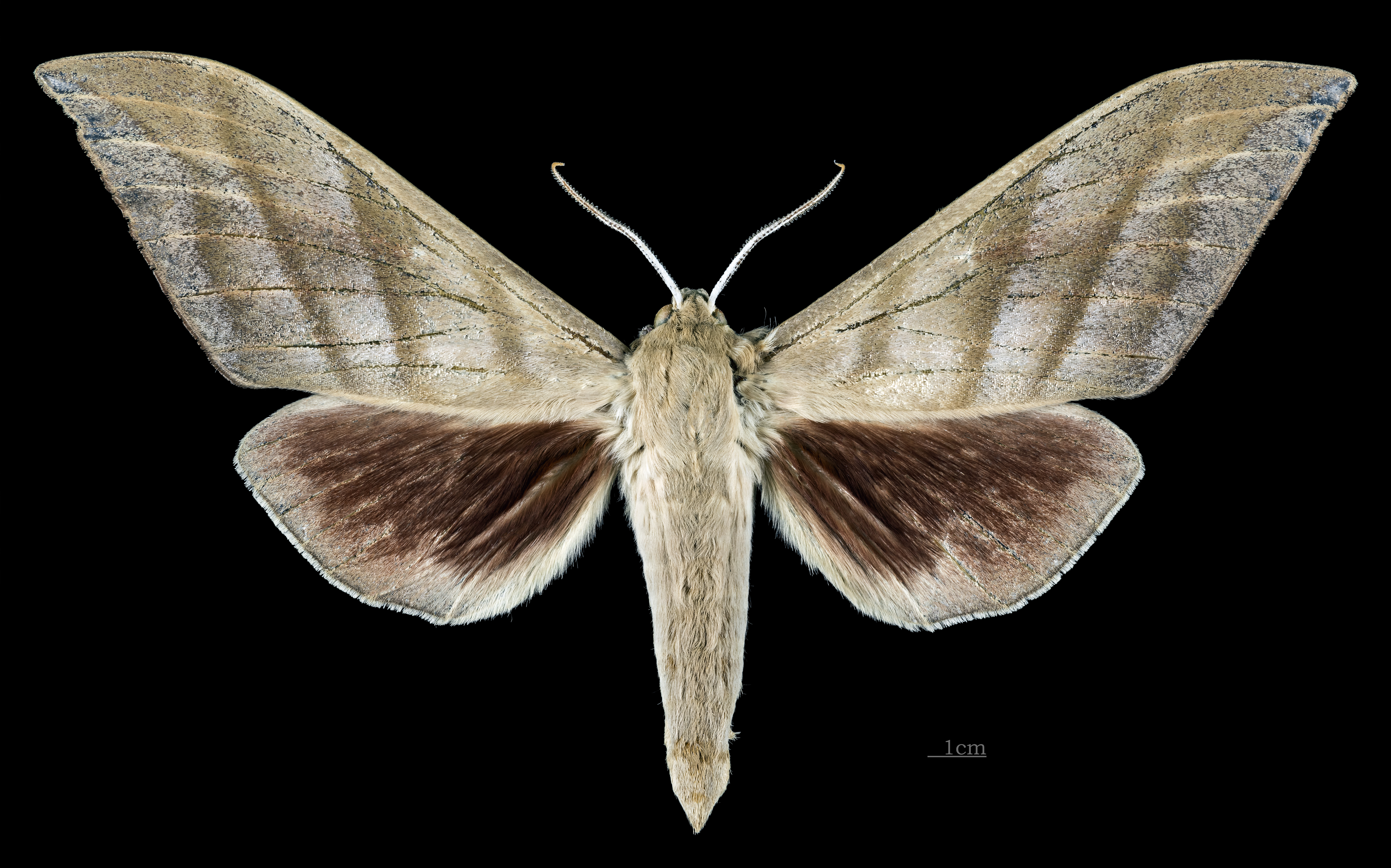
- Male dorsal
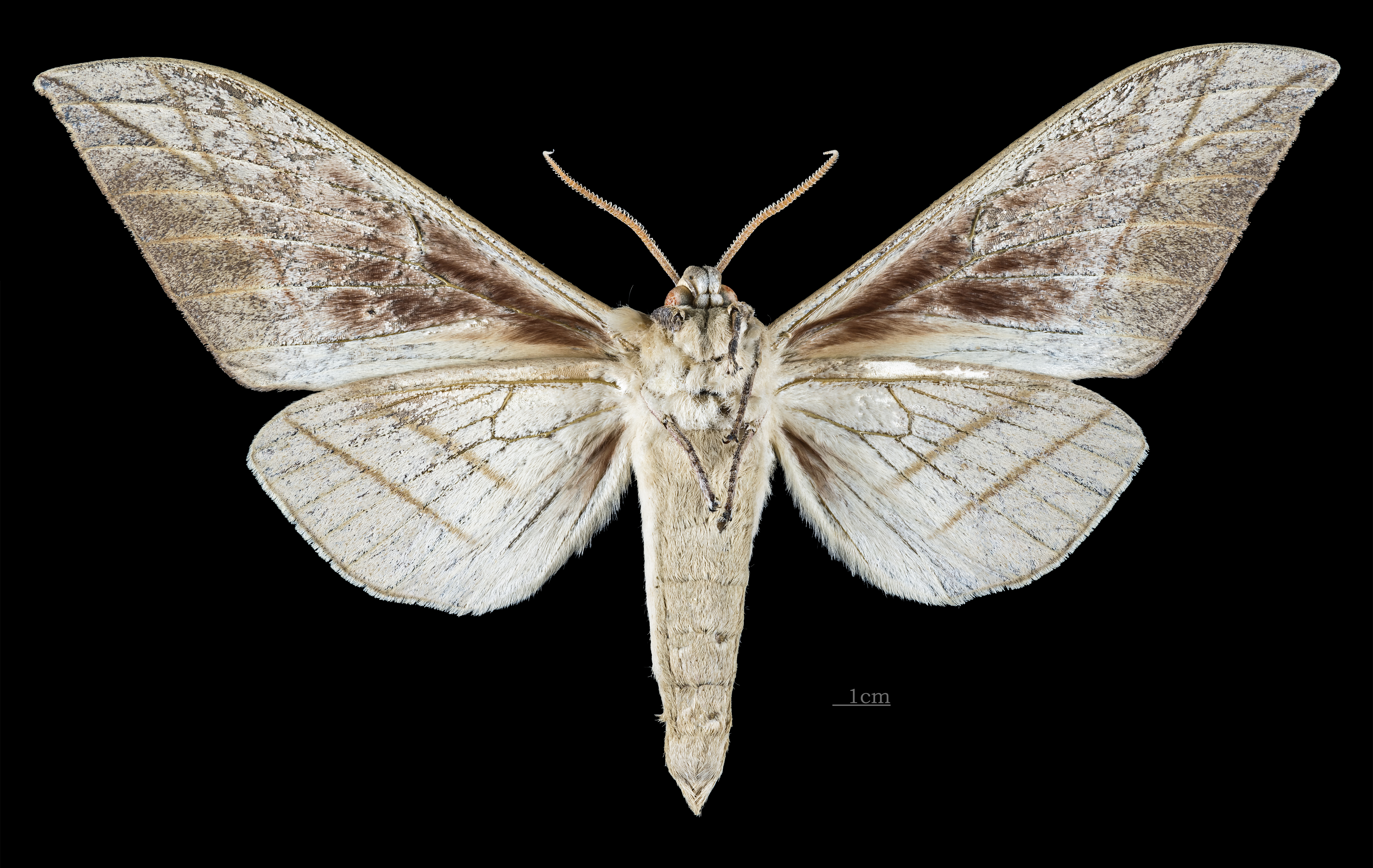
- Male ventral

Scientific classification
- Kingdom: Animalia
- Phylum: Arthropoda
- Clade: Pancrustacea
- Class: Insecta
- Order: Lepidoptera
- Family: Sphingidae
- Genus: Rhodambulyx
- Species: R. schnitzleri

Binomial name
- Rhodambulyx schnitzleri Cadiou, 1990

= Rhodambulyx schnitzleri =

Species of moth

Rhodambulyx schnitzleri is a species of moth of the family Sphingidae. It is known from western Yunnan in China and northern Thailand.
