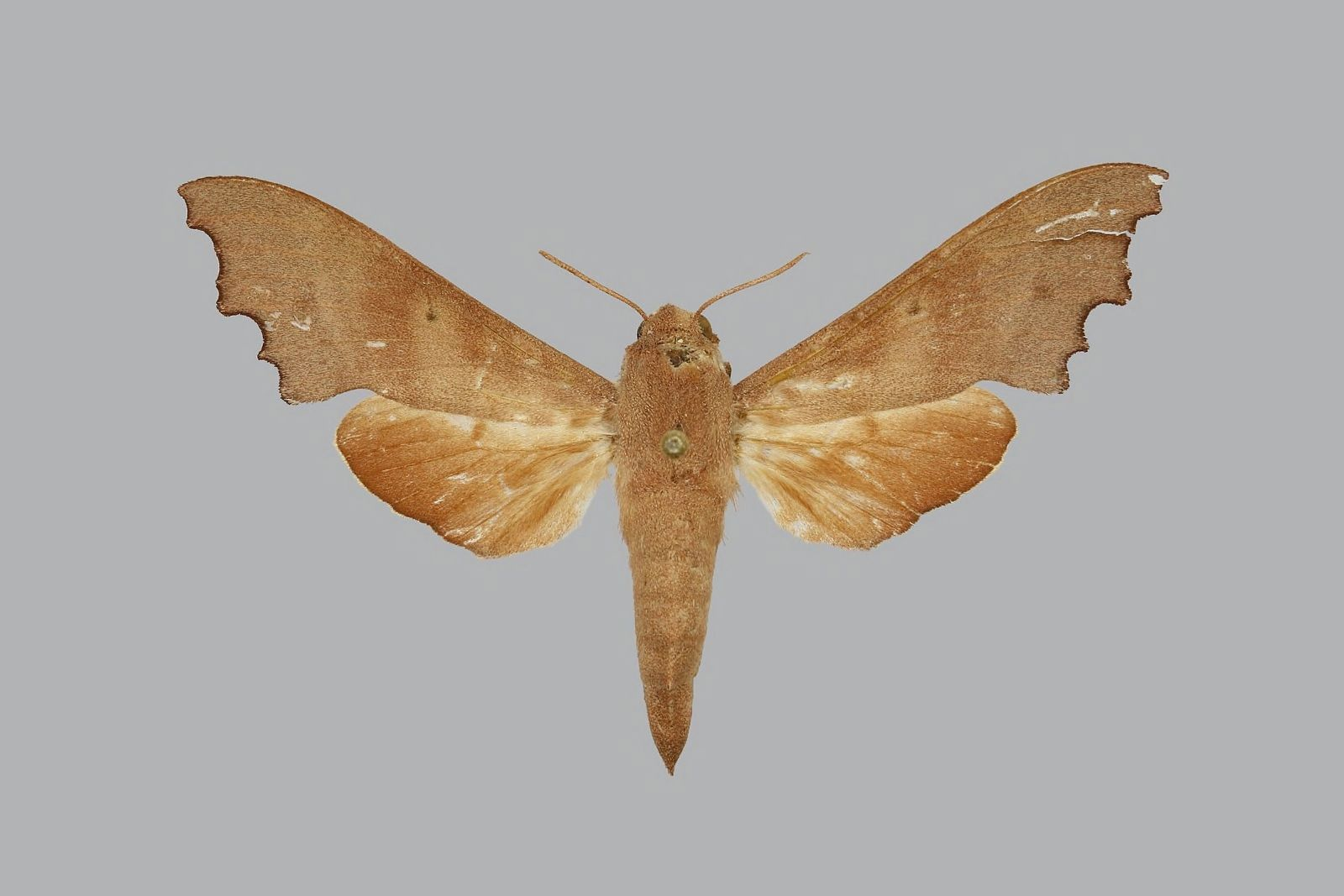
- Female

Scientific classification
- Kingdom: Animalia
- Phylum: Arthropoda
- Class: Insecta
- Order: Lepidoptera
- Family: Sphingidae
- Genus: Cypa
- Species: C. latericia

Binomial name
- Cypa latericia Inoue, 1991

= Cypa latericia =

Species of moth

Cypa latericia is a species of moth of the family Sphingidae. It is known from Thailand and Burma.
