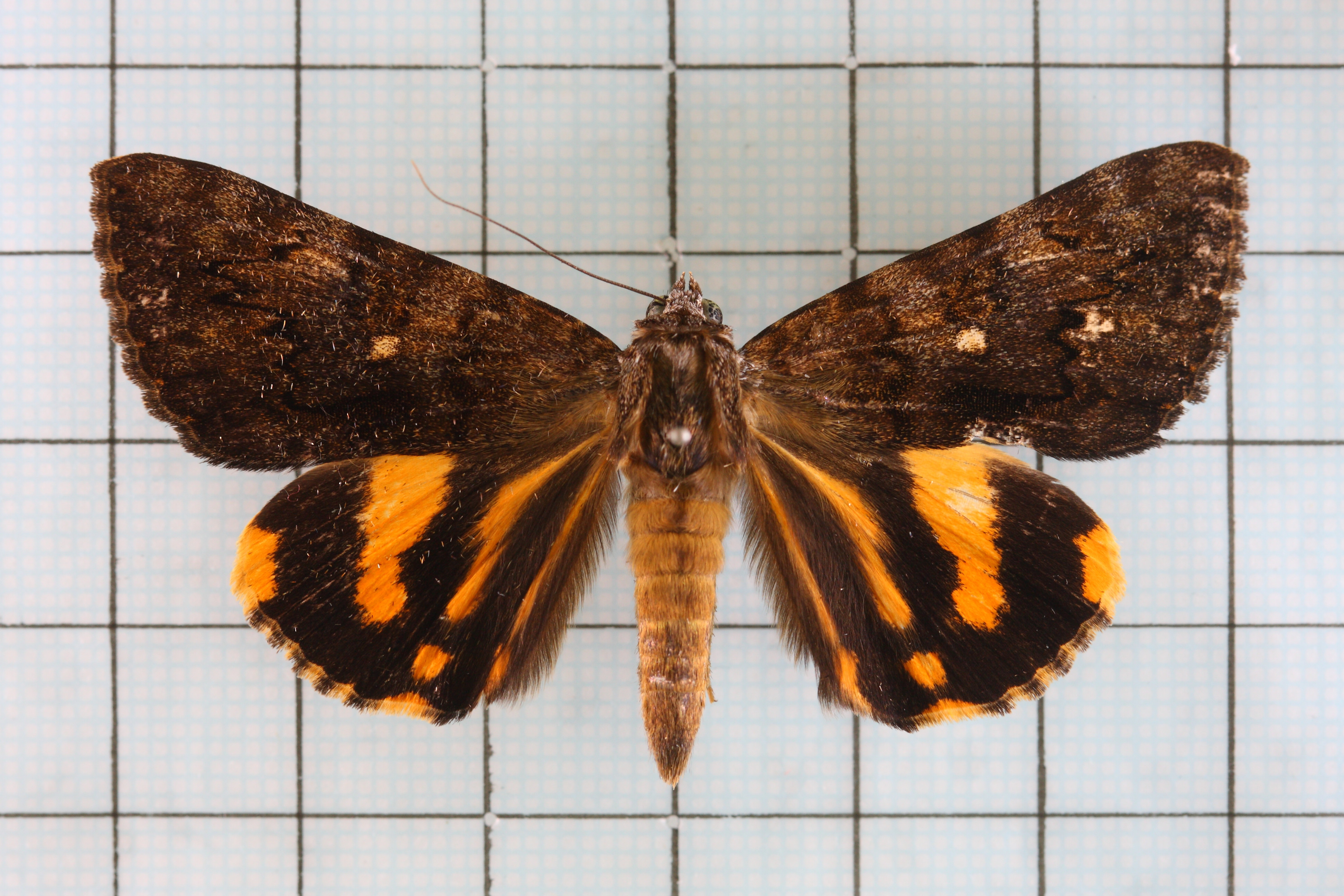

Scientific classification
- Kingdom: Animalia
- Phylum: Arthropoda
- Class: Insecta
- Order: Lepidoptera
- Superfamily: Noctuoidea
- Family: Erebidae
- Genus: Catocala
- Species: C. pataloides

Binomial name
- Catocala pataloides Mell, 1931

Synonyms
- Ephesia pataloides

= Catocala pataloides =

Species of moth

Catocala pataloides is a moth of the family Erebidae first described by Rudolf Mell in 1931. It is found in northeastern Laos and in the southeastern Chinese provinces of Guangxi, Guangdong and Hunan. and Taiwan.
