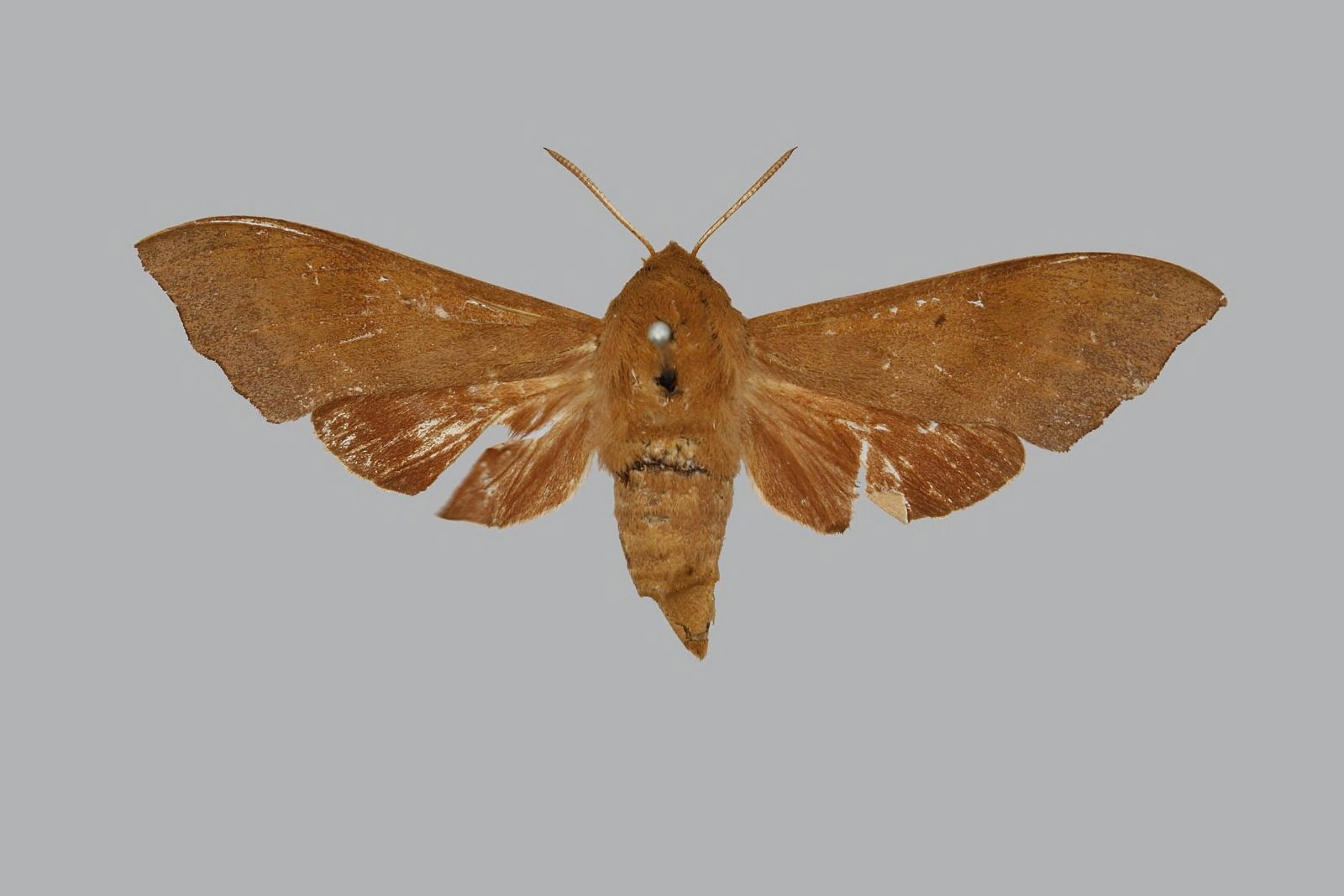
- Female

Scientific classification
- Domain: Eukaryota
- Kingdom: Animalia
- Phylum: Arthropoda
- Class: Insecta
- Order: Lepidoptera
- Family: Sphingidae
- Genus: Cypa
- Species: C. ferruginea

Binomial name
- Cypa ferruginea Walker, 1865

= Cypa ferruginea =

Species of moth

Cypa ferruginea is a species of moth of the family Sphingidae. It is known from Sri Lanka.

It is similar to Cypa decolor but the distal margin of the forewing is somewhat convex medially. Forewings are uniform red brown. Hindwings with the cilia white towards anal angle, which is less produced in the female than in the male.
