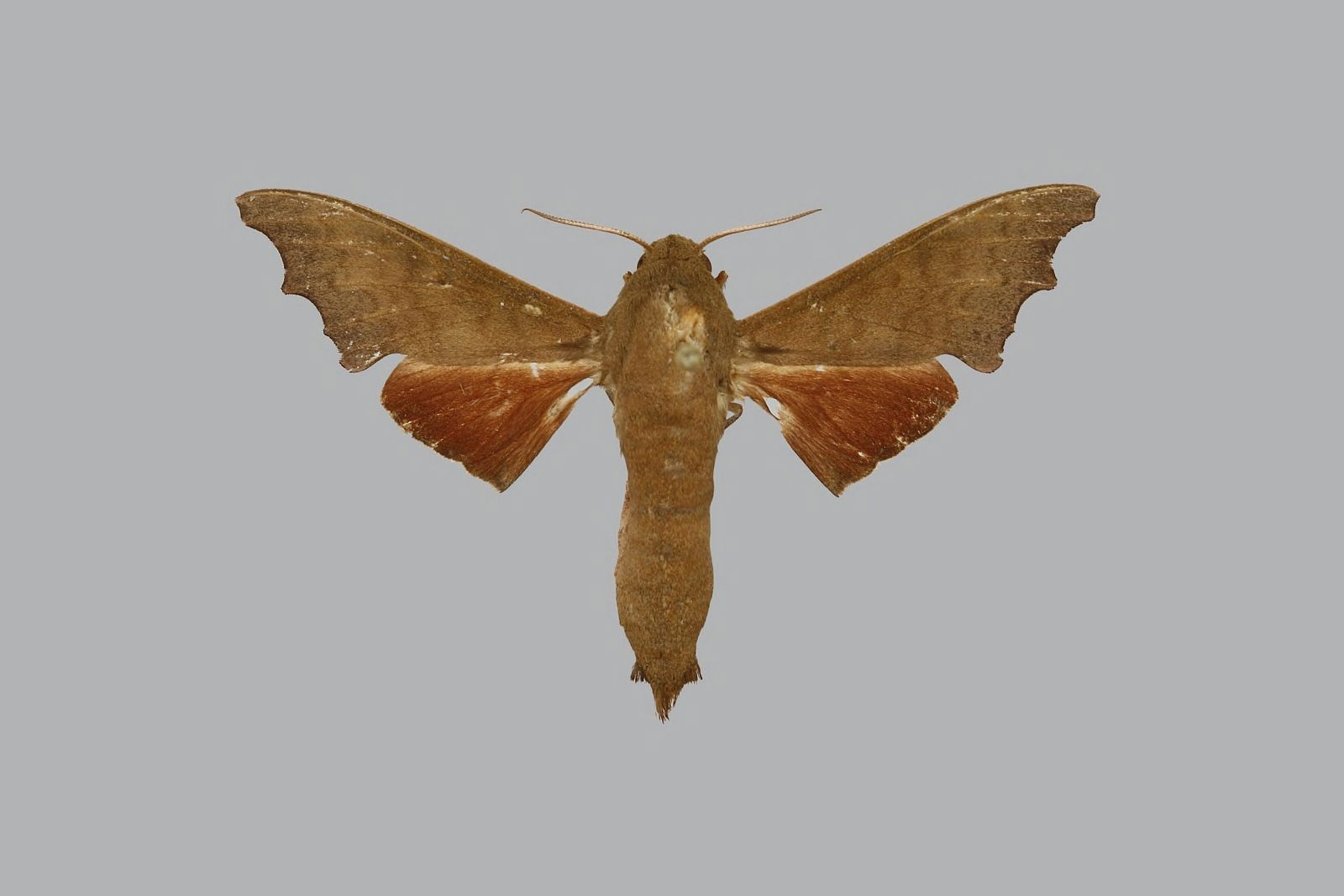
- Male

Scientific classification
- Domain: Eukaryota
- Kingdom: Animalia
- Phylum: Arthropoda
- Class: Insecta
- Order: Lepidoptera
- Family: Sphingidae
- Genus: Cypa
- Species: C. uniformis

Binomial name
- Cypa uniformis Mell, 1922

= Cypa uniformis =

Species of moth

Cypa uniformis is a species of moth of the family Sphingidae. It is known from China, north-western India and Borneo.

== Subspecies ==
- Cypa uniformis uniformis (China)
- Cypa uniformis attenuata Inoue, 1991 (Borneo)
- Cypa uniformis pallens Jordan, 1926 (north-western India)
