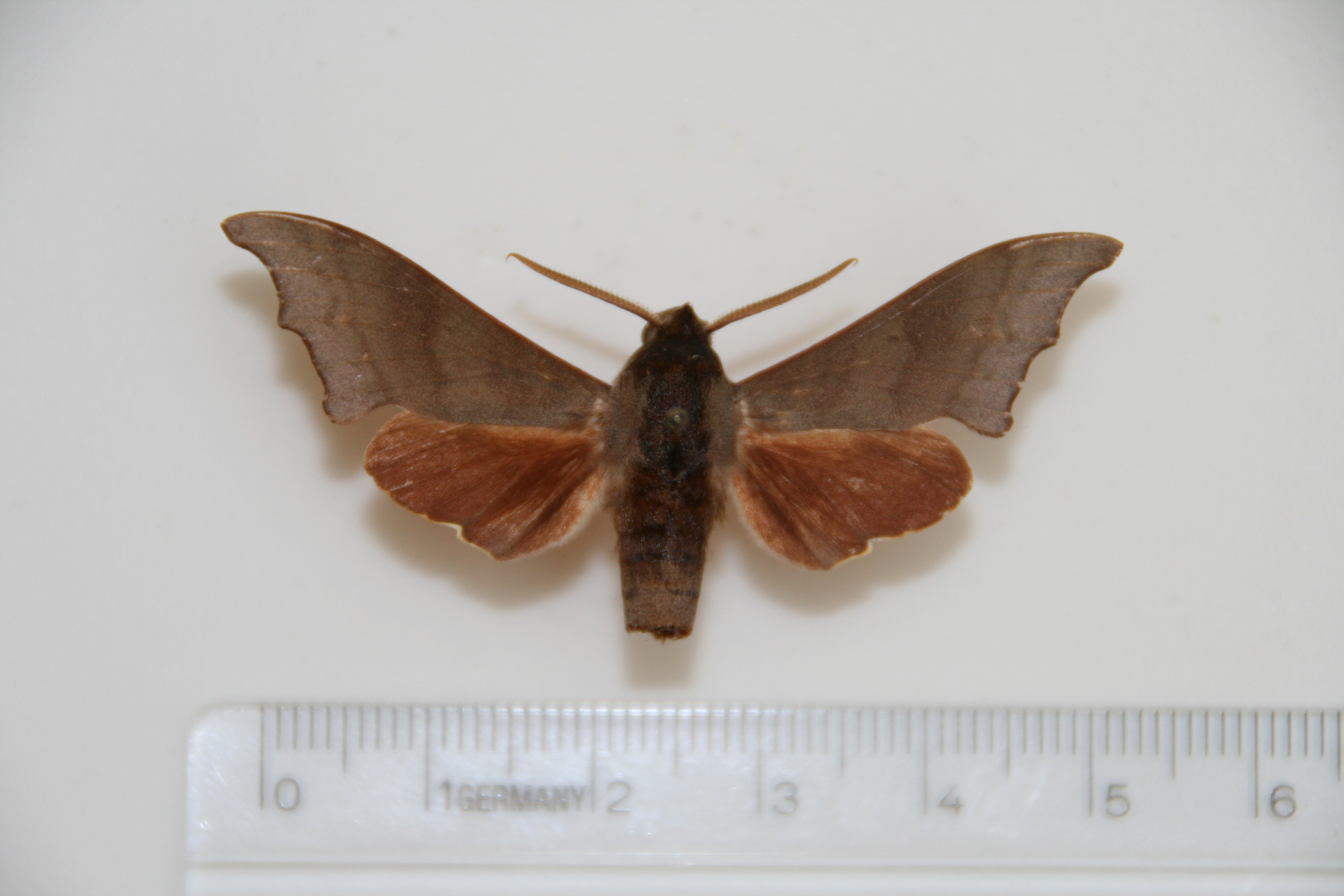

Scientific classification
- Kingdom: Animalia
- Phylum: Arthropoda
- Class: Insecta
- Order: Lepidoptera
- Family: Sphingidae
- Genus: Cypa
- Species: C. luzonica

Binomial name
- Cypa luzonica Brechlin, 2009

= Cypa luzonica =

Species of moth

Cypa luzonica is a species of moth of the family Sphingidae. It is known from the Philippines.
