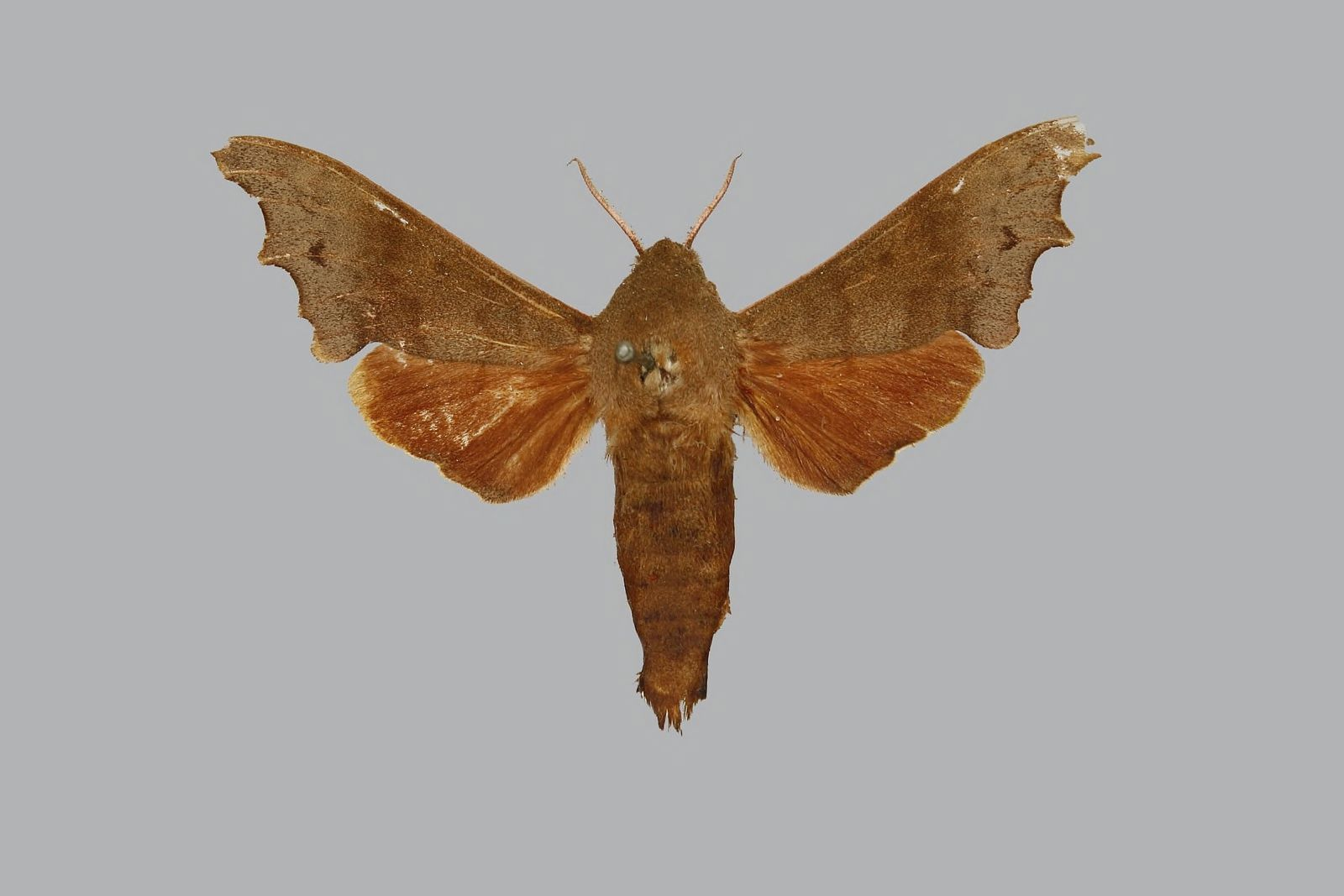
- Male

Scientific classification
- Domain: Eukaryota
- Kingdom: Animalia
- Phylum: Arthropoda
- Class: Insecta
- Order: Lepidoptera
- Family: Sphingidae
- Genus: Cypa
- Species: C. enodis

Binomial name
- Cypa enodis Jordan, 1931

= Cypa enodis =

Species of moth

Cypa enodis, the cinnamon cypa, is a species of moth of the family Sphingidae. It is known from Nepal, north-eastern India (Meghalaya), Thailand, southern China, northern Vietnam (Sa Pa), Taiwan and Peninsular Malaysia (Genting Highlands).

The wingspan is about 65 mm.

The larvae have been recorded feeding on Betula alnoides in India
