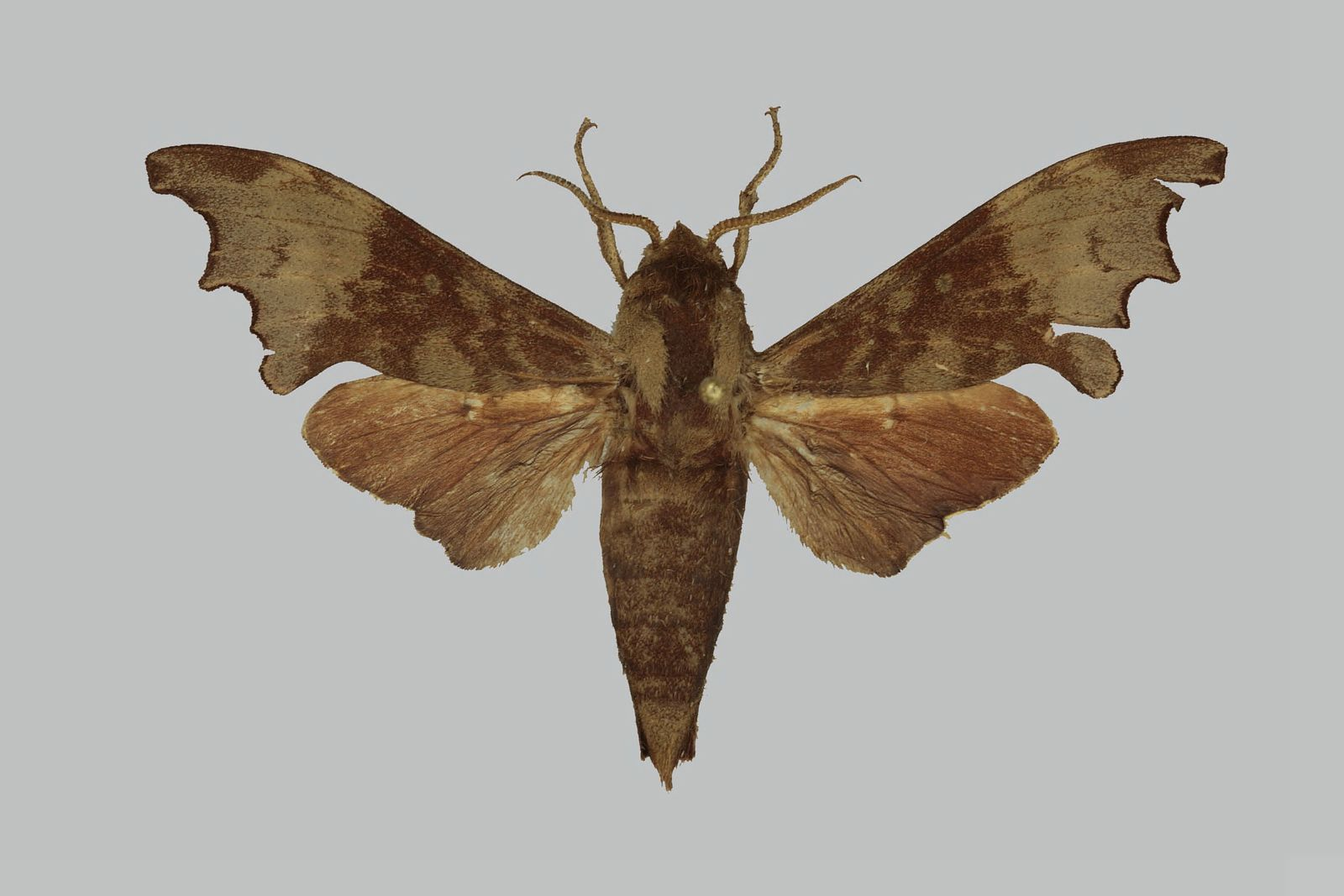

Scientific classification
- Kingdom: Animalia
- Phylum: Arthropoda
- Clade: Pancrustacea
- Class: Insecta
- Order: Lepidoptera
- Family: Sphingidae
- Genus: Cypa
- Species: C. bouyeri

Binomial name
- Cypa bouyeri Cadiou, 1998

= Cypa bouyeri =

Species of moth

Cypa bouyeri is a species of moth of the family Sphingidae. It is known from Sulawesi.
