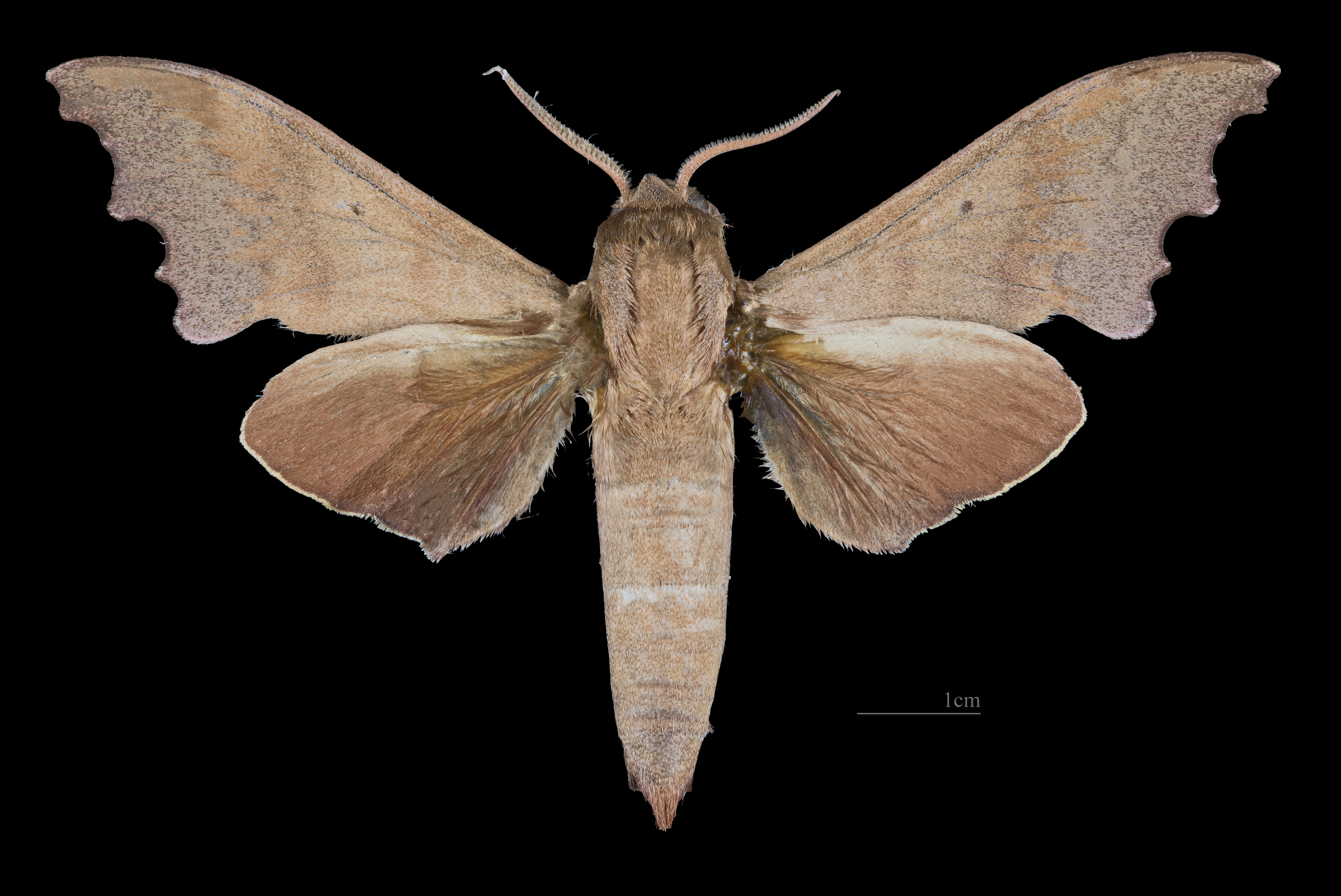
- Cypa decolor

Scientific classification
- Kingdom: Animalia
- Phylum: Arthropoda
- Clade: Pancrustacea
- Class: Insecta
- Order: Lepidoptera
- Family: Sphingidae
- Tribe: Smerinthini
- Genus: Cypa; Walker, 1865

= Cypa =

Genus of moths

Cypa is a genus of moths in the family Sphingidae. The genus was erected by Francis Walker in 1865.

== Species ==
- Cypa bouyeri Cadiou 1998
- Cypa claggi Clark 1935
- Cypa decolor (Walker 1856)
- Cypa duponti Roepke 1941
- Cypa enodis Jordan 1931
- Cypa ferruginea Walker 1865
- Cypa kitchingi Cadiou 1997
- Cypa latericia Inoue 1991
- Cypa luzonica Brechlin, 2009
- Cypa terranea (Butler 1876)
- Cypa uniformis Mell 1922
