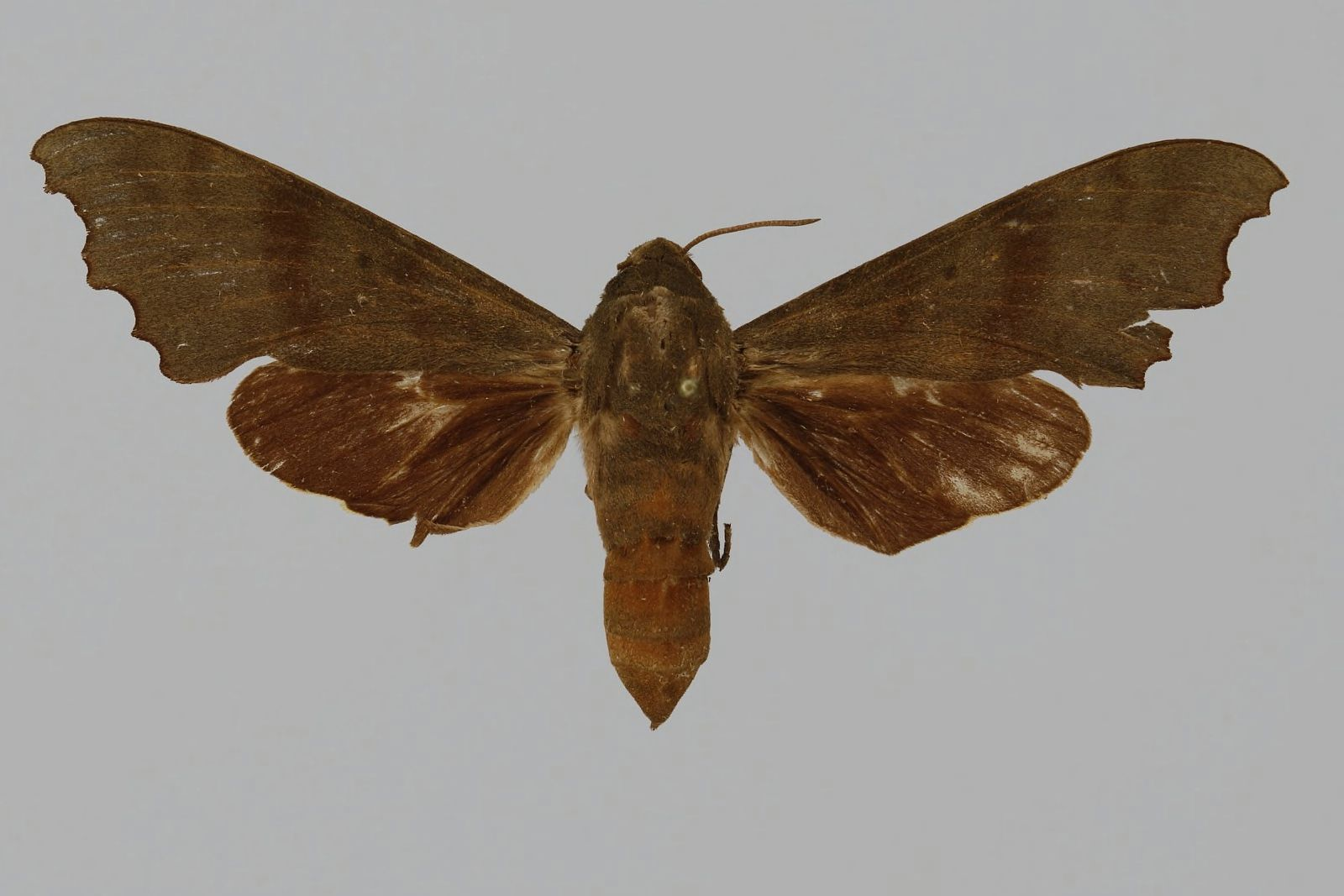
- Female

Scientific classification
- Domain: Eukaryota
- Kingdom: Animalia
- Phylum: Arthropoda
- Class: Insecta
- Order: Lepidoptera
- Family: Sphingidae
- Genus: Cypa
- Species: C. terranea

Binomial name
- Cypa terranea (Butler, 1876)

Synonyms
- Mimas terranea Butler, 1876; Smerinthulus terranea; Smerinthulus brooksi Clark, 1930

= Cypa terranea =

Species of moth

Cypa terranea is a species of moth of the family Sphingidae first described by Arthur Gardiner Butler in 1876. It is known from Sundaland.
