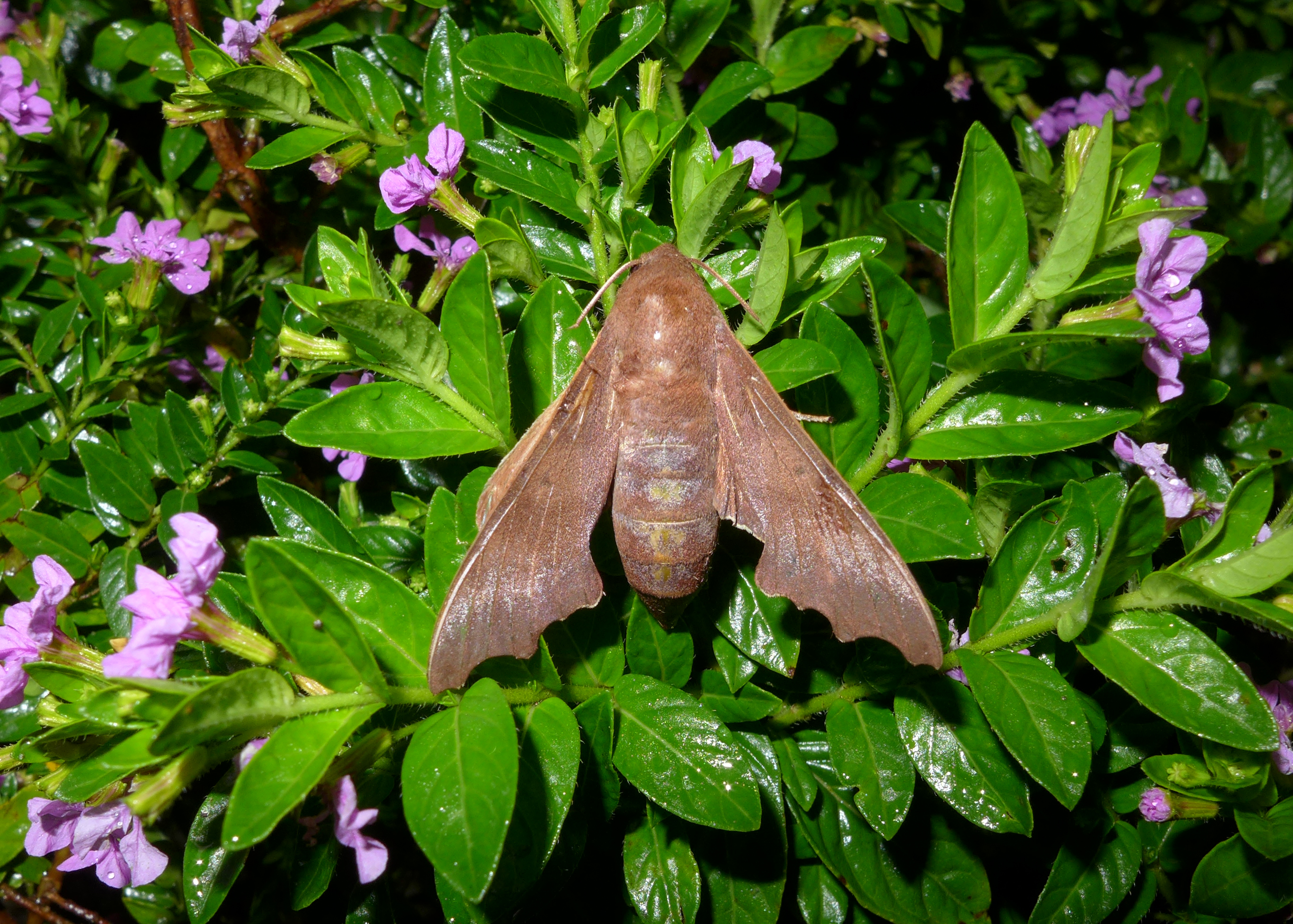
- C. d. decolor

Scientific classification
- Domain: Eukaryota
- Kingdom: Animalia
- Phylum: Arthropoda
- Class: Insecta
- Order: Lepidoptera
- Family: Sphingidae
- Genus: Cypa
- Species: C. decolor

Binomial name
- Cypa decolor (Walker, 1856)

Synonyms
- Smerinthus decolor Walker, 1856; Cypa incongruens Butler, 1881; Cypa decolor manilae Clark, 1930

= Cypa decolor =

Species of moth

Cypa decolor is a species of moth of the family Sphingidae first described by Francis Walker in 1856.

== Distribution ==
It is found in northeastern India, Nepal, Myanmar, southwestern China, Thailand, Vietnam, Malaysia (Sarawak) and Indonesia (Sumatra, Borneo, Kalimantan, Papua New Guinea).

== Description ==
The wingspan is 50–82 mm. The males tend to be more variegated than the females. It is similar to Cypa terranea but is greener brown above.

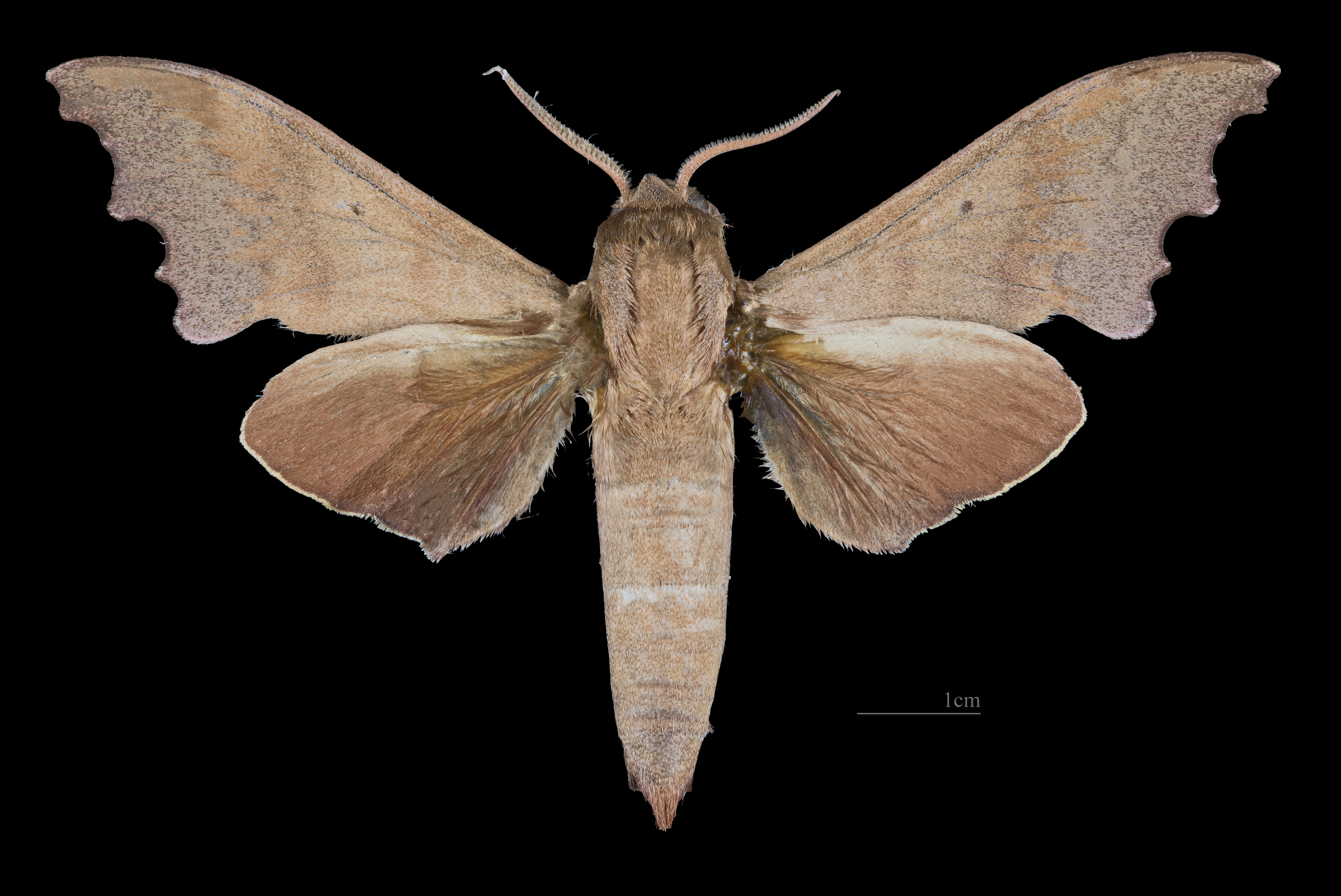
Male, dorsal view

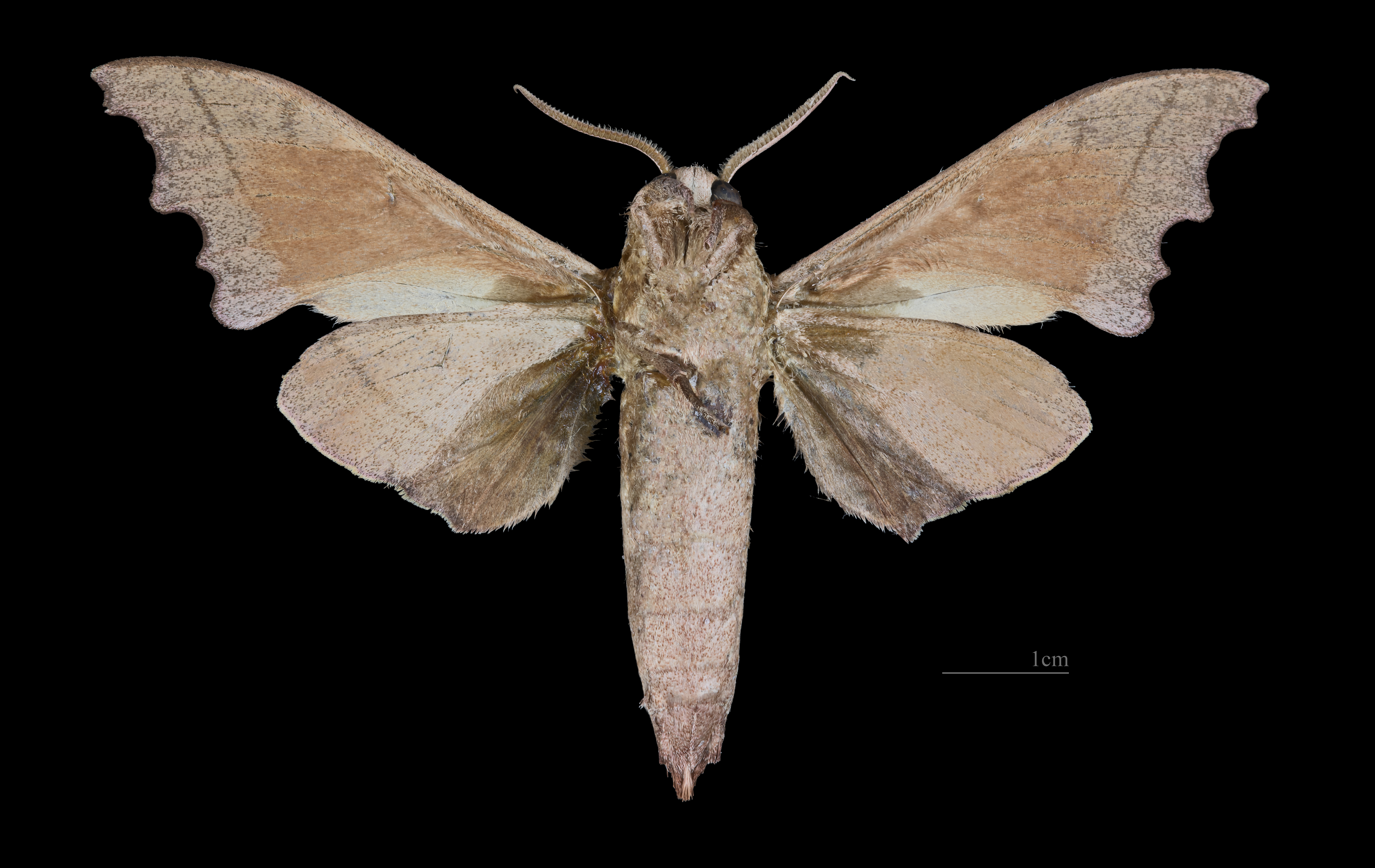
Male, ventral view

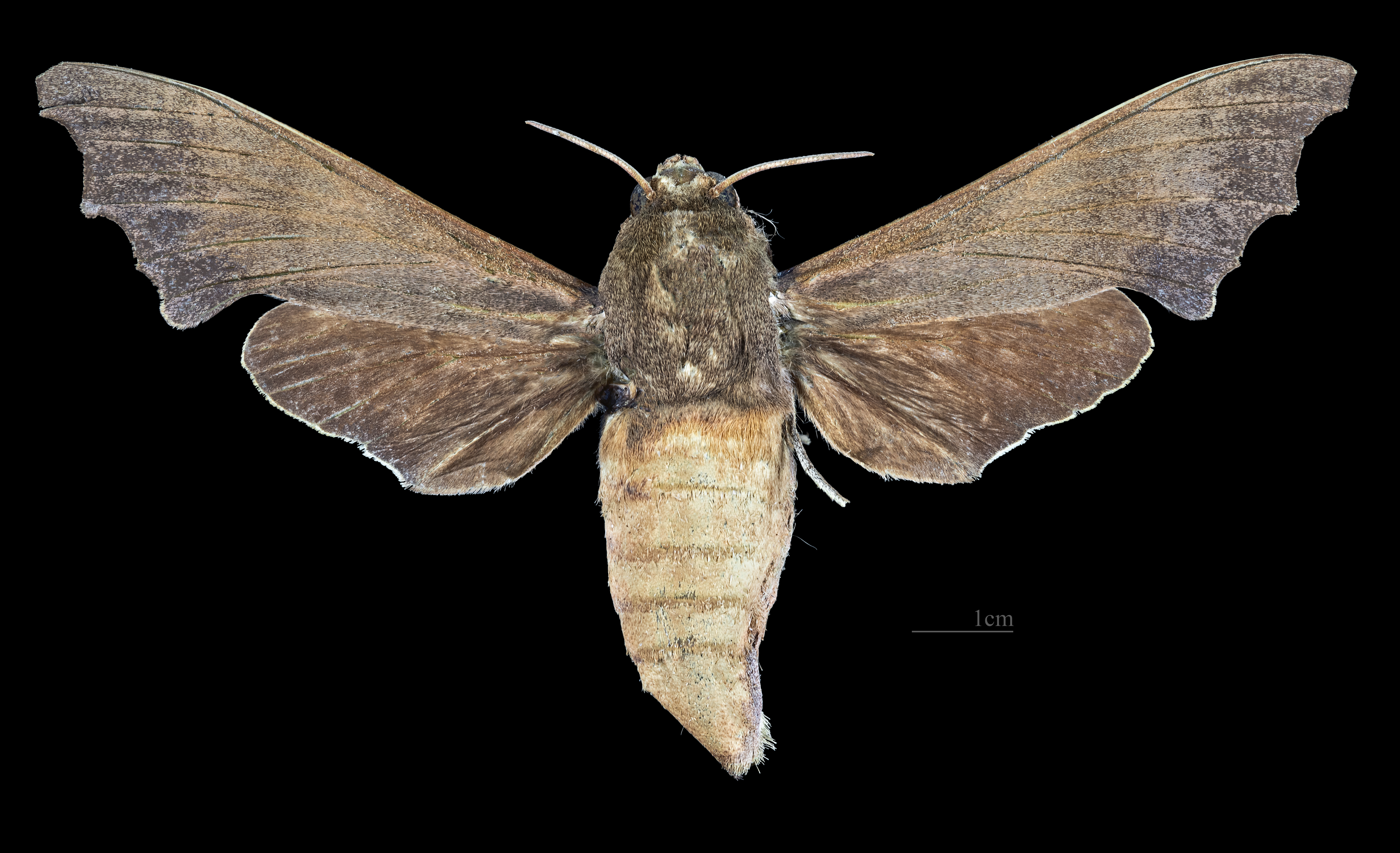
Female, dorsal view

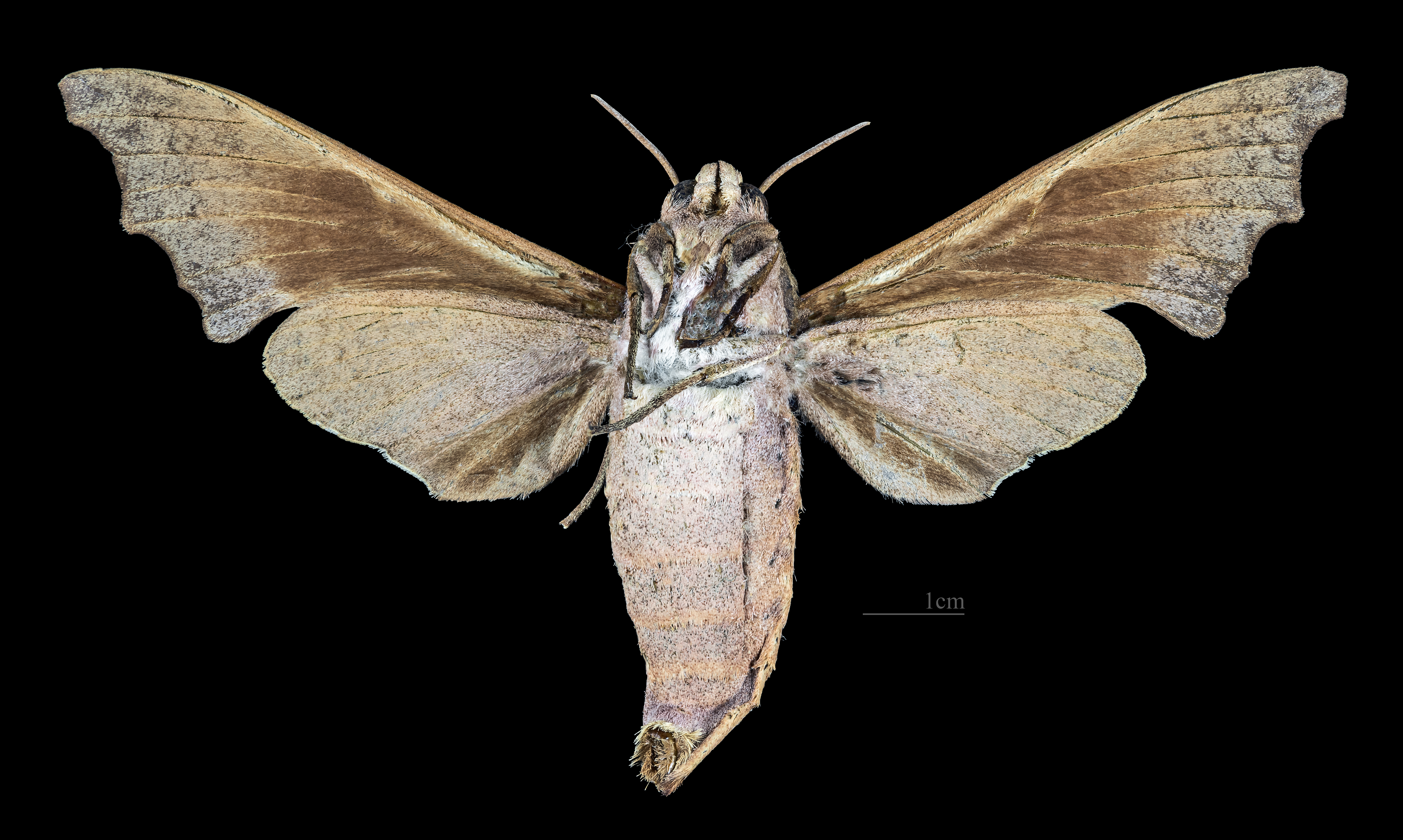
Female, ventral view

== Biology ==
The larvae feed on Quercus and Castanopsis species.

== Subspecies ==
- Cypa decolor decolor (north-eastern India, Nepal, Myanmar, southwestern China, Thailand, Vietnam, Malaysia (Sarawak) and Indonesia (Sumatra, Borneo, Kalimantan))
- Cypa decolor euroa Rothschild & Jordan, 1903 (Papua New Guinea)
