= Rudolf Mell =

German zoologist and entomologist

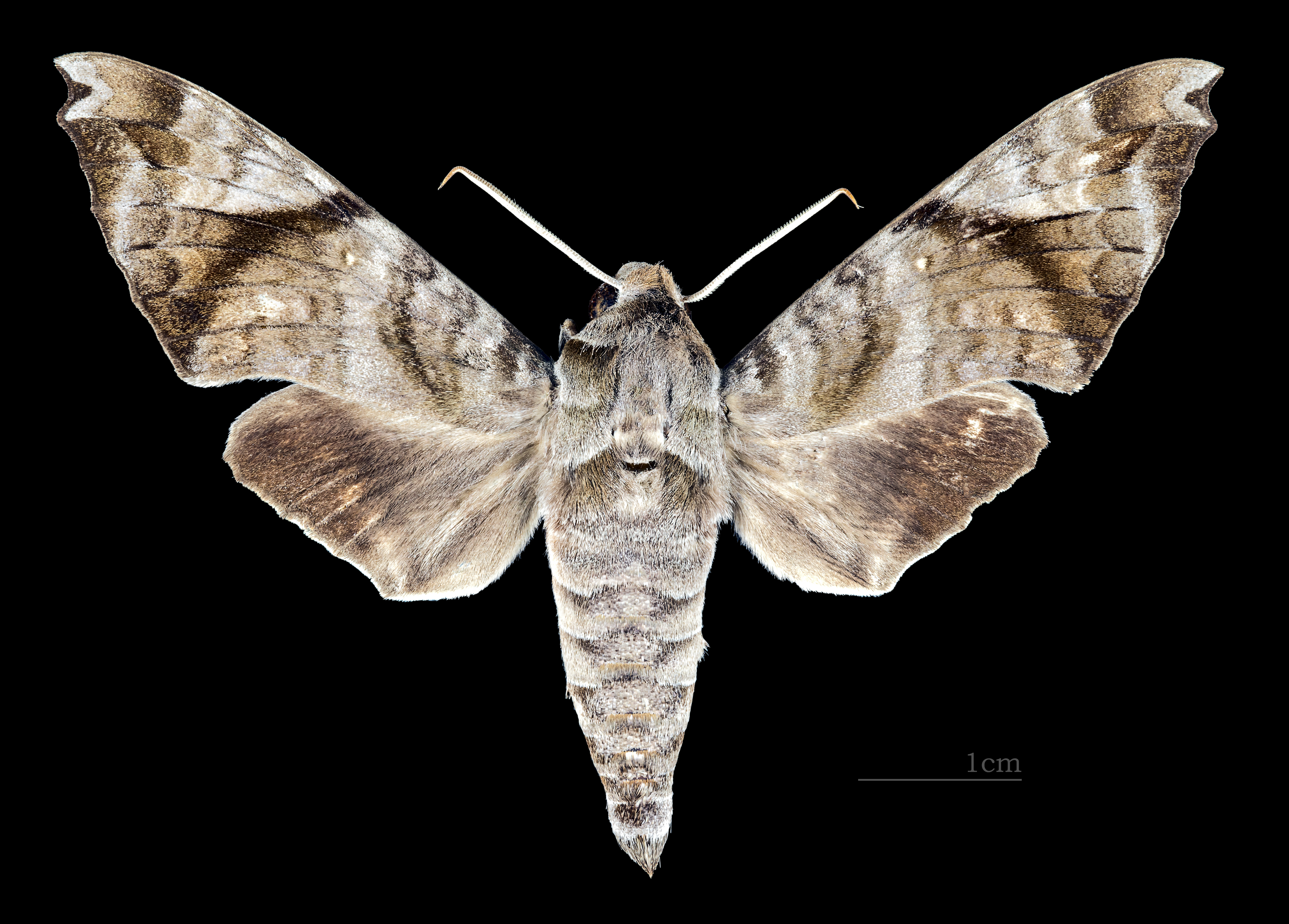
Acosmeryx pseudomissa a hawkmoth described by Mell in 1932

Rudolf Emil Mell (1878 in Gera, Thuringia – 1970 in Berlin) was a German zoologist and entomologist who specialised in Lepidoptera especially Sphingidae and the fauna of China. He was the director of the German-Chinese Middle School at Canton (Guangzhou) for some time. His collection of Sphingidae is held by the Carnegie Museum of Natural History in Pittsburgh. It was purchased by Benjamin Preston Clark.

== Taxa described by Mell (selected) ==
- Actias chapae (Sphingidae)
- Dahira hoenei (Sphingidae)
- Rhodambulyx davidi (Sphingidae)
- Cypa uniformis (Sphingidae)
- Catocala pataloides (Erebidae)
- Catocala dejeani (Erebidae)
- Teinopalpus aureus (Papilionidae)
- Mirina fenzeli (Endromidae)

== Works ==
(Partial list)

- Mell, Rudolf Emil, 1912 Eiablagen bei Insekten. Naturw. Wschr. 27(11), pp.
- Mell, R.E. 1922. Neue südchinesische Lepidoptera. Deutsche Entomologische Zeitschriftt 1922: 113–129.
- Mell, R.E. 1922 Beiträge zur Fauna sinica Biologie und systematik der südschinesischen sphingiden, zugleich ein versuch einer biologie tropischer lepidopteren überhaupt Berlin, R. Friedländer & sohn online
- Mell, Rudolf 1922 Beiträge zur Fauna Sinica. i. Die Vertebraten Südchinas; Feldlisten und Feldnoten der Säuger, Vögel, Reptilien, Batrachier. Archiv für Naturgeschichte 88 (10): 1-134
- Mell, 1923 Noch unbeschriebene Lepidopteren aus Südchina (2) Deutsche Entomologische Zeitschrift 1923 (2) : 153-160
- Mell R. 1930. Beiträge zur Fauna sinica. V. Die Brahmaeiden und Eupterotiden Chinas. Deutsche Entomologische Zeitschrift 1929(5):337–494, pls. 3–12.
- Mell, R., 1930 Beiträge zur Lurch- und Kriechtierfauna Kwangsi's. S. Ber. naturf. Freunde 1929, pp. 310–332
- Mell, R. 1931. List of Chinese snakes. Lingnan Sci. Jour., Canton, 8 [1929]: 199-219.
- Mell, R. 1935. Beiträge zur Fauna sinica. XV. Zur Systematik und Oekologie der Sphingiden und Saturniiden von Chekiang (Samml. Höne). Mitteilungen aus dem Zoologischen Museum in Berlin, 20: 337-365.
- Mell, Rudolf Emil ([1935]): Beiträge zur Fauna sinica. XII. Die Euthaliini (Lepidoptera, Nymphalidae) Süd-und Südostchinas Deutsche Entomologische Zeitschrift 1934, pp. [225-251, 1 pl]
- Mell, R.E. 1937 Beiträge zur Fauna sinica. XIV. Ergänzungen zur Sphingiden-, Brahmaeiden- und Eupterotidenfauna Chinas (Lep.). Deutsche Entomologische Zeitschrift 1937(1-2): 1–19.
- Mell, R., 1938. Beiträge zur Fauna sinica. XVII. Inventur und ökologisches Material zu einer Biologie der südchinesischen Lepidopteren. Deutsche Entomologische Zeitschrift 1938 (2) : 197-345. including Die Papilioniden Südchinas
- Mell, Rudolf Emil 1939 Beiträge zur Fauna sinica. XVIII. Noch unbeschriebene chinesische Lepidopteren (V). Deut. ent. Zeit. [Iris] 52(3/4), pp. [135-152]
- Mell, Rudolf Emil, 1943 Inventur und ökologisches Material zu einer Biologie der südchinesischen Pieriden. Beiträge zur Fauna sinica 21:-
- Rudolf Mell,1947 Mussestunden am Tropenrande - Ein Biologe erlebt China (1947) Condor-Verlag
- Mell, Rudolf Emil (1950): Artbildung durch physiologische Differenzierung (chemotaktische Antizipation) in der Gattung Rhopalocampta Wall. (Lepidopt. Hesperiidae). Bonn. zool. Beitr. 1, pp. [86-91, 1 pl, 1 fig]
- Rudolf Mell, 1951 Der Seidenspinner Akademische Verlagsgesellschaft Geest & Portig, Leipzig
- Rudolf Mell, 1955 Wochenend am Wendekreis.Begegnungen mit Tieren im Reiche des Drachen (Encounters with animals in the Kingdom of the Dragon) Franckh'sche Verlagshandlg., Stuttgart
- Mell, R. 1958. Zur Geschichte der ostasiatischen Lepidopteren I. Die Hebing Zentralasiens, das westchinesische Refugium zentralasiatischer Abkömmlinge und die Verbreitungsachse Sikkim/Kashiaberge - Zentralformosa (Achse V). Beiträge zur Fauna sinica XXV. Deutsche Entomologische Zeitschrift, Berlin (N.F.), 5: 185-213.
- Rudolf Mell,1960 Bergwaldtiere am Tropenrand [Mountain forest animals at the edge of the tropics] Stuttgart Franckh'sche Verlagsbuchhandlung

== See also ==
- Sino-German cooperation (1926–1941)
