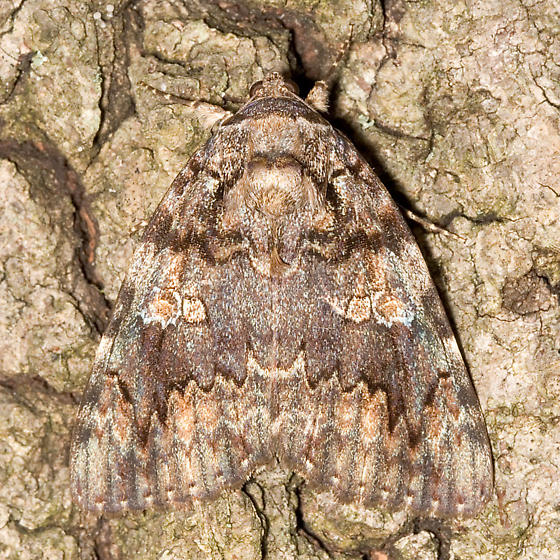

Scientific classification
- Kingdom: Animalia
- Phylum: Arthropoda
- Class: Insecta
- Order: Lepidoptera
- Superfamily: Noctuoidea
- Family: Erebidae
- Genus: Catocala
- Species: C. umbrosa

Binomial name
- Catocala umbrosa Brou, 2002

Synonyms
- Catocala f. umbrosa Worthington, 1883

= Catocala umbrosa =

Species of moth

specimen illustrated is not Catocala umbrosa Brou, nor does it occur in Arizona, nor Canada.

Catocala umbrosa is a moth of the family Erebidae first described by Vernon Antoine Brou Jr. in 2002. It is found from Arizona east to New Jersey and from Florida north to Canada.

Adults are on wing from April to August. There is one generation per year.
