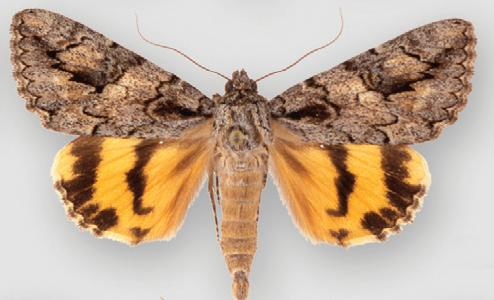

Scientific classification
- Kingdom: Animalia
- Phylum: Arthropoda
- Class: Insecta
- Order: Lepidoptera
- Superfamily: Noctuoidea
- Family: Erebidae
- Genus: Catocala
- Species: C. johnsoniana

Binomial name
- Catocala johnsoniana Brower, 1976

= Catocala johnsoniana =

Species of moth

Catocala johnsoniana, or Johnson's underwing, is a moth of the family Erebidae. The species was first described by Auburn Edmund Brower in 1976. It is found in the US state of California.

Adults are on wing from June to July. There is probably one generation per year.
