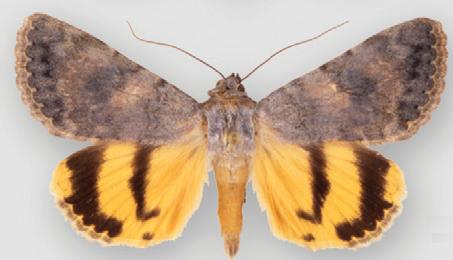

Scientific classification
- Kingdom: Animalia
- Phylum: Arthropoda
- Class: Insecta
- Order: Lepidoptera
- Superfamily: Noctuoidea
- Family: Erebidae
- Genus: Catocala
- Species: C. frederici

Binomial name
- Catocala frederici Grote, 1872

= Catocala frederici =

Species of moth

Catocala frederici is a moth of the family Erebidae. It is found in Texas, Oklahoma, New Mexico and Arizona.

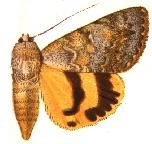
Illustration

The wingspan is 40–52 mm. Adults are on wing from June to September depending on the location. There is probably one generation per year.
