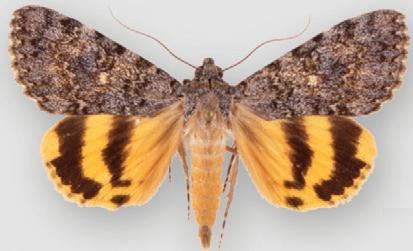

Conservation status
- Imperiled (NatureServe)

Scientific classification
- Kingdom: Animalia
- Phylum: Arthropoda
- Class: Insecta
- Order: Lepidoptera
- Superfamily: Noctuoidea
- Family: Erebidae
- Genus: Catocala
- Species: C. caesia

Binomial name
- Catocala caesia Hawks, 2010

= Catocala caesia =

Species of moth

Catocala caesia is a moth of the family Erebidae. It is found in the mountains of south-eastern Arizona and south-western New Mexico (United States), and southward through the Sierra Madre Occidental in Chihuahua (Mexico).

The length of the forewings is 22.4 mm for males and 25 mm for females.
