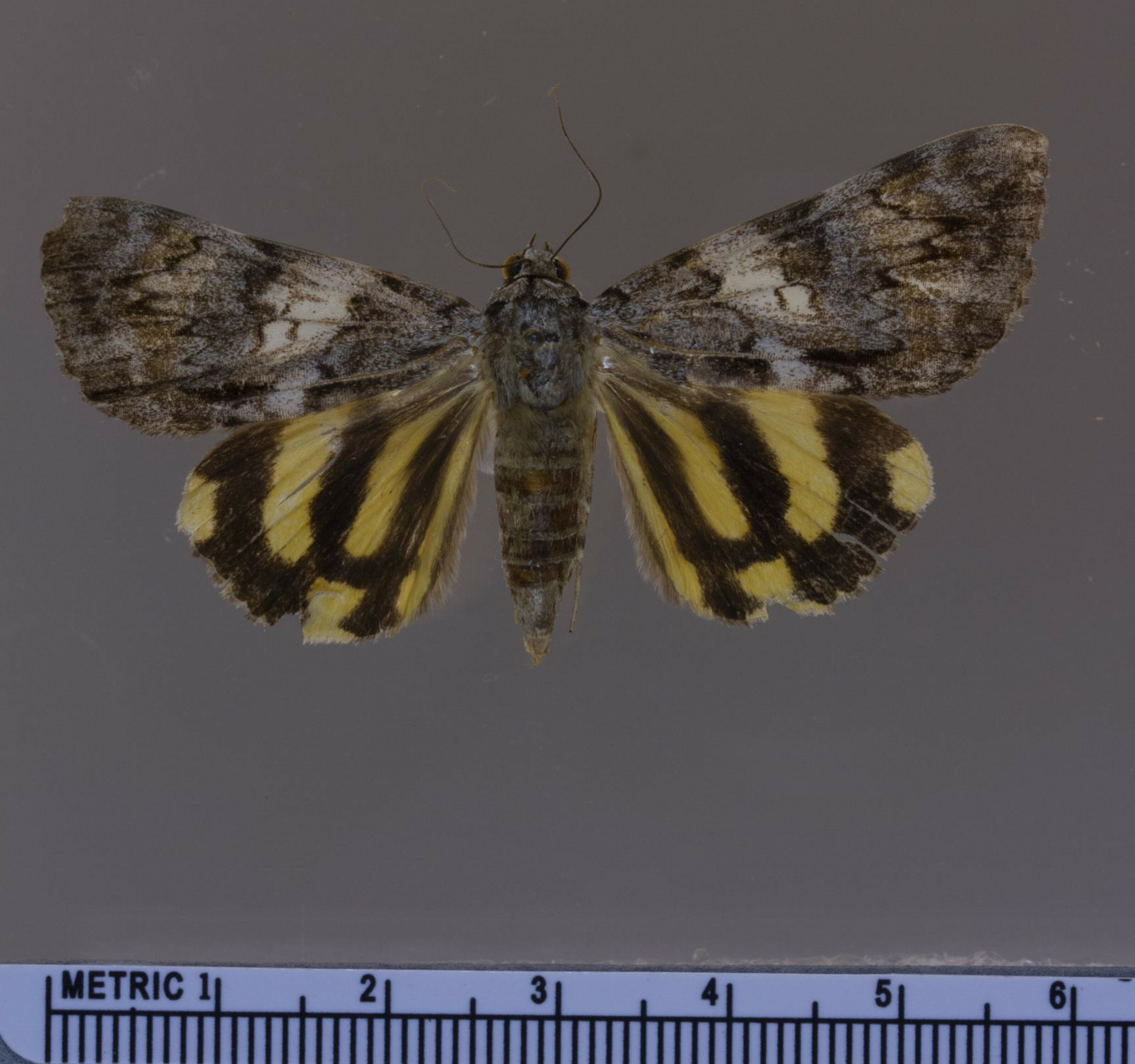

Scientific classification
- Kingdom: Animalia
- Phylum: Arthropoda
- Clade: Pancrustacea
- Class: Insecta
- Order: Lepidoptera
- Superfamily: Noctuoidea
- Family: Erebidae
- Genus: Catocala
- Species: C. naganoi

Binomial name
- Catocala naganoi Sugi, 1982

Synonyms
- Catocala nagansi Sugi, 1982

= Catocala naganoi =

Species of moth

Catocala naganoi is a moth in the family Erebidae first described by Shigero Sugi in 1982. It is found exclusively in Taiwan.
