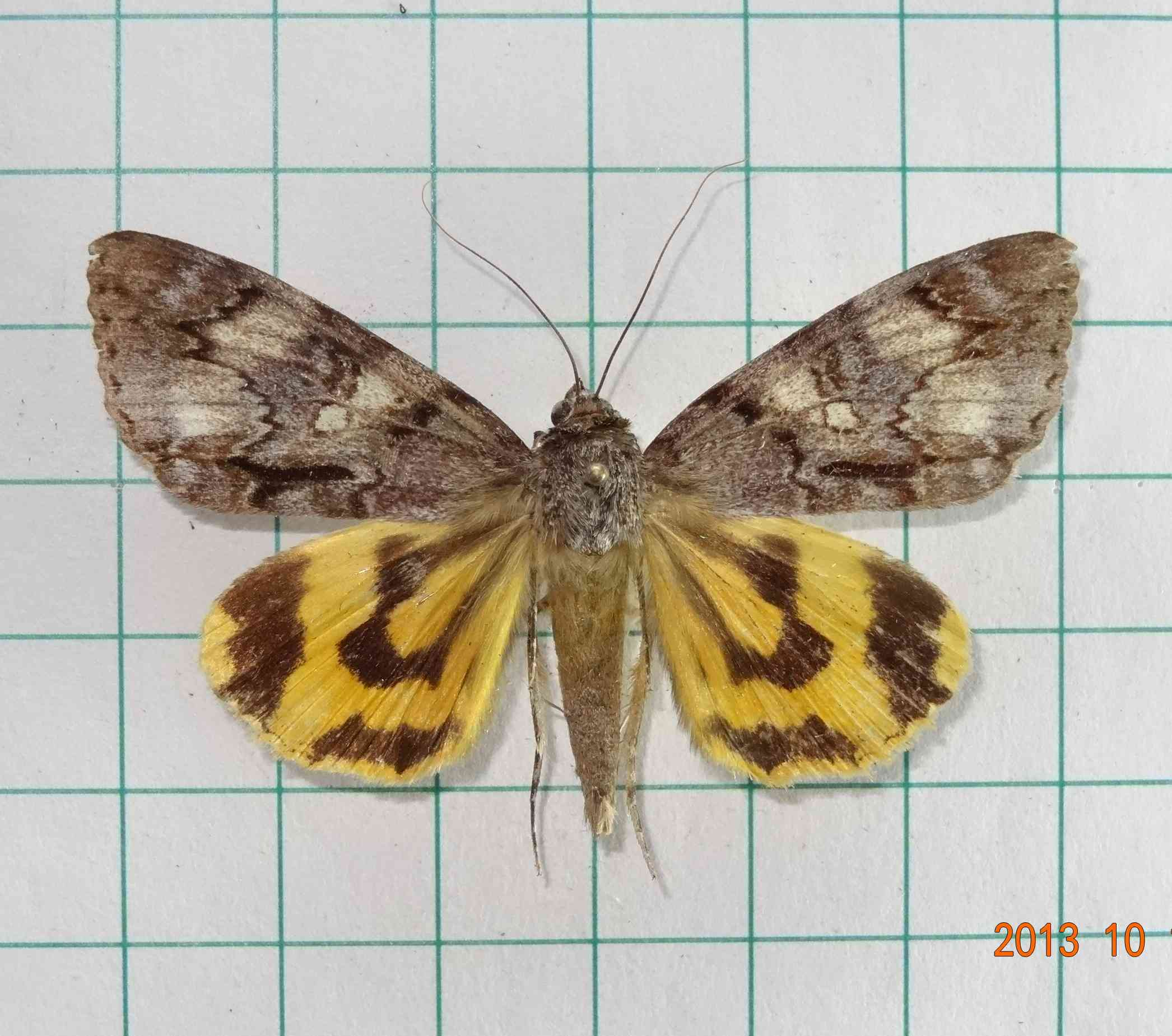

Scientific classification
- Kingdom: Animalia
- Phylum: Arthropoda
- Class: Insecta
- Order: Lepidoptera
- Superfamily: Noctuoidea
- Family: Erebidae
- Genus: Catocala
- Species: C. wushensis

Binomial name
- Catocala wushensis Okano, 1964

= Catocala wushensis =

Species of moth

Catocala wushensis is a moth of the family Erebidae. It is found in Taiwan.

The wingspan is about 74 mm.
