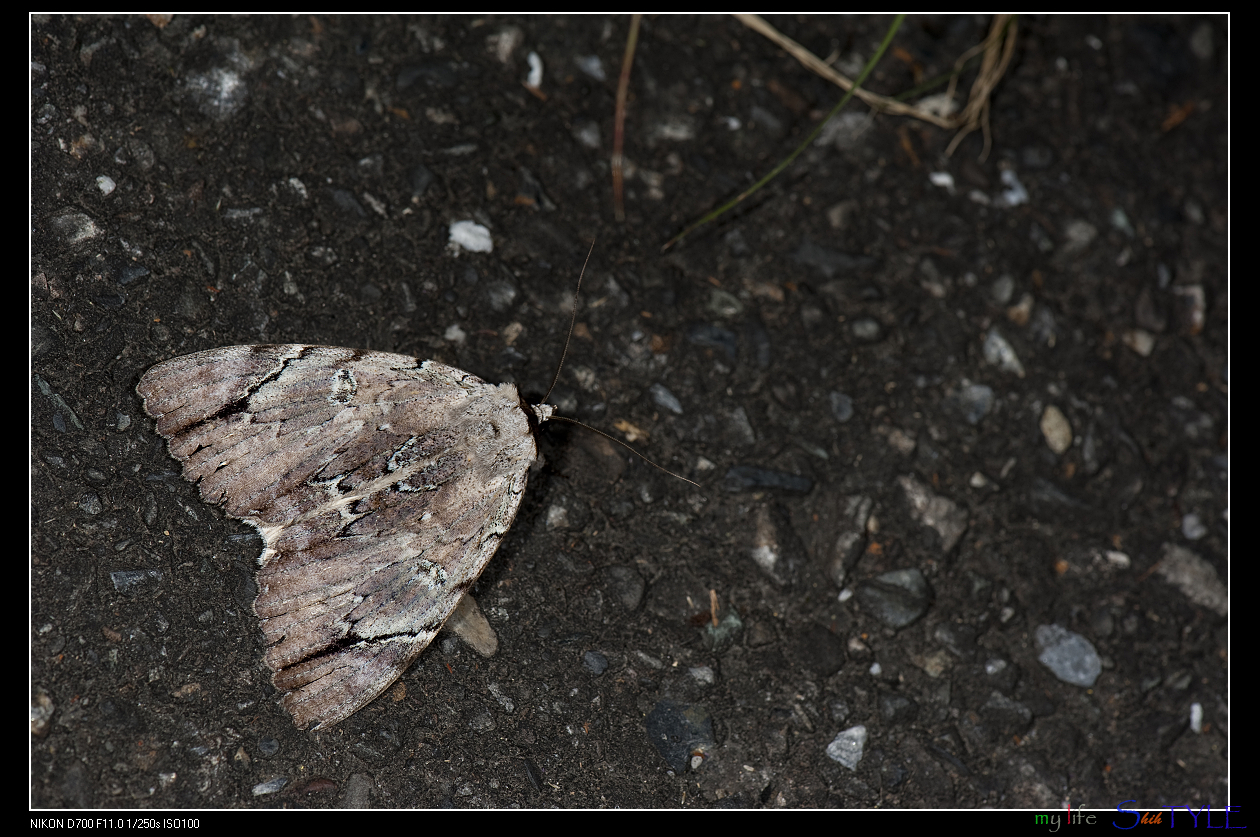
- Catocala nivea asahinaorum

Scientific classification
- Kingdom: Animalia
- Phylum: Arthropoda
- Class: Insecta
- Order: Lepidoptera
- Superfamily: Noctuoidea
- Family: Erebidae
- Genus: Catocala
- Species: C. nivea

Binomial name
- Catocala nivea Butler, 1877

= Catocala nivea =

Species of moth

Catocala nivea is a moth in the family Erebidae first described by Arthur Gardiner Butler in 1877. It is found in Japan and Taiwan.

== Subspecies ==
- Catocala nivea nivea
- Catocala nivea asahinaorum Owada, 1986 (Taiwan)
- Catocala nivea krosawai Owada, 1986
