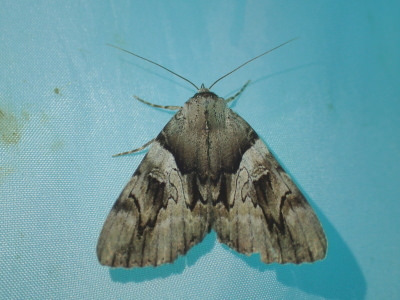

Scientific classification
- Kingdom: Animalia
- Phylum: Arthropoda
- Clade: Pancrustacea
- Class: Insecta
- Order: Lepidoptera
- Superfamily: Noctuoidea
- Family: Erebidae
- Genus: Catocala
- Species: C. xarippe

Binomial name
- Catocala xarippe Butler, 1877

Synonyms
- Catocala fulminea xarippe Butler, 1877

= Catocala xarippe =

Species of moth

Catocala xarippe is a moth in the family Erebidae. It is found in the Korean Peninsula, Japan, and the Russian Far East.

== Subspecies ==
- Catocala xarippe xarippe
- Catocala xarippe okitsuhimenomikoto Ishizuka, 2009 (Japan)
- Catocala xarippe santanensis Ishizuka, 2009 (Russia: Primorje)
