= Catocala puerperoides =

Scientific classification
- Kingdom: Animalia
- Phylum: Arthropoda
- Class: Insecta
- Order: Lepidoptera
- Superfamily: Noctuoidea
- Family: Erebidae
- Genus: Catocala
- Species: C. puerperoides

Binomial name
- Catocala puerperoides Kravchenko et al., 2008

Species of moth

Catocala puerperoides is a moth of the family Erebidae first described by Vasiliy D. Kravchenko et al. in 2008. It is restricted to more northern parts of Iran, reaching the southernmost distribution in southeastern Zagros, provinces Azerbayejan-e-Sharqi (eastern Azerbaijan), Mazandaran, Tehran, Lorestan, Khuzestan and Kohkiluye va Boyer-Ahmad.

The wingspan is 73–84 mm. Adults are on wing from June to October.
