= Catocala praegnax =

Scientific classification
- Kingdom: Animalia
- Phylum: Arthropoda
- Class: Insecta
- Order: Lepidoptera
- Superfamily: Noctuoidea
- Family: Erebidae
- Genus: Catocala
- Species: C. praegnax

Binomial name
- Catocala praegnax Walker, 1858

Synonyms
- Catocala obliterata Ménétriés, 1863; Catocala esther Butler, 1877

Species of moth

Catocala praegnax is a moth in the family Erebidae first described by Francis Walker in 1858. It is found in Japan, northern China and Taiwan.

== Subspecies ==
- Catocala praegnax praegnax
- Catocala praegnax sakaii Kishida, 1981 (Taiwan)
