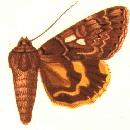

Scientific classification
- Kingdom: Animalia
- Phylum: Arthropoda
- Class: Insecta
- Order: Lepidoptera
- Superfamily: Noctuoidea
- Family: Erebidae
- Genus: Catocala
- Species: C. dotatoides

Binomial name
- Catocala dotatoides Poole, 1989

Synonyms
- Ephesia dotata; Catocala dotata Walker, 1858 (preocc. Herrich-Schäffer, 1851)

= Catocala dotatoides =

Species of moth

Catocala dotatoides is a moth of the family Erebidae first described by Robert W. Poole in 1989. It is found in India.
