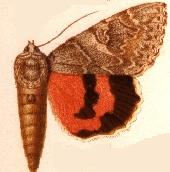

Scientific classification
- Kingdom: Animalia
- Phylum: Arthropoda
- Class: Insecta
- Order: Lepidoptera
- Superfamily: Noctuoidea
- Family: Erebidae
- Genus: Catocala
- Species: C. repudiata

Binomial name
- Catocala repudiata Staudinger, 1888

= Catocala repudiata =

Species of moth

Catocala repudiata is a moth of the family Erebidae first described by Otto Staudinger in 1888. It is found in western Turkestan and Xinjiang.
