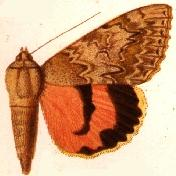

Scientific classification
- Kingdom: Animalia
- Phylum: Arthropoda
- Class: Insecta
- Order: Lepidoptera
- Superfamily: Noctuoidea
- Family: Erebidae
- Genus: Catocala
- Species: C. remissa

Binomial name
- Catocala remissa Staudinger, 1892

= Catocala remissa =

Species of moth

Catocala remissa is a moth of the family Erebidae first described by Otto Staudinger in 1892. It is found in Turkmenistan and Kazakhstan.
