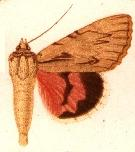

Scientific classification
- Kingdom: Animalia
- Phylum: Arthropoda
- Class: Insecta
- Order: Lepidoptera
- Superfamily: Noctuoidea
- Family: Erebidae
- Genus: Catocala
- Species: C. desiderata

Binomial name
- Catocala desiderata Staudinger, 1888

= Catocala desiderata =

Species of moth

Catocala desiderata is a moth of the family Erebidae first described by Staudinger in 1888. It is found in Asia, including Uzbekistan, Tajikistan and Xinjiang in China.
