= Catocala solntsevi =

Scientific classification
- Domain: Eukaryota
- Kingdom: Animalia
- Phylum: Arthropoda
- Class: Insecta
- Order: Lepidoptera
- Superfamily: Noctuoidea
- Family: Erebidae
- Genus: Catocala
- Species: C. solntsevi

Binomial name
- Catocala solntsevi Sviridov, 1997

Species of moth

Catocala solntsevi is a moth of the family Erebidae first described by Andreĭ Valentinovich Sviridov in 1997. It is found in Guangdong in China and Vietnam.

The wingspan is about 75 mm.
