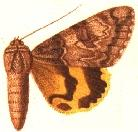

Scientific classification
- Kingdom: Animalia
- Phylum: Arthropoda
- Class: Insecta
- Order: Lepidoptera
- Superfamily: Noctuoidea
- Family: Erebidae
- Genus: Catocala
- Species: C. persimilis

Binomial name
- Catocala persimilis Warren, 1888

Synonyms
- Ephesia persimilis

= Catocala persimilis =

Species of moth

Catocala persimilis is a moth of the family Erebidae, first described by William Warren in 1888. It is found in western India.
