= Catocala afghana =

Scientific classification
- Kingdom: Animalia
- Phylum: Arthropoda
- Class: Insecta
- Order: Lepidoptera
- Superfamily: Noctuoidea
- Family: Erebidae
- Genus: Catocala
- Species: C. afghana

Binomial name
- Catocala afghana C. Swinhoe, 1885

Species of moth

Catocala afghana is a moth in the family Erebidae first described by Charles Swinhoe in 1885. It is found in Pakistan and Afghanistan. The species is 92 millimetres (3.6 in) long.
