= Catocala ella =

Scientific classification
- Kingdom: Animalia
- Phylum: Arthropoda
- Class: Insecta
- Order: Lepidoptera
- Superfamily: Noctuoidea
- Family: Erebidae
- Genus: Catocala
- Species: C. ella

Binomial name
- Catocala ella Butler, 1877

Synonyms
- Catocala nutrix Graeser, 1888

Species of moth

Catocala ella is a moth in the family Erebidae first described by Arthur Gardiner Butler in 1877. It is found in south-eastern Siberia and Japan.
