= Catocala ariana =

Scientific classification
- Kingdom: Animalia
- Phylum: Arthropoda
- Class: Insecta
- Order: Lepidoptera
- Superfamily: Noctuoidea
- Family: Erebidae
- Genus: Catocala
- Species: C. ariana

Binomial name
- Catocala ariana (Vartian, 1964)

Synonyms
- Ephesia ariana Vartian, 1964

Species of moth

Catocala ariana is a moth in the family Erebidae first described by Eva Vartian in 1964. It is found in Afghanistan.
