= Catocala toropovi =

Scientific classification
- Kingdom: Animalia
- Phylum: Arthropoda
- Clade: Pancrustacea
- Class: Insecta
- Order: Lepidoptera
- Superfamily: Noctuoidea
- Family: Erebidae
- Genus: Catocala
- Species: C. toropovi

Binomial name
- Catocala toropovi Saldaitis, Kons & Borth, 2014

Species of moth

Catocala toropovi is a moth in the family Erebidae. It is found in Kazakhstan.
