= Catocala inconstans =

Scientific classification
- Kingdom: Animalia
- Phylum: Arthropoda
- Class: Insecta
- Order: Lepidoptera
- Superfamily: Noctuoidea
- Family: Erebidae
- Genus: Catocala
- Species: C. inconstans

Binomial name
- Catocala inconstans Butler, 1889

Species of moth

Catocala inconstans is a moth in the family Erebidae first described by Arthur Gardiner Butler in 1889. It is found in Himachal Pradesh, India.
