= Catocala dariana =

Scientific classification
- Kingdom: Animalia
- Phylum: Arthropoda
- Clade: Pancrustacea
- Class: Insecta
- Order: Lepidoptera
- Superfamily: Noctuoidea
- Family: Erebidae
- Genus: Catocala
- Species: C. dariana

Binomial name
- Catocala dariana Sviridov, Speidel, Reshöft, 1996

Species of moth

Catocala dariana is a moth in the family Erebidae. It is found in Afghanistan.
