= Catocala viviannae =

Scientific classification
- Kingdom: Animalia
- Phylum: Arthropoda
- Class: Insecta
- Order: Lepidoptera
- Superfamily: Noctuoidea
- Family: Erebidae
- Genus: Catocala
- Species: C. viviannae

Binomial name
- Catocala viviannae Hacker & Kautt, 1996

Species of moth

Catocala viviannae is a moth of the family Erebidae. It is found in Turkey and Iran.

Adults are on wing from July to August.
