= Catocala luscinia =

Scientific classification
- Kingdom: Animalia
- Phylum: Arthropoda
- Class: Insecta
- Order: Lepidoptera
- Superfamily: Noctuoidea
- Family: Erebidae
- Genus: Catocala
- Species: C. luscinia

Binomial name
- Catocala luscinia Brandt, 1938

Species of moth

Catocala luscinia is a moth in the family Erebidae first described by Wilhelm Brandt in 1938. It is found in Iran.
