= Catocala prolifica =

Scientific classification
- Kingdom: Animalia
- Phylum: Arthropoda
- Class: Insecta
- Order: Lepidoptera
- Superfamily: Noctuoidea
- Family: Erebidae
- Genus: Catocala
- Species: C. prolifica

Binomial name
- Catocala prolifica Walker, 1857

Species of moth

Catocala prolifica is a moth in the family Erebidae first described by Francis Walker in 1857. It is found in India.
