= Catocala catei =

Scientific classification
- Kingdom: Animalia
- Phylum: Arthropoda
- Class: Insecta
- Order: Lepidoptera
- Superfamily: Noctuoidea
- Family: Erebidae
- Genus: Catocala
- Species: C. catei

Binomial name
- Catocala catei Weisert, 1998

Species of moth

Catocala catei is a moth in the family Erebidae first described by Friedrich Weisert in 1998. It is found in Iran.
