= Catocala paki =

Scientific classification
- Kingdom: Animalia
- Phylum: Arthropoda
- Class: Insecta
- Order: Lepidoptera
- Superfamily: Noctuoidea
- Family: Erebidae
- Genus: Catocala
- Species: C. paki

Binomial name
- Catocala paki Kishida, 1981

Species of moth

Catocala paki is a moth in the family Erebidae first described by Yasunori Kishida in 1981. It is found in Korea.
