= Catocala stamensis =

Scientific classification
- Kingdom: Animalia
- Phylum: Arthropoda
- Class: Insecta
- Order: Lepidoptera
- Superfamily: Noctuoidea
- Family: Erebidae
- Genus: Catocala
- Species: C. stamensis

Binomial name
- Catocala stamensis Kishida & Suzuki, 2002

Species of moth

Catocala stamensis is a moth in the family Erebidae. It is found in Thailand.
