= Catocala weigerti =

Scientific classification
- Kingdom: Animalia
- Phylum: Arthropoda
- Class: Insecta
- Order: Lepidoptera
- Superfamily: Noctuoidea
- Family: Erebidae
- Genus: Catocala
- Species: C. weigerti

Binomial name
- Catocala weigerti Hacker, 1999

Species of moth

Catocala weigerti is a moth in the family Erebidae. It is found in Turkey.
