= List of moths of Canada (Arctiinae) =

Partial list of Canadian moths

Moths of subfamily Arctiinae found in Canada generally fall into the tribes Arctiina and Lithosiini. This list also acts as an index to the species articles and forms part of the full List of moths of Canada.

The abbreviation after the species name indicates the Canadian provinces or territories where the species can be found.

- Western Canada
  - BC = British Columbia
  - AB = Alberta
  - SK = Saskatchewan
  - MB = Manitoba
  - YT = Yukon
  - NT = Northwest Territories
  - NU = Nunavut
- Eastern Canada
  - ON = Ontario
  - QC = Quebec
  - NB = New Brunswick
  - NS = Nova Scotia
  - PE = Prince Edward Island
  - NF = Newfoundland
  - LB = Labrador

== Tribe Arctiina ==
- Acerbia alpina (Quensel, 1802) -YT, NT
- Arctia brachyptera Troubridge & Lafontaine, 2000 -YT
- Apantesis nais (Drury, 1773) -ON, QC, NS
- Apantesis phalerata (Harris, 1841) -ON, QC
- Arctia caja (Linnaeus, 1758) -BC, AB, SK, ON, QC, NB, NS, NF
- Arctia opulenta (Edwards, 1881) -BC, MB, YT, NT
- Estigmene acrea (Drury, 1773) -BC, AB, SK, MB, NT, ON, QC, NB, NS, PE, NF
- Grammia anna (Grote, 1864) -ON
- Grammia arge (Drury, 1773) -ON, QC
- Grammia blakei (Grote, 1865) -AB, SK, MB, YT
- Grammia celia (Saunders, 1863) -BC, AB, SK, MB, YT, NT, ON, QC, NS
- Grammia complicata (Walker, 1865) -BC
- Grammia doris (Boisduval, 1869) -BC, AB, SK, MB, ON, QC, NB, NS
- Grammia elongata (Stretch, 1885) -BC, AB
- Grammia figurata (Drury, 1773) -ON, QC
- Grammia gibsoni (McDunnough, 1937) -AB, SK, MB
- Grammia nevadensis (Grote & Robinson, 1866) -BC
- Grammia obliterata (Stretch, 1885) -AB, SK, MB, NT
- Grammia ornata (Packard, 1864) -BC
- Grammia parthenice (Kirby, 1837) -BC, AB, SK, MB, ON, QC, NB, NS, NF
- Grammia philipiana Ferguson, 1985 -YT
- Grammia phyllira (Drury, 1773) -AB, SK, ON, QC
- Grammia quenseli (Paykull, 1793) -BC, MB, YT, NT, QC, NF
- Grammia superba (Stretch, 1873) -BC, AB, YT
- Grammia virgo (Linnaeus, 1758) -BC, AB, SK, MB, ON, QC, NB, NS, PE, NF
- Grammia virguncula (Kirby, 1837) -AB, SK, MB, YT, ON, QC, NB, NS, NF
- Grammia williamsii (Dodge, 1871) -BC, AB, SK, MB, NT, ON, QC, NB
- Holoarctia sordida (McDunnough, 1921) -BC, AB
- Holomelina aurantiaca (Hübner, [1831]) -SK, MB, NT, ON, QC, NB, NS
- Holomelina ferruginosa (Walker, 1854) -BC, AB, SK, MB, ON, QC, NB, NS
- Holomelina fragilis (Strecker, 1878) -BC
- Holomelina immaculata (Reakirt, 1864) -MB, ON, QC
- Holomelina laeta (Guérin-Méneville, [1832]) -SK, MB, ON, QC, NB, NS
- Holomelina lamae (Freeman, 1941) -AB, SK, MB, QC, NB, NS, PE
- Holomelina opella (Grote, 1863) -ON, QC
- Hypercompe permaculata (Packard, 1872) -BC, AB, SK
- Hypercompe scribonia (Stoll, 1790) -ON
- Hyphantria cunea (Drury, 1773) -BC, AB, SK, MB, ON, QC, NB, NS, PE, NF
- Leptarctia californiae (Walker, 1855) -BC
- Neoarctia beanii (Neumoegen, 1891) -BC, AB
- Neoarctia brucei (Edwards, 1888) -BC
- Pararctia lapponica (Thunberg, 1791) -YT, NT, NU, QC
- Pararctia subnebulosa (Dyar, 1899) -YT
- Pararctia yarrowii (Stretch, 1873) -BC, AB, YT, NT
- Parasemia plantaginis (Linnaeus, 1758) -BC, AB, SK, MB, YT, NT, ON, QC
- Phragmatobia assimilans Walker, 1855 -BC, AB, SK, MB, ON, QC, NB, NS
- Phragmatobia fuliginosa (Linnaeus, 1758) -BC, AB, SK, MB, YT, NT, ON, QC, NB, NS, NF
- Phragmatobia lineata Newman & Donahue, 1966 -AB, SK, ON
- Platarctia parthenos (Harris, 1850) -BC, AB, SK, MB, YT, NT, ON, QC, NB, NS, NF
- Platyprepia virginalis (Boisduval, 1852) -BC
- Pyrrharctia isabella (Smith, 1797) -BC, AB, SK, ON, QC, NB, NS, PE, NF
- Spilosoma congrua Walker, 1855 -BC, AB, SK, MB, ON, QC, NB, NS
- Spilosoma danbyi (Neumoegen & Dyar, 1893) -BC, AB, MB
- Spilosoma dubia (Walker, 1855) -AB, SK, MB, ON, QC, NB, NS, PE
- Spilosoma latipennis Stretch, 1872 -ON, QC, NB
- Spilosoma pteridis Edwards, 1874 -BC, AB, SK
- Spilosoma vagans (Boisduval, 1852) -BC, AB
- Spilosoma virginica (Fabricius, 1798) -BC, AB, SK, MB, ON, QC, NB, NS, PE, NF
- Dodia albertae Dyar, 1901 -AB, SK, MB, YT, NT, QC
- Dodia kononenkoi Tshistjakov & Lafontaine, 1984 -YT
- Dodia verticalis Lafontaine & Troubridge, 2000 -YT
- Haploa clymene (Brown, 1776) -ON, QC, NB
- Haploa confusa (Lyman, 1887) -SK, MB, ON, QC, NB
- Haploa contigua (Walker, 1855) -ON, QC
- Haploa lecontei (Guérin-Méneville, 1832) -AB, SK, MB, ON, QC, NB, NS
- Haploa reversa (Stretch, 1885) -ON
- Tyria jacobaeae (Linnaeus, 1758) -BC, QC, NB, NS
- Utetheisa bella (Linnaeus, 1758) -ON, QC, NS
- Cisseps fulvicollis (Hübner, [1818]) -BC, AB, SK, MB, NT, ON, QC, NB, NS
- Ctenucha virginica (Charpentier, 1830) -BC, AB, SK, MB, ON, QC, NS, PE, NF
- Gnophaela vermiculata (Grote, 1864) -BC, AB, SK, MB
- Cycnia oregonensis (Stretch, 1873) -BC, AB, SK, MB, ON, QC, NS
- Cycnia tenera Hübner, 1818 -BC, AB, SK, MB, ON, QC, NB, NS
- Euchaetes egle (Drury, 1773) -ON, QC
- Halysidota harrisii Walsh, 1864 -ON
- Halysidota tessellaris (Smith, 1797) -SK, MB, ON, QC, NB, NS, PE
- Lophocampa argentata (Packard, 1864) -BC
- Lophocampa caryae Harris, 1841 -ON, QC, NS
- Lophocampa maculata Harris, 1841 -BC, AB, SK, MB, ON, QC, NB, NS, NF
- Lophocampa roseata (Walker, 1866) -BC
- Pygarctia spraguei (Grote, 1875) -MB

== Tribe Lithosiini ==
- Acsala anomala Benjamin, 1935 -YT, NT
- Bruceia pulverina Neumoegen, 1893 -BC
- Cisthene plumbea Stretch, 1885 -ON
- Clemensia albata Packard, 1864 -BC, AB, SK, MB, ON, QC, NB, NS
- Crambidia casta (Packard, 1869) -BC, AB, SK, YT, ON, QC, NS
- Crambidia cephalica (Grotes & Robinson, 1870) -AB
- Crambidia impura Barnes & McDunnough, 1913 -BC, AB, MB, YT
- Crambidia pallida Packard, 1864 -MB, ON, QC, NB, NS
- Crambidia pura Barnes & McDunnough, 1913 -ON
- Eilema bicolor (Grote, 1864) -BC, AB, SK, MB, YT, NT, ON, QC, NB, NS, NF
- Hypoprepia fucosa Hübner, [1831] -MB, ON, QC, NB, NS
- Hypoprepia miniata (Kirby, 1837) -BC, AB, SK, MB, ON, QC, NS
- Lycomorpha pholus (Drury, 1773) -AB, SK, ON, QC, NB, NS
