= Apantesis franconia =

Scientific classification
- Kingdom: Animalia
- Phylum: Arthropoda
- Class: Insecta
- Order: Lepidoptera
- Superfamily: Noctuoidea
- Family: Erebidae
- Subfamily: Arctiinae
- Genus: Apantesis
- Species: A. franconia

Binomial name
- Apantesis franconia (H. Edwards, 1888)

Synonyms
- Grammia franconia (H. Edwards, 1888); Arctia franconia H. Edwards, 1888

Species of moth

Apantesis franconia is a moth of the family Erebidae. It was described by Henry Edwards in 1888. It is found in northeastern North America. The habitat consists of dry, rocky, or sandy areas, including pine barrens.

The length of the forewings is 14.5 mm. Adults are on wing from mid-May to late June.

== Taxonomy ==
This species was formerly a member of the genus Grammia, but was moved to Apantesis along with the other species of the genera Grammia, Holarctia, and Notarctia. It was previously considered a form of what is now Apantesis figurata.
