= Apantesis arizoniensis =

Scientific classification
- Kingdom: Animalia
- Phylum: Arthropoda
- Class: Insecta
- Order: Lepidoptera
- Superfamily: Noctuoidea
- Family: Erebidae
- Subfamily: Arctiinae
- Genus: Apantesis
- Species: A. arizoniensis

Binomial name
- Apantesis arizoniensis (Stretch, [1874])

Synonyms
- Notarctia arizoniensis (Stretch, 1874); Arctia arizoniensis Stretch, 1874

Species of moth

Apantesis arizoniensis is a moth of the family Erebidae. It was described by Robert Harper Stretch (1837–1926) in 1874. It is found from the southwestern United States to Colombia. In the United States, it has been recorded from California, east to western Texas and north to western Colorado and western Wyoming.

The length of the forewings is 16–22 mm. The hindwings are pale to dark pink. Adults are on wing in early June and late August, probably in two generations per year.

The larvae probably feed on various herbaceous plants.

== Taxonomy ==
This species was formerly a member of the genus Notarctia, but was moved to Apantesis along with the other species of the genera Grammia, Holarctia, and Notarctia. The species was also formerly treated as a synonym of Notarctia proxima.
