= Apantesis fergusoni =

Scientific classification
- Kingdom: Animalia
- Phylum: Arthropoda
- Class: Insecta
- Order: Lepidoptera
- Superfamily: Noctuoidea
- Family: Erebidae
- Subfamily: Arctiinae
- Genus: Apantesis
- Species: A. fergusoni

Binomial name
- Apantesis fergusoni (Schmidt, 2009)

Synonyms
- Grammia fergusoni Schmidt, 2009

Species of moth

Apantesis fergusoni is a moth of the family Erebidae. It was described by Schmidt in 2009. It is found in the central Sierra Nevada and White Mountains of California. The habitat consists of subalpine and alpine areas.

The length of the forewings is 14.4 mm for males and 17.7 mm for females. Adults are on wing from mid July to August.

This species was formerly a member of the genus Grammia, but was moved to Apantesis along with the other species of the genera Grammia, Holarctia, and Notarctia.

== Etymology ==
The species is named in honour of Douglas C. Ferguson.
