= Apantesis eureka =

Scientific classification
- Kingdom: Animalia
- Phylum: Arthropoda
- Class: Insecta
- Order: Lepidoptera
- Superfamily: Noctuoidea
- Family: Erebidae
- Subfamily: Arctiinae
- Genus: Apantesis
- Species: A. eureka

Binomial name
- Apantesis eureka (Ferguson & Schmidt, 2007)

Synonyms
- Grammia eureka Ferguson & Schmidt, 2007

Species of moth

Apantesis eureka is a moth of the family Erebidae. It was described by Douglas C. Ferguson and B. Christian Schmidt in 2007. It has been found in the United States along the edges of the Great Basin in central Utah and in southwestern Idaho.

The length of the forewings is about 16.9 mm. Adults are on wing from late April to mid-May.

This species was formerly a member of the genus Grammia, but was moved to Apantesis along with the other species of the genera Grammia, Holarctia, and Notarctia.
