= Apantesis brillians =

Scientific classification
- Kingdom: Animalia
- Phylum: Arthropoda
- Class: Insecta
- Order: Lepidoptera
- Superfamily: Noctuoidea
- Family: Erebidae
- Subfamily: Arctiinae
- Genus: Apantesis
- Species: A. brillians

Binomial name
- Apantesis brillians (Schmidt, 2009)

Synonyms
- Grammia brillians Schmidt, 2009

Species of moth

Apantesis brillians is a moth of the family Erebidae. It was described by Schmidt in 2009. It is found in Bryce Canyon National Park in Utah.

The length of the forewings is about 16.1 mm. Adults have been recorded on wing in July.

This species was formerly a member of the genus Grammia, but was moved to Apantesis along with the other species of the genera Grammia, Holarctia, and Notarctia.
