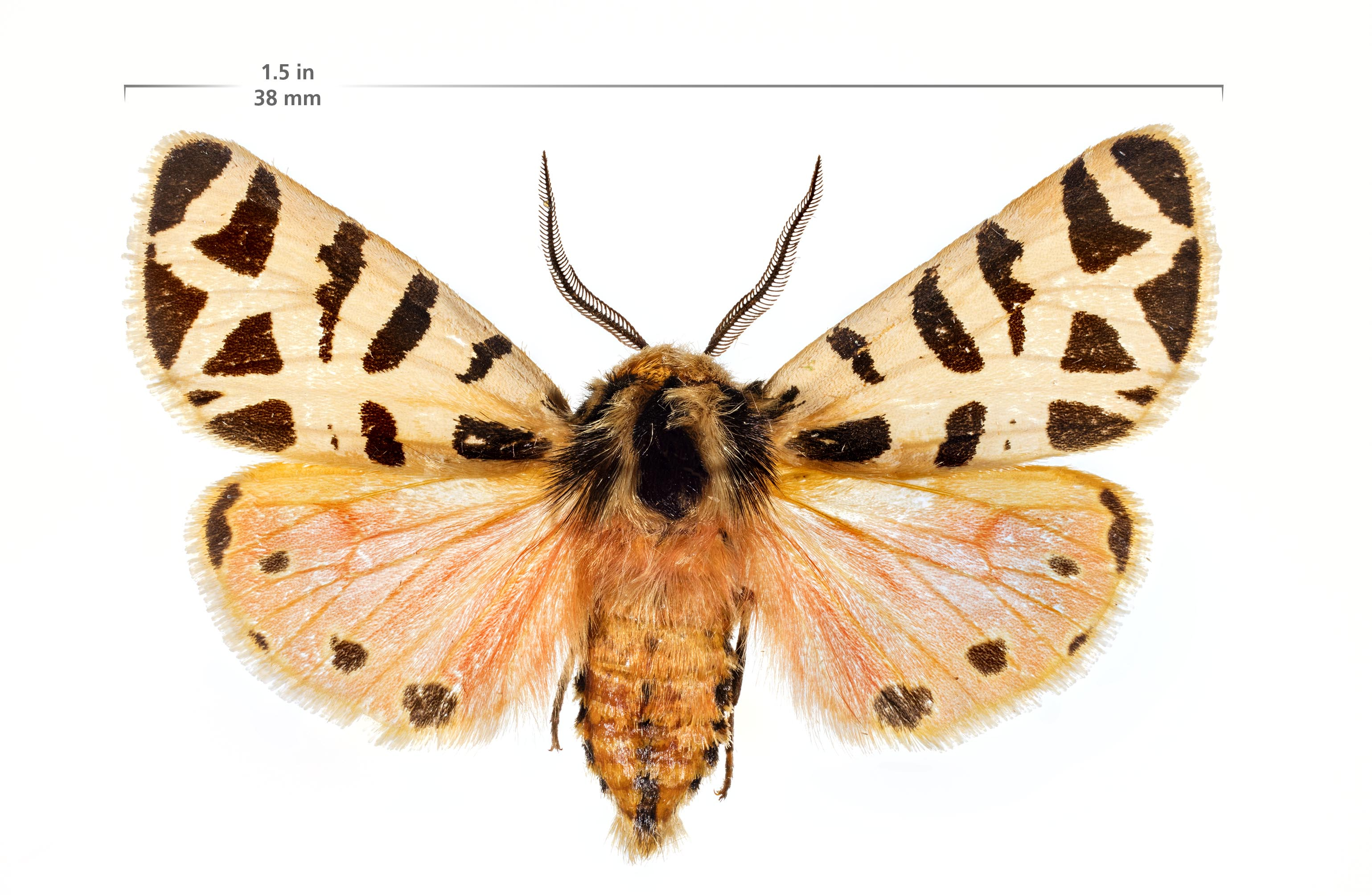

Scientific classification
- Kingdom: Animalia
- Phylum: Arthropoda
- Class: Insecta
- Order: Lepidoptera
- Superfamily: Noctuoidea
- Family: Erebidae
- Subfamily: Arctiinae
- Genus: Apantesis
- Species: A. nevadensis

Binomial name
- Apantesis nevadensis (Grote & Robinson, 1866)

Synonyms
- Grammia nevadensis (Grote & Robinson, 1866); Arctia nevadensis Grote & Robinson, 1866; Arctia geneura Stretch, 1878; Apantesis gibsoni McDunnough, 1937; Arctia superba Stretch, 1873

= Apantesis nevadensis =

Nevada tiger moth

Species of moth

Apantesis nevadensis, the Nevada tiger moth, is a moth of the family Erebidae. It was described by Augustus Radcliffe Grote and Coleman Townsend Robinson in 1866. It is found in the Pacific Northwest of North America, as well as the inter mountain region and the Rocky Mountain states. In Canada, it is found in Alberta and southern Saskatchewan and Manitoba. The habitat consists of deserts, juniper woodlands and open sagebrush range-lands, and as open forests.

The length of the forewings is 15–18 millimetres (0.59–0.71 in).

The larvae feed on various herbaceous plants, including Lupinus species and Viola beckwithii.

This species was formerly a member of the genus Grammia, but was moved to Apantesis along with the other species of the genera Grammia, Holarctia, and Notarctia.

== Subspecies ==
- Apantesis nevadensis nevadensis (Rocky Mountains to the Pacific)
- Apantesis nevadensis geneura (Stretch, 1878)
- Apantesis nevadensis gibsoni (McDunnough, 1937)
- Apantesis nevadensis superba (Stretch, 1873) (British Columbia and the Washington Cascades)
- Apantesis nevadensis vivida B. C. Schmidt, 2009 (Alberta and the Peace River)
