= Apantesis ursina =

Scientific classification
- Kingdom: Animalia
- Phylum: Arthropoda
- Class: Insecta
- Order: Lepidoptera
- Superfamily: Noctuoidea
- Family: Erebidae
- Subfamily: Arctiinae
- Genus: Apantesis
- Species: A. ursina

Binomial name
- Apantesis ursina (Schmidt, 2009)

Synonyms
- Grammia ursina Schmidt, 2009

Species of moth

Apantesis ursina is a moth of the family Erebidae. It was described by Schmidt in 2009. It is found on the Channel Islands off the coast of southern California and in mainland south-western California from Kern County south to San Diego County. It is probably also present in Baja California.

The length of the forewings is 15.3 mm for males and 16.7 mm for females. The ground colour of the forewings is dark brown with buff to yellowish-buff bands. The hindwings are pale pink to orange-pink with a black pattern. Adults are generally on wing from mid September to early October, but there are some records from mid August to early February. There is probably one generation per year.

This species was formerly a member of the genus Grammia, but was moved to Apantesis along with the other species of the genera Grammia, Holarctia, and Notarctia.
