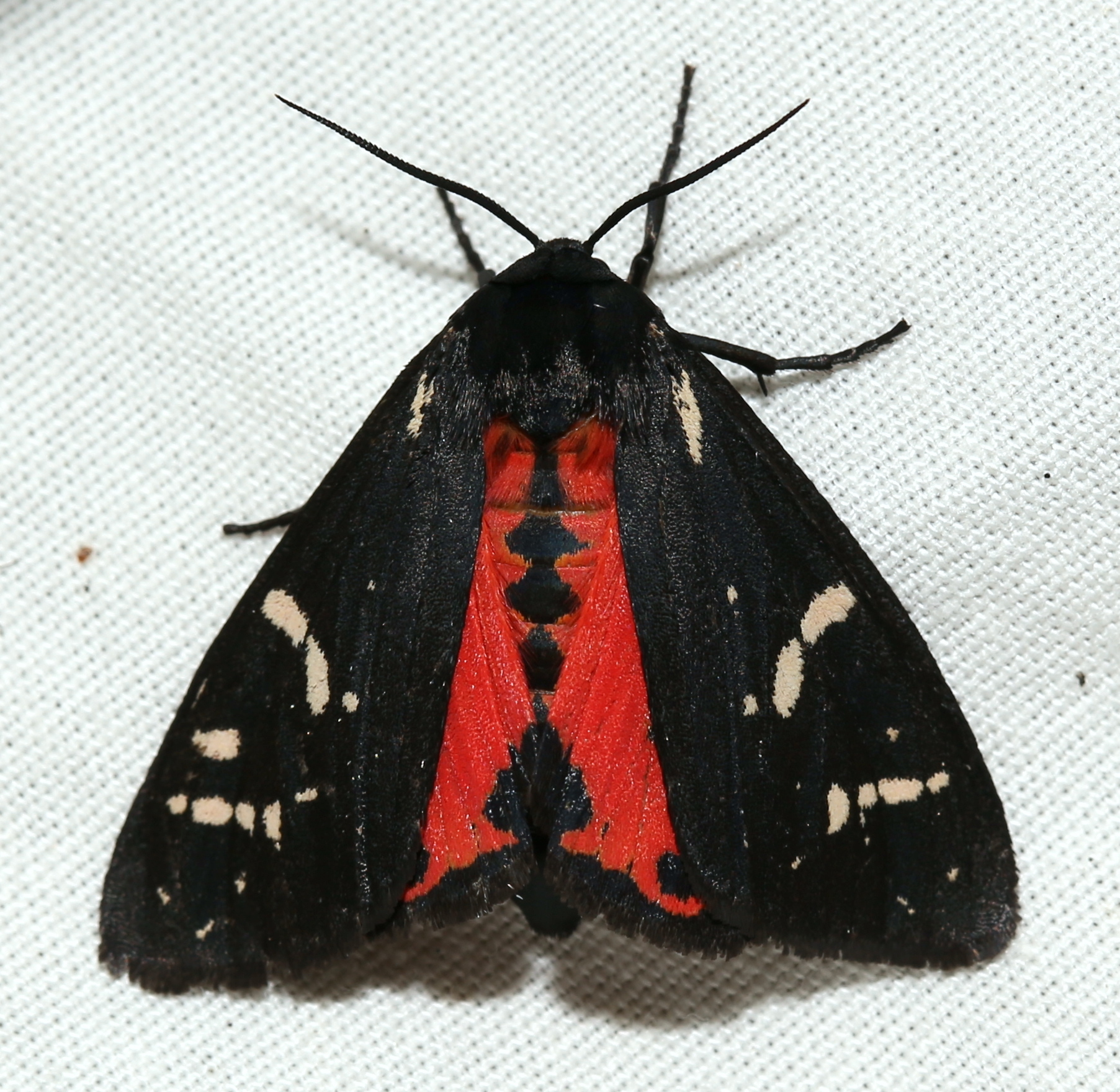

Scientific classification
- Kingdom: Animalia
- Phylum: Arthropoda
- Class: Insecta
- Order: Lepidoptera
- Superfamily: Noctuoidea
- Family: Erebidae
- Subfamily: Arctiinae
- Genus: Apantesis
- Species: A. placentia

Binomial name
- Apantesis placentia (J. E. Smith, 1797)

Synonyms
- Grammia placentia (J. E. Smith, 1797); Phalaena placentia J. E. Smith, 1797; Arctia flammea Neumögen, 1881

= Apantesis placentia =

Species of moth

Apantesis placentia, the placentia tiger moth, is a moth of the family Erebidae. It was described by James Edward Smith in 1797. It is found in the south-eastern United States, from New Jersey to Florida. The habitat consists of dry, sandy open wooded areas, primarily pine barrens.

The length of the forewings is 19.6 mm. Adults are on wing from March to October in at least two generations per year.

The larvae feed on Plantago species.

This species was formerly a member of the genus Grammia, but was moved to Apantesis along with the other species of the genera Grammia, Holarctia, and Notarctia.
