= Apantesis behrii =

Scientific classification
- Domain: Eukaryota
- Kingdom: Animalia
- Phylum: Arthropoda
- Class: Insecta
- Order: Lepidoptera
- Superfamily: Noctuoidea
- Family: Erebidae
- Subfamily: Arctiinae
- Genus: Apantesis
- Species: A. behrii

Binomial name
- Apantesis behrii (Stretch, 1872)

Synonyms
- Grammia behrii (Stretch, 1872); Arctia behrii Stretch, 1872; Arctia shastaensis French, 1889

Species of moth

Apantesis behrii is a moth of the family Erebidae. It was described by Stretch in 1872. It is found from Oregon south to California. It is most common in the Siskiyou and Sierra Nevada ranges. The habitat consists of dry lithosol flood plains and balds in the mountains.

The moth is about 34 mm. Adults are on wing from early August to late September.

The larvae feed on Lotus humistratus and Amsinckia species.

This species was formerly a member of the genus Grammia, but was moved to Apantesis along with the other species of the genera Grammia, Holarctia, and Notarctia.
