= Apantesis yavapai =

Scientific classification
- Kingdom: Animalia
- Phylum: Arthropoda
- Class: Insecta
- Order: Lepidoptera
- Superfamily: Noctuoidea
- Family: Erebidae
- Subfamily: Arctiinae
- Genus: Apantesis
- Species: A. yavapai

Binomial name
- Apantesis yavapai (Schmidt, 2009)

Synonyms
- Grammia yavapai Schmidt, 2009

Species of moth

Apantesis yavapai is a moth of the subfamily Arctiinae. It was described by Schmidt in 2009. It is only found in the San Francisco volcanic field in Coconino County, Arizona.

The length of the forewings is 14.4 mm. Adults have been recorded on wing from late June to early July.

This species was formerly a member of the genus Grammia, but was moved to Apantesis along with the other species of the genera Grammia, Holarctia, and Notarctia.

== Etymology ==
The species is named after the indigenous tribe of central Arizona.
