= Apantesis allectans =

Scientific classification
- Kingdom: Animalia
- Phylum: Arthropoda
- Clade: Pancrustacea
- Class: Insecta
- Order: Lepidoptera
- Superfamily: Noctuoidea
- Family: Erebidae
- Subfamily: Arctiinae
- Genus: Apantesis
- Species: A. allectans

Binomial name
- Apantesis allectans (Ferguson, 1985)

Species of moth

Apantesis allectans is a moth of the family Erebidae. It was described by Douglas C. Ferguson in 1985. It is found in the Mexican states of Durango and Sonora and the Chiricahua Mountains of southern Arizona in the United States. The habitat consists of open montane pine forests.

The length of the forewings is about 14 mm. Adults are on wing from early May to late June.

This species was formerly a member of the genus Grammia, but was moved to Apantesis along with the other species of the genera Grammia, Holarctia, and Notarctia.
