= Apantesis f-pallida =

Scientific classification
- Kingdom: Animalia
- Phylum: Arthropoda
- Class: Insecta
- Order: Lepidoptera
- Superfamily: Noctuoidea
- Family: Erebidae
- Subfamily: Arctiinae
- Genus: Apantesis
- Species: A. f-pallida

Binomial name
- Apantesis f-pallida (Strecker, 1878)

Synonyms
- (Grammia f-pallida) (Strecker, 1878); Arctia f-pallida Strecker, 1878; Arctia quadranotata Strecker, 1878; Apantesis quadranotata; Apantesis sociata Barnes & McDunnough, 1910; Apantesis moierra Dyar, 1914

Species of moth

Apantesis f-pallida is a moth of the family Erebidae. It was described by Strecker in 1878. It is found from south-eastern Utah and Colorado south to eastern Arizona, New Mexico and eastern Texas. It has also been recorded from west-central Nevada, and probably also occurs in Mexico.

The length of the forewings is 13.9 mm. Adults are on wing from late April to early May and again from July to August. There two generations per year in at least parts of the range.

This species was formerly a member of the genus Grammia, but was moved to Apantesis along with the other species of the genera Grammia, Holarctia, and Notarctia.
