= Apantesis edwardsii =

Scientific classification
- Kingdom: Animalia
- Phylum: Arthropoda
- Class: Insecta
- Order: Lepidoptera
- Superfamily: Noctuoidea
- Family: Erebidae
- Subfamily: Arctiinae
- Genus: Apantesis
- Species: A. edwardsii

Binomial name
- Apantesis edwardsii (Stretch, 1872)

Synonyms
- Grammia edwardsii (Stretch, 1872); Arctia edwardsii Stretch, 1872

Species of moth

Apantesis edwardsii is a moth of the family Erebidae. It was described by Stretch in 1872. It is known only from the San Francisco area in California and Klamath County in Oregon.

The length of the forewings is 13.4 mm. Adults have been recorded on wing from May to June. A few September records possibly indicate a second generation.

This species was formerly a member of the genus Grammia, but was moved to Apantesis along with the other species of the genera Grammia, Holarctia, and Notarctia.
