= Apantesis bolanderi =

Scientific classification
- Kingdom: Animalia
- Phylum: Arthropoda
- Class: Insecta
- Order: Lepidoptera
- Superfamily: Noctuoidea
- Family: Erebidae
- Subfamily: Arctiinae
- Genus: Apantesis
- Species: A. bolanderi

Binomial name
- Apantesis bolanderi (Stretch, 1872)

Synonyms
- Grammia bolanderi (Stretch, 1872); Arctia bolanderi Stretch, 1872

Species of moth

Apantesis bolanderi is a moth of the family Erebidae. It was described by Stretch in 1872. It is only known from Mount Shasta in California.

The wingspan is about 25 millimetres (0.98 in). Adults are probably on wing in spring or early summer.

This species was formerly a member of the genus Grammia, but was moved to Apantesis along with the other species of the genera Grammia, Holarctia, and Notarctia.
