= Apantesis hewletti =

Scientific classification
- Kingdom: Animalia
- Phylum: Arthropoda
- Class: Insecta
- Order: Lepidoptera
- Superfamily: Noctuoidea
- Family: Erebidae
- Subfamily: Arctiinae
- Genus: Apantesis
- Species: A. hewletti

Binomial name
- Apantesis hewletti (Barnes & McDunnough, 1918)

Synonyms
- Grammia hewletti (Barnes & McDunnough, 1918); Apantesis ornata hewletti Barnes & McDunnough, 1918

Species of moth

Apantesis hewletti is a moth of the family Erebidae, described by William Barnes and James Halliday McDunnough in 1918. It is primarily found in southwestern California, United States.

This moth species has a wingspan of approximately 20 mm, with the forewings being black in color and adorned with pale, yellowish or pinkish-buff bands. The hindwings, on the other hand, exhibit a vibrant yellow hue, although variations ranging from orange to scarlet have been observed. The markings present on the wings are black. Adult Apantesis hewletti moths have been documented to be active in May.

Previously, this species was classified under the genus Grammia, but it was later reassigned to the genus Apantesis, which also includes the species from the genera Holarctia, Grammia, and Notarctia.
