= Apantesis favorita =

Scientific classification
- Kingdom: Animalia
- Phylum: Arthropoda
- Class: Insecta
- Order: Lepidoptera
- Superfamily: Noctuoidea
- Family: Erebidae
- Subfamily: Arctiinae
- Genus: Apantesis
- Species: A. favorita

Binomial name
- Apantesis favorita (Neumoegen, 1890)

Synonyms
- Grammia favorita (Neumoegen, 1890); Arctia favorita Neumoegen, 1890

Species of moth

Apantesis favorita is a moth of the family Erebidae. It was described by Berthold Neumoegen in 1890. It is found in the Sand Hills of Nebraska, Nevada and north-eastern Colorado. The habitat consists of prairie sand dunes.

The length of the forewings is about 17.7 millimetres (0.70 in). Adults are on wing from mid-May to mid-June.

This species was formerly a member of the genus Grammia, but was moved to Apantesis along with the other species of the genera Grammia, Holarctia, and Notarctia.
