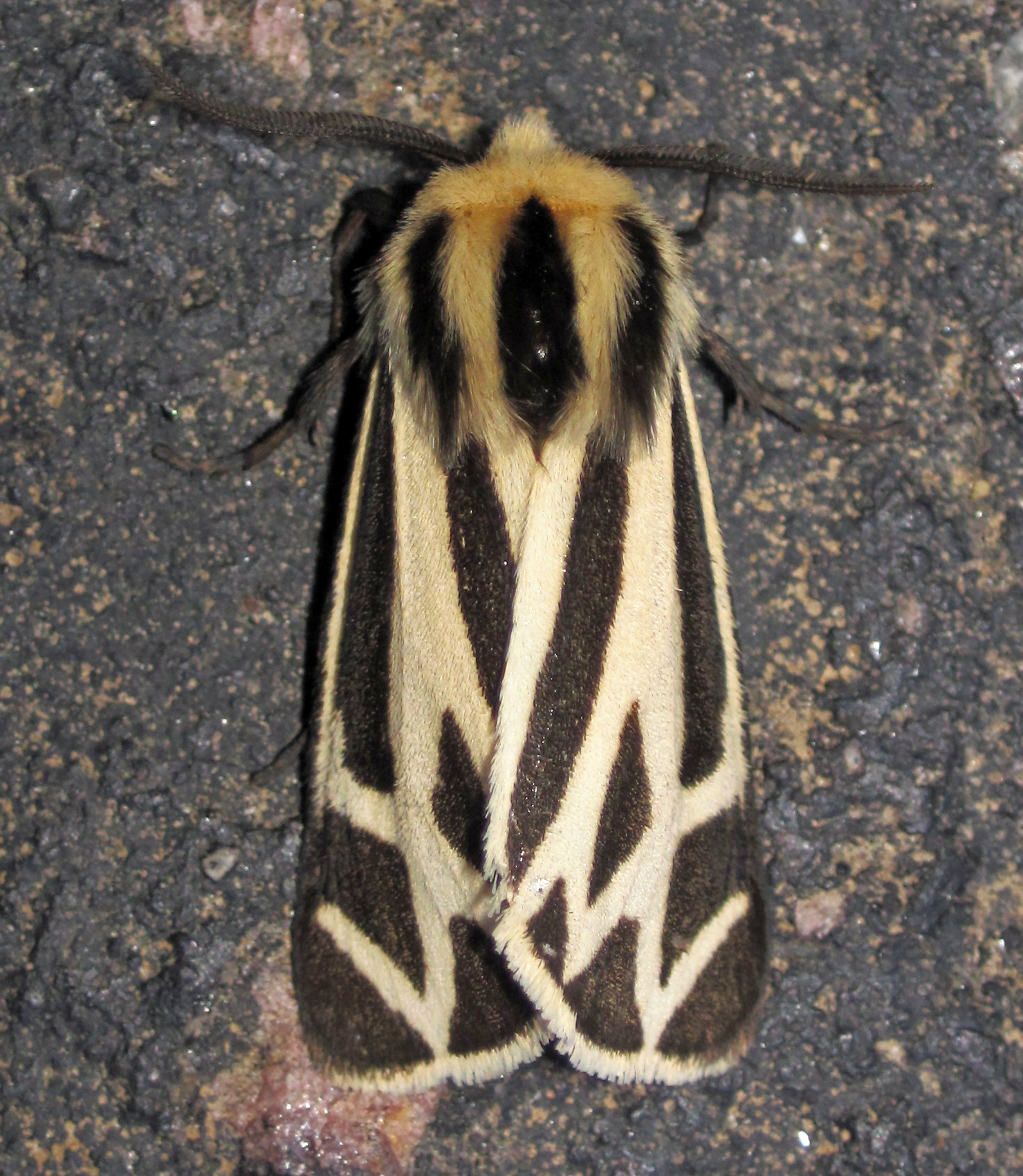

Scientific classification
- Domain: Eukaryota
- Kingdom: Animalia
- Phylum: Arthropoda
- Class: Insecta
- Order: Lepidoptera
- Superfamily: Noctuoidea
- Family: Erebidae
- Subfamily: Arctiinae
- Genus: Apantesis
- Species: A. carlotta

Binomial name
- Apantesis carlotta Ferguson, 1985

= Apantesis carlotta =

Carlotta's tiger moth

Species of moth

Apantesis carlotta, or Carlotta's tiger moth, is a moth of the family Erebidae. It was described by Douglas C. Ferguson in 1985. It is found in the US from Maine to Georgia, west to North Dakota and Texas.

The wingspan is about 30 mm (1.2 in).

The larvae have been reared on Lactuca species.
