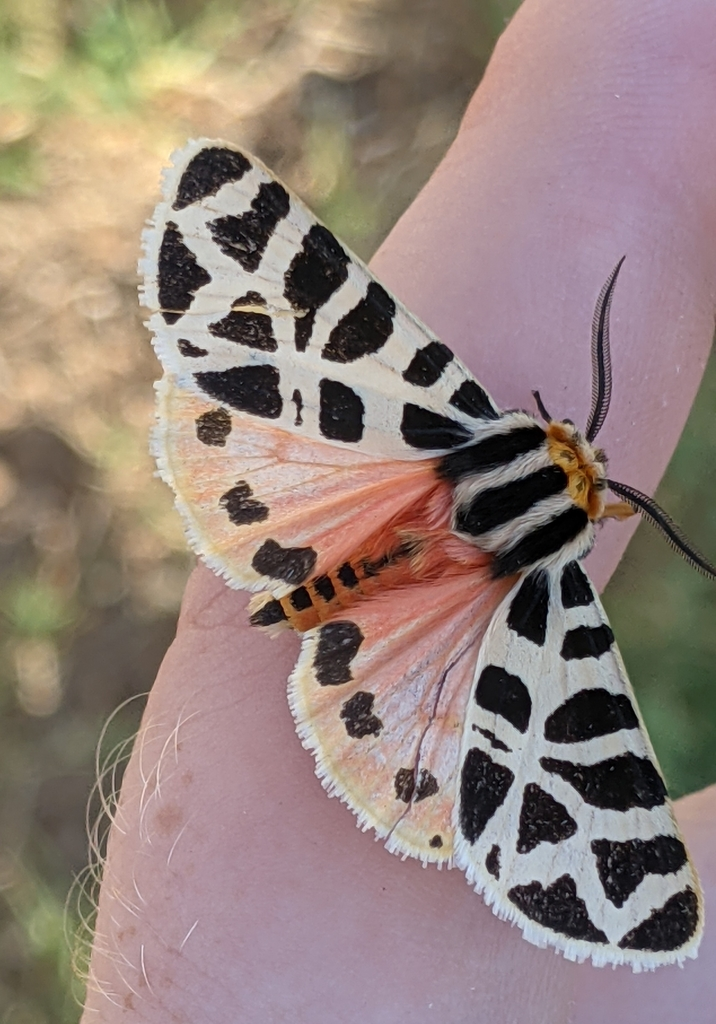
- Apantesis incorrupta on hand

Scientific classification
- Kingdom: Animalia
- Phylum: Arthropoda
- Clade: Pancrustacea
- Class: Insecta
- Order: Lepidoptera
- Superfamily: Noctuoidea
- Family: Erebidae
- Subfamily: Arctiinae
- Genus: Apantesis
- Species: A. incorrupta

Binomial name
- Apantesis incorrupta (H. Edwards, 1881)

Synonyms
- Grammia incorrupta (H. Edwards, 1881); Arctia incorrupta H. Edwards, 1881; Arctia nevadensis var. sulphurica Neumoegen, 1885; Arctia ochracea Neumoegen, 1883 (preocc. Stretch, 1872); Grammia geneura

= Apantesis incorrupta =

Species of moth

Apantesis incorrupta is an arctiine moth in the family Erebidae, described by Henry Edwards in 1881. It is found from southern Colorado and south-eastern Kansas south through Arizona, New Mexico and western Texas into Mexico and west to south-eastern California. The habitat consists of grasslands and open woodlands.

The length of the forewings is about 18.6 mm. The hindwings are pink to yellowish pink. There are two generations per year with adults on wing from late April to early October.

The larvae feed on a wide range of herbaceous, flowering plants, including Fallugia paradoxa.

Recent research has shown that the larvae of Apantesis incorrupta consume alkaloid-laden leaves that help fight off internal parasitic fly larvae. This phenomenon is said to be "the first clear demonstration of self-medication among insects".

This species was formerly a member of the genus Grammia, but was moved to Apantesis along with the other species of the genera Grammia, Holarctia, and Notarctia.
