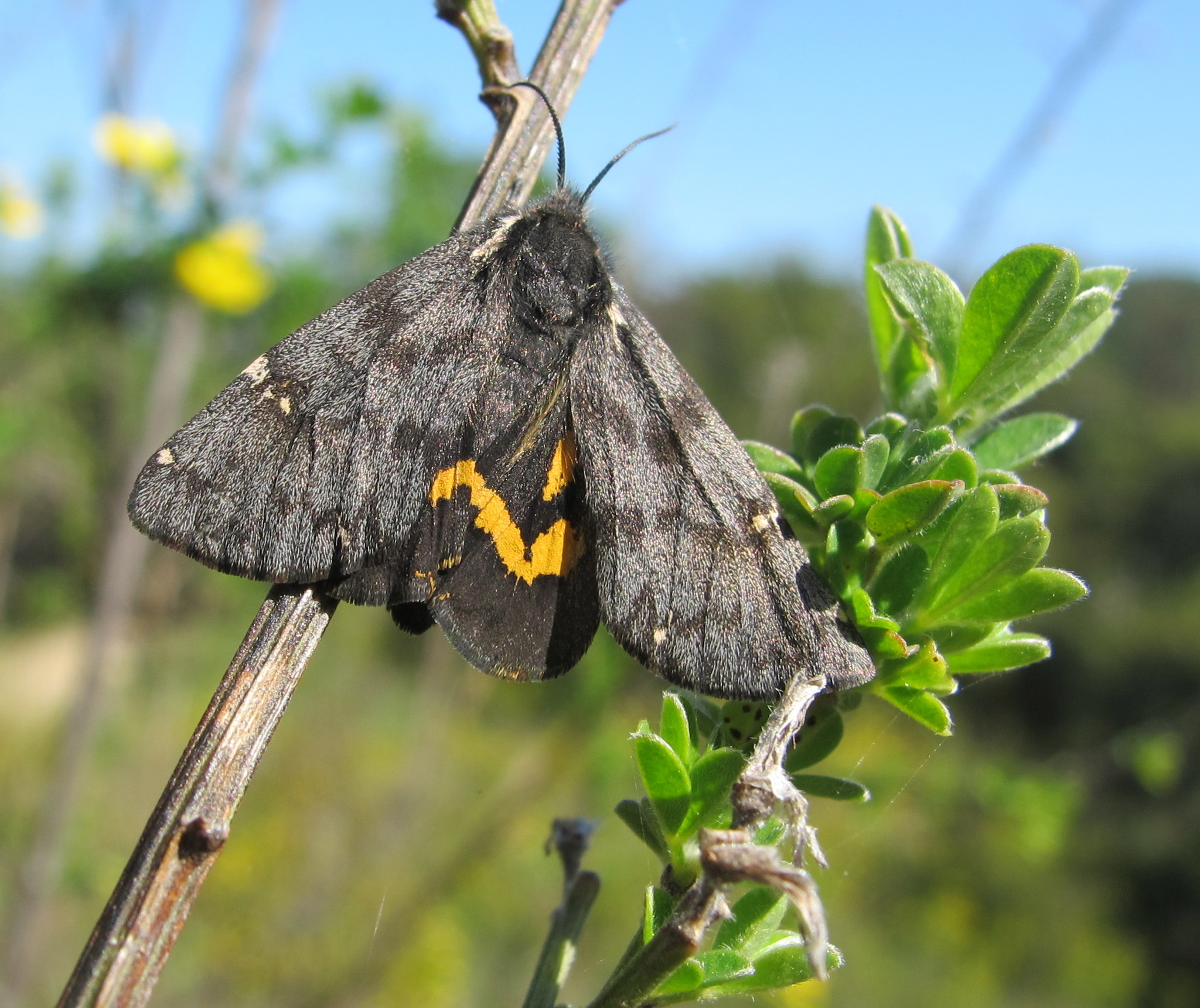

Scientific classification
- Domain: Eukaryota
- Kingdom: Animalia
- Phylum: Arthropoda
- Class: Insecta
- Order: Lepidoptera
- Superfamily: Noctuoidea
- Family: Erebidae
- Subfamily: Arctiinae
- Genus: Leptarctia; Stretch, 1872
- Species: L. californiae

Binomial name
- Leptarctia californiae (Walker, 1855)

Synonyms
- Nemeophila californiae Walker, 1855; Lithosia lena Boisduval, 1869; Lithosia adnata Boisduval, 1869; Leptarctia fulvofasciata Butler, 1881; Leptarctia wrightii French, 1889; Lithosia decia Boisduval, 1869; Leptarctia boisduvalii Butler, 1881; Leptarctia latifasciata Butler, 1881; Leptarctia albifascia French, 1889; Leptarctia occidentalis French, 1889; Leptarctia dimidiata Stretch, 1872; Leptarctia stretchii Butler, 1881

= Leptarctia =

Genus of moths

Leptarctia is a monotypic tiger moth genus in the family Erebidae described by Stretch in 1872. Its only species, Leptarctia californiae, was described by Francis Walker in 1855. It is found in western North America, from New Mexico and Colorado to California and north to British Columbia. The habitat consists of open forests, meadows and clearings in the mountains.

The length of the forewings is 12–17 mm.

== Forms ==
There are two described forms:

- Leptarctia californiae f. decia Boisduval, 1869
- Leptarctia californiae f. dimidiata Stretch, 1872

== Former species ==
- Leptarctia albiceps Rothschild, 1933
