= Apantesis cervinoides =

Scientific classification
- Kingdom: Animalia
- Phylum: Arthropoda
- Class: Insecta
- Order: Lepidoptera
- Superfamily: Noctuoidea
- Family: Erebidae
- Subfamily: Arctiinae
- Genus: Apantesis
- Species: A. cervinoides

Binomial name
- Apantesis cervinoides (Strecker, 1876)

Synonyms
- Grammia cervinoides (Strecker, 1876); Arctia cervinoides Strecker, 1876

Species of moth

Apantesis cervinoides is a moth of the family Erebidae. It was described by Strecker in 1876. It is found above treeline in the Rocky Mountains of Colorado. The habitat consists of alpine areas, including rocky slopes.

This species was formerly a member of the genus Grammia, but was moved to Apantesis along with the other species of the genera Holarctia, Grammia, and Notarctia.
