= Apantesis speciosa =

Scientific classification
- Kingdom: Animalia
- Phylum: Arthropoda
- Class: Insecta
- Order: Lepidoptera
- Superfamily: Noctuoidea
- Family: Erebidae
- Subfamily: Arctiinae
- Genus: Apantesis
- Species: A. speciosa

Binomial name
- Apantesis speciosa (Möschler, 1864)

Synonyms
- Grammia speciosa (Möschler, 1864); Arctia speciosa Möschler, 1864; Apantesis virguncula speciosa

Species of moth

Apantesis speciosa is a moth of the family Erebidae. It was described by Heinrich Benno Möschler in 1864. It is found from Labrador west to British Columbia and Alaska. The habitat consists of wetlands, bogs and sub-Arctic tundra. The species is listed as endangered in Connecticut.

The length of the forewings is 13.9–15.8 mm. Adults are on wing from late June to late July.

The larvae probably feed on various herbaceous plants.

This species was formerly a member of the genus Grammia, but was moved to Apantesis along with the other species of the genera Grammia, Holarctia, and Notarctia.

== Subspecies ==
- Apantesis speciosa speciosa
- Apantesis speciosa celineata B.C. Schmidt, 2009 (the foothills and mountains of southern and central Alberta and possibly further north in the cordilleran region of western Canada)
