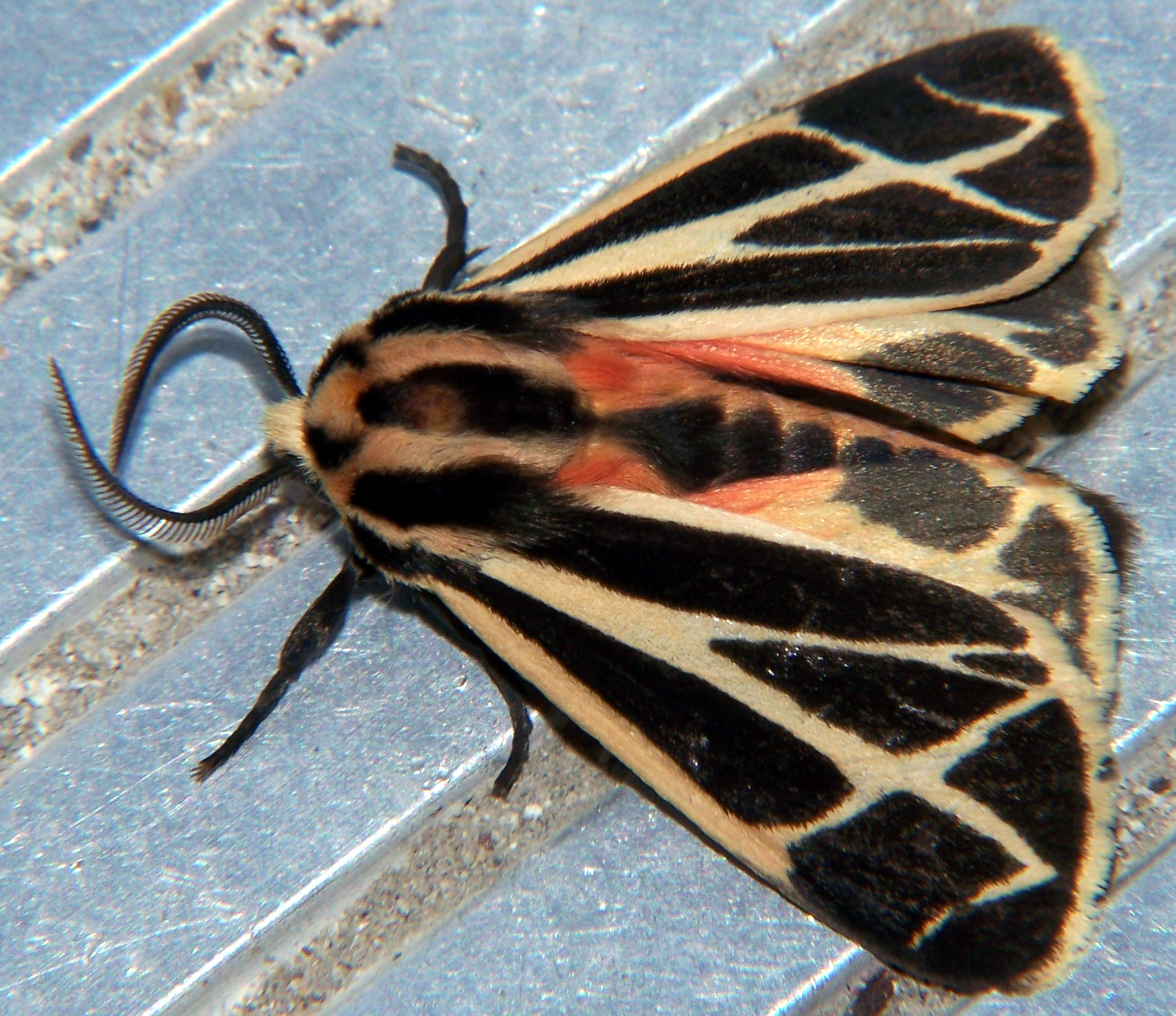
- Apantesis phalerata

Scientific classification
- Kingdom: Animalia
- Phylum: Arthropoda
- Class: Insecta
- Order: Lepidoptera
- Superfamily: Noctuoidea
- Family: Erebidae
- Subfamily: Arctiinae
- Subtribe: Arctiina
- Genus: Apantesis; Walker, 1855

= Apantesis =

Genus of moths

Apantesis is a genus of tiger moths in the family Erebidae first described by Francis Walker in 1855. They are found in North and Central America.

As a result of phylogenetic research published in 2016, the genera Grammia, Holarctia, and Notarctia have been merged with Apantesis, and their species are now members of the genus Apantesis.

== Species ==
The genus contains the following species:

- Apantesis allectans Ferguson, 1985
- Apantesis anna (Grote, 1863) – Anna tiger moth
- Apantesis arge (Drury, 1773) – arge moth
- Apantesis arizoniensis (Stretch, [1874])
- Apantesis behrii (Stretch, 1872)
- Apantesis blakei (Grote, 1864)
- Apantesis bolanderi (Stretch, 1872)
- Apantesis bowmani (Ferguson & Schmidt, 2007)
- Apantesis brillians Schmidt, 2009
- Apantesis carlotta Ferguson, 1985 – Carlotta's tiger moth
- Apantesis cervinoides (Strecker, 1876)
- Apantesis complicata (Walker, [1865])
- Apantesis doris (Boisduval, 1869) – Doris tiger moth
- Apantesis edwardsii (Stretch, 1872)
- Apantesis elongata (Stretch, 1885)
- Apantesis eureka Ferguson & Schmidt, 2007
- Apantesis f-pallida (Strecker, 1878)
- Apantesis favorita (Neumögen, 1890)
- Apantesis fergusoni Schmidt, 2009
- Apantesis figurata (Drury, 1773) – figured tiger moth
- Apantesis franconia (H. Edwards, 1888)
- Apantesis hewletti (Barnes & McDunnough, 1918)
- Apantesis incorrupta (H. Edwards, 1881)
- Apantesis margo Schmidt, 2009
- Apantesis nais (Drury, 1773) – Nais tiger moth
- Apantesis nevadensis (Grote & Robinson, 1866) – Nevada tiger moth
- Apantesis obliterata (Stretch, 1885)
- Apantesis ornata (Packard, 1864)
- Apantesis parthenice (W. Kirby, 1837) – parthenice tiger moth
- Apantesis phalerata (Harris, 1841) – harnessed tiger moth
- Apantesis philipiana Ferguson, 1985
- Apantesis phyllira (Drury, 1773) – phyllira tiger moth
- Apantesis placentia (J.E. Smith, 1797) – placentia tiger moth
- Apantesis proxima (Guérin-Méneville, [1844]) – Mexican tiger moth
- Apantesis quenseli (Paykull, 1793)
- Apantesis speciosa (Möschler, 1864)
- Apantesis ursina Schmidt, 2009
- Apantesis virgo (Linnaeus, 1758) – virgin tiger moth
- Apantesis virguncula (W. Kirby, 1837) – little virgin tiger moth
- Apantesis vittata (Fabricius, 1787) – banded tiger moth
- Apantesis williamsii (Dodge, 1871) – Williams' tiger moth
- Apantesis yavapai Schmidt, 2009
- Apantesis yukona Schmidt, 2009

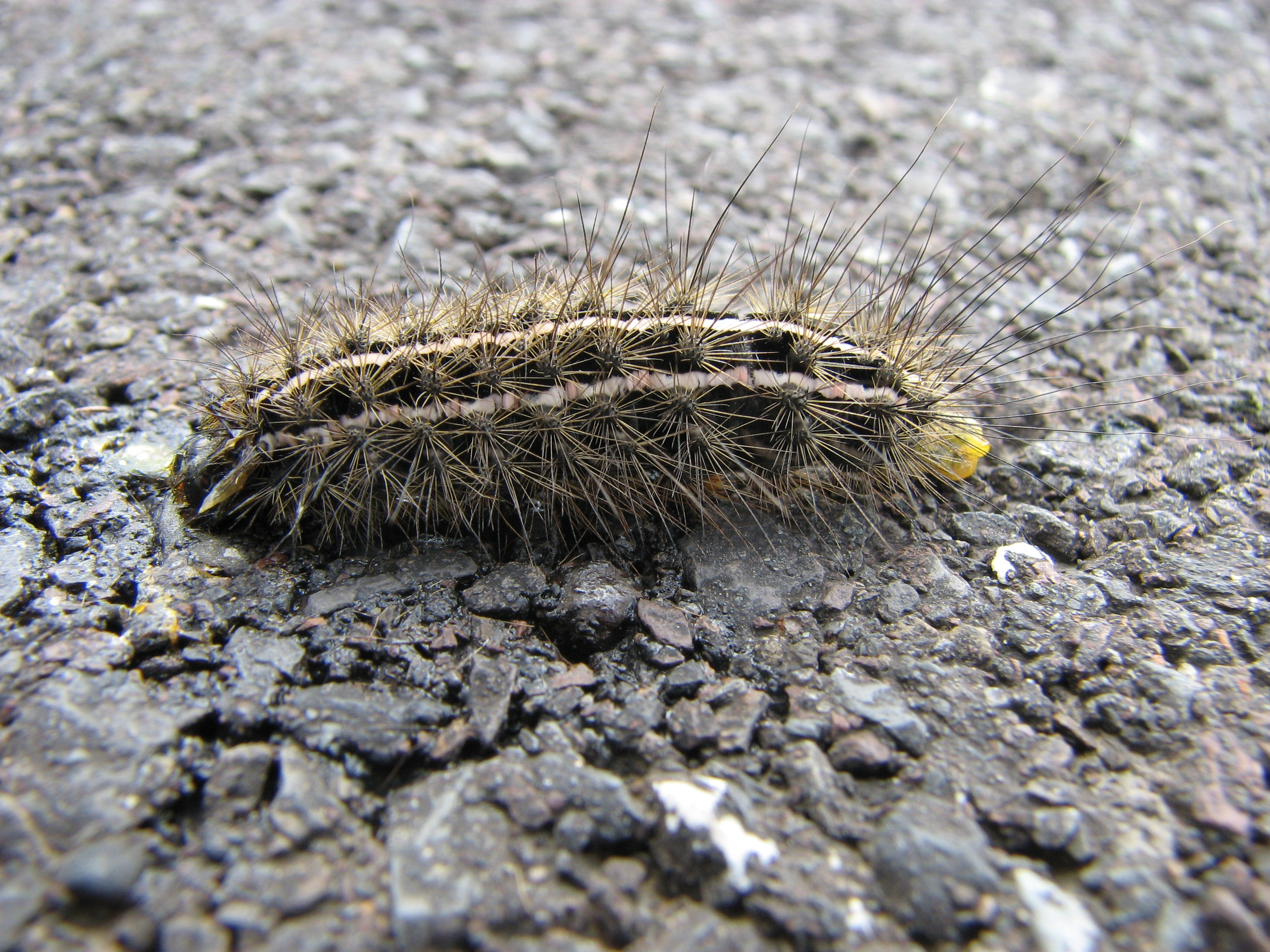
Apantesis arge, larva
