= Apantesis bowmani =

Scientific classification
- Kingdom: Animalia
- Phylum: Arthropoda
- Class: Insecta
- Order: Lepidoptera
- Superfamily: Noctuoidea
- Family: Erebidae
- Subfamily: Arctiinae
- Genus: Apantesis
- Species: A. bowmani

Binomial name
- Apantesis bowmani (Ferguson & Schmidt, 2007)

Synonyms
- Grammia bowmani Ferguson & Schmidt, 2007

Species of moth

Apantesis bowmani is a moth of the family Erebidae. It was described by Douglas C. Ferguson and B. Christian Schmidt in 2007. It is found in the United States in western Colorado and southeastern Utah. It occurs at elevations between 1,520 and 2,130 meters.

The length of the forewings is about 14.8 mm. The ground color of the forewings is dark brown to black with pale buff bands. The hindwings are rose to pale pink with a black pattern. Adults are on wing from mid-May to late July.

This species was formerly a member of the genus Grammia, but was moved to Apantesis along with the other species of the genera Grammia, Holarctia, and Notarctia.
