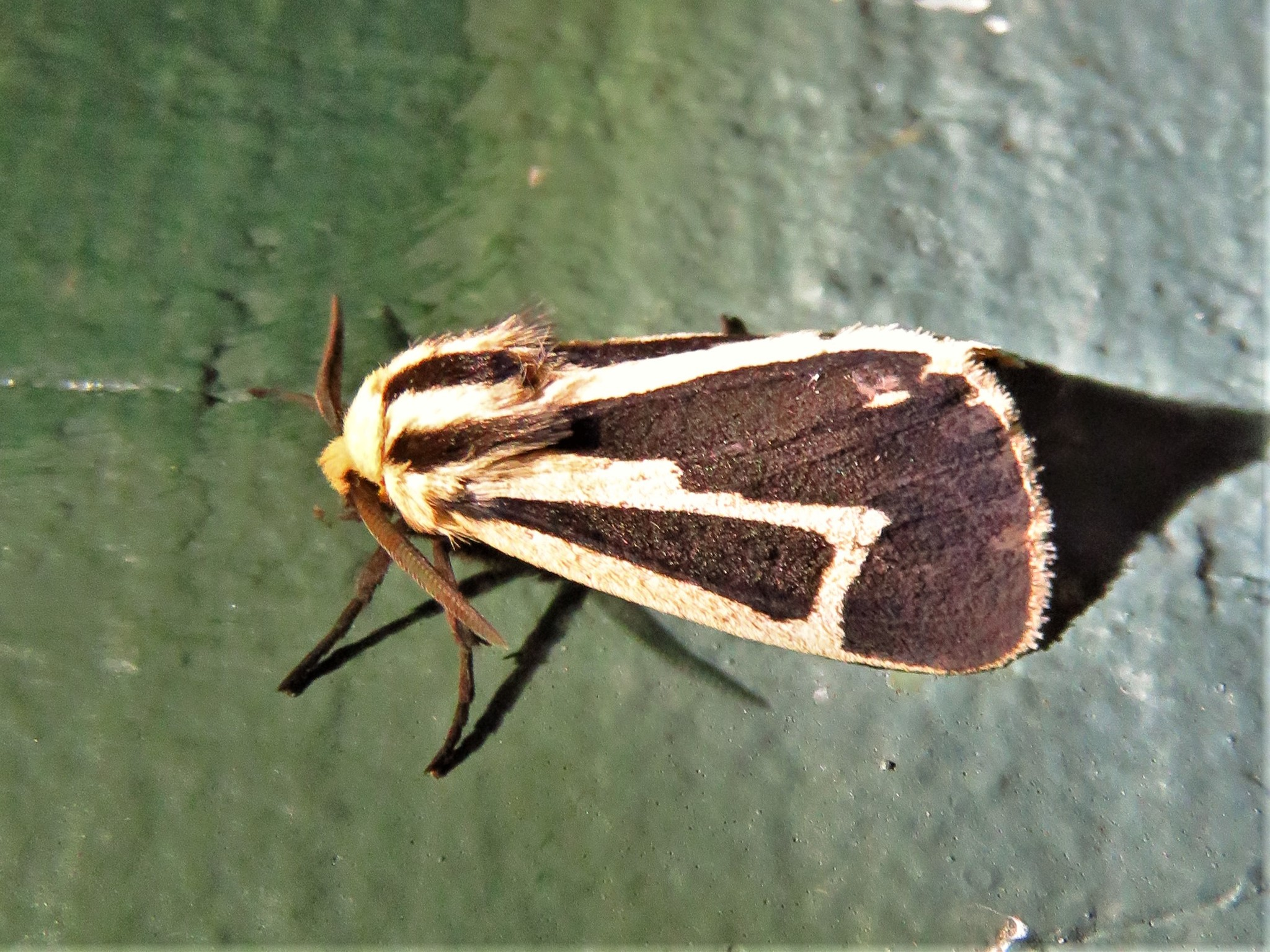

Scientific classification
- Domain: Eukaryota
- Kingdom: Animalia
- Phylum: Arthropoda
- Class: Insecta
- Order: Lepidoptera
- Superfamily: Noctuoidea
- Family: Erebidae
- Subfamily: Arctiinae
- Genus: Apantesis
- Species: A. vittata

Binomial name
- Apantesis vittata (Fabricius, 1787)

Synonyms
- Bombyx vittata Fabricius, 1787; Apantesis radians Walker, 1855; Arctia colorata Walker, 1865; Apantesis floridana Cassino, 1918; Apantesis ochracea Cassino, 1918; Apantesis nais ab. subterminalis Strand, 1919

= Apantesis vittata =

Banded tiger moth

Species of moth

Apantesis vittata, the banded tiger moth, is a moth of the family Erebidae. It was described by Johan Christian Fabricius in 1787. It is found in the United States from Maryland to Florida, west to Kentucky, and Louisiana.

The wingspan is 32–42 mm. Adults are on wing from March to October.

The larvae feed on various herbs, including dandelions.
