= Apantesis yukona =

Scientific classification
- Kingdom: Animalia
- Phylum: Arthropoda
- Class: Insecta
- Order: Lepidoptera
- Superfamily: Noctuoidea
- Family: Erebidae
- Subfamily: Arctiinae
- Genus: Apantesis
- Species: A. yukona

Binomial name
- Apantesis yukona (Schmidt, 2009)

Synonyms
- Grammia yukona Schmidt, 2009

Species of moth

Apantesis yukona is a moth of the subfamily Arctiinae. It was described by Schmidt in 2009. It is found in Yukon. The habitat consists of dry, rocky or eroding south-facing slopes.

The length of the forewings is 15.3 mm. Adults have been recorded on wing from late June to early August.

This species was formerly a member of the genus Grammia, but was moved to Apantesis along with the other species of the genera Grammia, Holarctia, and Notarctia.

== Etymology ==
The species name refers to Yukon.
