= Apantesis margo =

Scientific classification
- Kingdom: Animalia
- Phylum: Arthropoda
- Class: Insecta
- Order: Lepidoptera
- Superfamily: Noctuoidea
- Family: Erebidae
- Subfamily: Arctiinae
- Genus: Apantesis
- Species: A. margo

Binomial name
- Apantesis margo (Schmidt, 2009)

Synonyms
- Grammia margo Schmidt, 2009

Species of moth

Apantesis margo is a moth of the family Erebidae. It was described by Schmidt in 2009. It is found in grassland and transitional habitats on the northern Great Plains and Southern Rocky Mountain Front ranges, south to east-central Arizona.

The length of the forewings is 12.3 mm. The forewings are dark brown to black dorsally with pale buff bands. The hindwings are dull yellow to orange-yellow with black markings. Adults are on wing from early May to mid June.

This species was formerly a member of the genus Grammia, but was moved to Apantesis along with the other species of the genera Grammia, Holarctia, and Notarctia.

== Etymology ==
The species is named after the wife of the author.
