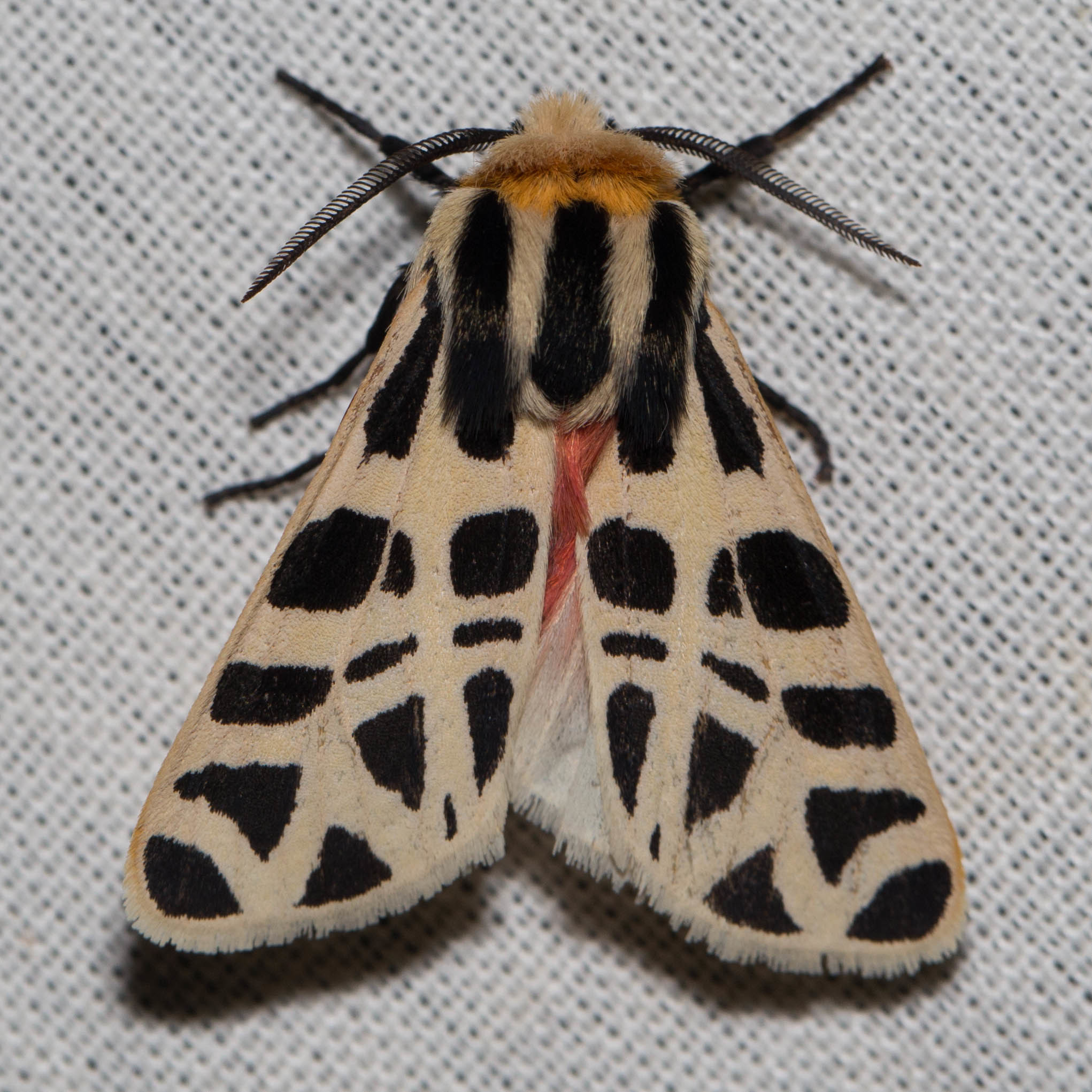
- Apantesis proxima, Channel Islands, California

Scientific classification
- Kingdom: Animalia
- Phylum: Arthropoda
- Clade: Pancrustacea
- Class: Insecta
- Order: Lepidoptera
- Superfamily: Noctuoidea
- Family: Erebidae
- Subfamily: Arctiinae
- Genus: Apantesis
- Species: A. proxima

Binomial name
- Apantesis proxima (Guérin-Méneville, [1844])

Synonyms
- Notarctia proxima Guérin-Méneville, 1844; Chelonia proxima Guérin-Méneville, [1844]; Grammia proxima; Euprepia docta Walker, 1855; Arctia mexicana Grote & Robinson, 1867; Chelonia autholea Boisduval, 1869; Apantesis mormonica Neumoegen, 1885

= Apantesis proxima =

Mexican tiger moth

Species of moth

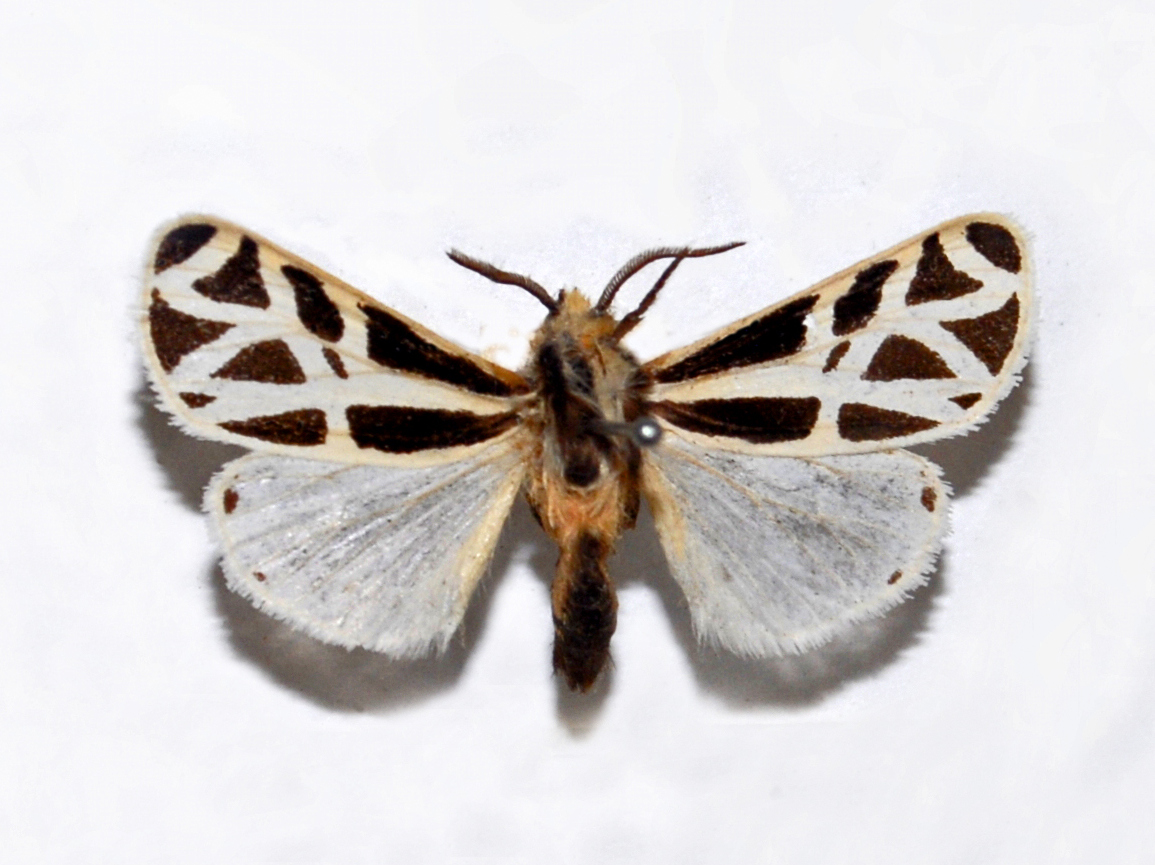
Mounted specimen

Apantesis proxima, the Mexican tiger moth, is a moth of the family Erebidae. It was described by Felix Guérin-Méneville in 1844.

Apantesis proxima was formerly a member of the genus Notarctia, which was combined with Apantesis as a result of phylogenetic and molecular analysis in 2016.

== Subspecies ==
- Apantesis proxima proxima
- Apantesis proxima mormonica (Neumoegen, 1885)

== Description ==
This species can be found in North America from south-eastern Oregon and southern Idaho to Nevada, western Utah and California, as well as in Mexico. It can also be found in Europe (Croatia).
