= Apantesis complicata =

Conservation status
- Critically Imperiled (NatureServe)

Scientific classification
- Kingdom: Animalia
- Phylum: Arthropoda
- Class: Insecta
- Order: Lepidoptera
- Superfamily: Noctuoidea
- Family: Erebidae
- Subfamily: Arctiinae
- Genus: Apantesis
- Species: A. complicata

Binomial name
- Apantesis complicata (Walker, [1865])

Synonyms
- Grammia complicata (Walker, 1865); Arctia quenselii ab. complicata Walker, [1865]; Apantesis ornata complicata

Species of moth

Apantesis complicata is a moth of the family Erebidae. It was described by Francis Walker in 1865. It is found on south-eastern Vancouver Island and several Gulf Islands of British Columbia and Washington. The habitat consists of dry Garry oak meadows and sandy beaches.

The length of the forewings is 15.7 mm. Adults are on wing from late May to mid-June.

This species was formerly a member of the genus Grammia, but was moved to Apantesis along with the other species of the genera Grammia, Holarctia, and Notarctia.
