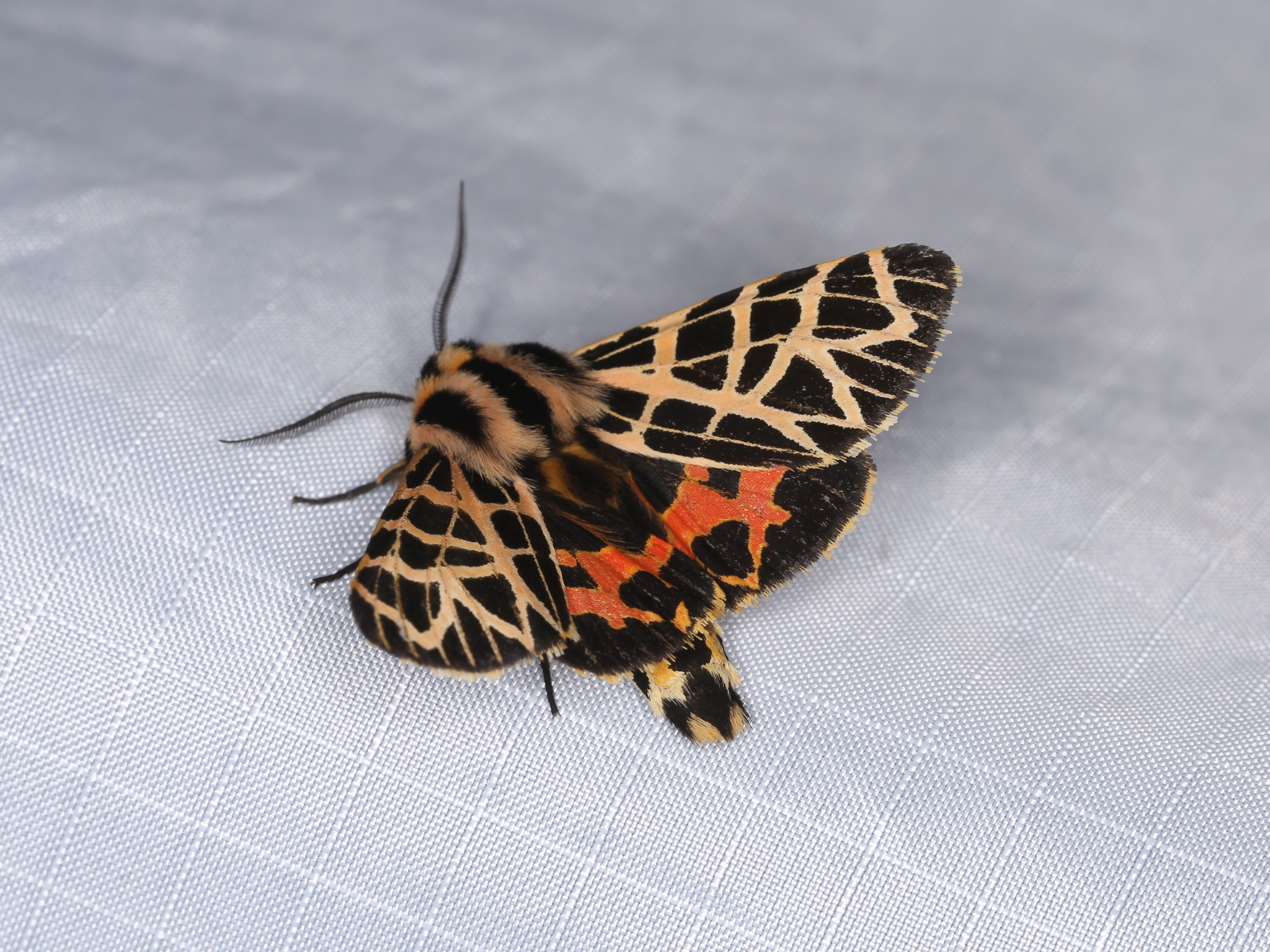

Scientific classification
- Kingdom: Animalia
- Phylum: Arthropoda
- Clade: Pancrustacea
- Class: Insecta
- Order: Lepidoptera
- Superfamily: Noctuoidea
- Family: Erebidae
- Subfamily: Arctiinae
- Genus: Apantesis
- Species: A. ornata

Binomial name
- Apantesis ornata (Packard, 1864)

Synonyms
- Grammia ornata (Packard, 1864); Callarctia ornata Packard, 1864; Apantesis ornata ab. ochracea Stretch, 1872; Arctia simplicior Butler, 1881; Arctia achaia var. barda H. Edwards, 1881; Euprepia (Cymbalophora) blakei var. perpicta Dyar, 1893; Arctia achaia var. maculosa Stretch, 1906; Arctia achaia var. rivulosa Stretch, 1906; Arctia achaia var. ochracea-rivulosa Stretch, 1906; Apantesis californica Cassino, 1917; Apantesis ornata ab. sulphuricella Strand, 1919

= Apantesis ornata =

Ornate tiger moth

Species of moth

Apantesis ornata, the ornate tiger moth or achaia moth, is a moth of the family Erebidae. It was described by Alpheus Spring Packard in 1864. It is found in western North America from southern British Columbia through the Pacific Northwest to southern California, northern Utah, and western Wyoming and Montana. It is found in a wide range of habitats, including open woodland.

This species was formerly a member of the genus Grammia, but was moved to Apantesis along with the other species of the genera Grammia, Holarctia, and Notarctia.

== Life cycle ==
The larva are generalist feeders.

Adults have a wingspan of aprox. 4.3 centimeters. The forewings are black or brown with crisscrossing yellow or yellowish-white lines. The hindwings are variable, usually black with yellow, orange or reddish-orange crisscrossing lines or black spots on an orange ground. Head is yellow. The scales of the thorax give the appearance of three black vertical strips lined in yellow. The abdomen is black and yellow.

== External links and images ==
- Moth Photography Group
- Bug Guide
- iNaturalist
- Pacific Northwest Moths
