= Apantesis obliterata =

Scientific classification
- Kingdom: Animalia
- Phylum: Arthropoda
- Class: Insecta
- Order: Lepidoptera
- Superfamily: Noctuoidea
- Family: Erebidae
- Subfamily: Arctiinae
- Genus: Apantesis
- Species: A. obliterata

Binomial name
- Apantesis obliterata (Stretch, 1885)

Synonyms
- Grammia obliterata (Stretch, 1885); Arctia obliterata Stretch, 1885; Holarctia obliterata; Arctia turbans Christoph, 1892; Grammia turbans

Species of moth

Apantesis obliterata is a moth of the family Erebidae. It was described by Richard Harper Stretch in 1885. It is found in Russia (Khakasia, eastern Sayan, southern Baikal region, Transbaikalia, Middle Amur basin, central Yakutia), Mongolia and North America (Alberta, Saskatchewan, Manitoba, the North-West Territories). The habitat consists of grasslands.

The length of the forewings is about 16 mm. Adults are on wing in late summer and early fall.

The larvae probably feed on various herbaceous plants.

This species was formerly a member of the genus Grammia, but was moved to Apantesis along with the other species of the genera Grammia, Holarctia, and Notarctia.
