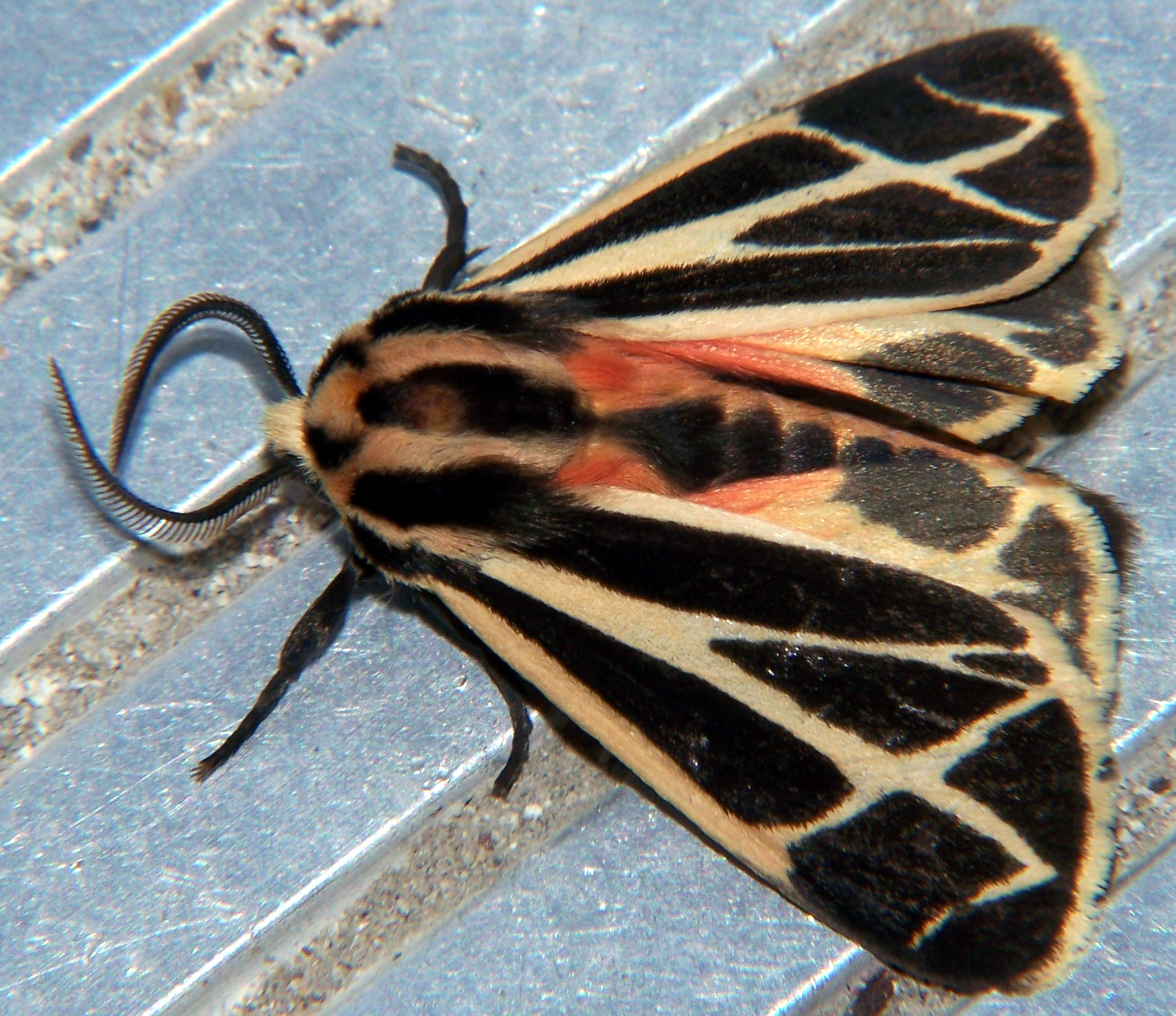

Scientific classification
- Domain: Eukaryota
- Kingdom: Animalia
- Phylum: Arthropoda
- Class: Insecta
- Order: Lepidoptera
- Superfamily: Noctuoidea
- Family: Erebidae
- Subfamily: Arctiinae
- Genus: Apantesis
- Species: A. phalerata

Binomial name
- Apantesis phalerata (Harris, 1841)

Synonyms
- Arctia phalerata Harris, 1841; Arctia phalerata var. incompleta Butler, 1881; Arctia rhoda Butler, 1881; Arctia incarnata Stretch, 1906; Arctia pulcherrima Stretch, 1906; Apantesis naidella Strand, 1919; Apantesis vittatula Strand, 1919; Apantesis rhodana Strand, 1919

= Apantesis phalerata =

Harnessed tiger moth

Species of moth

Apantesis phalerata, commonly known as the harnessed tiger moth, is a species of moth within the Erebidae family, first described by Thaddeus William Harris in 1841.

== Distribution ==
Harnessed tiger moths are indigenous to North America, with a geographical distribution that spans from Ontario, Quebec, and Maine in the north, stretching down to Florida, Texas, and South Dakota. The activity period for A. phalerata varies regionally, from April to September in the southern parts of its range, and from May to August in the northern areas.

== Description ==
Harnessed tiger moths are part of the subfamily Arctiinae, which comprises about 11,000 species of tiger moths divided across three tribes globally. Similar to cicadas, tiger moths possess tymbals on their metathorax, which they use to produce high frequency clicks. These clicks serve as a defensive mechanism against predation and as a means of communication during mating.

== Life cycle and behavior ==
Throughout its life cycle, which includes the stages of egg, larva (caterpillar), pupa, and adult, A. phalerata undergoes complete metamorphosis. As caterpillars, they feed on a variety of vegetation including grasses, garden crops, and low-growing plants such as Trifolium (clover), Spartina (cordgrass), Taraxacum (dandelion), and Plantago (plantain). The cocoon of a harnessed tiger moth is primarily made from larval hairs.

Adult A. phalerata moths have a wingspan ranging from 30 to 42 mm (1.2 to 1.7 inches) and are known for their distinctive black and orange wing patterns, which has earned them the name "tiger" moth. This coloration is a form of aposematism, a strategy used to warn predators of their unpalatability.

Despite their warning colors, harnessed tiger moths are preyed upon by bats, which rely on echolocation to hunt. The moths' vibrant colors serve as a visual deterrent, signaling to potential predators that they are distasteful. Following mating, the lifespan of a harnessed tiger moth ranges from 5 to 10 days. The lifespan and mortality are influenced by various factors, including the act of mating itself and dietary conditions.
