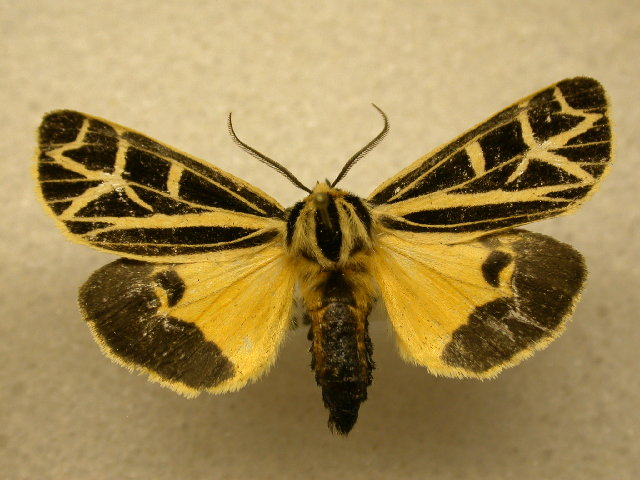

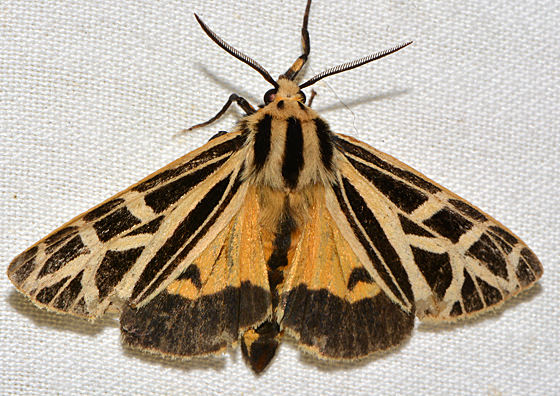

Scientific classification
- Kingdom: Animalia
- Phylum: Arthropoda
- Clade: Pancrustacea
- Class: Insecta
- Order: Lepidoptera
- Superfamily: Noctuoidea
- Family: Erebidae
- Subfamily: Arctiinae
- Genus: Apantesis
- Species: A. anna

Binomial name
- Apantesis anna (Grote, 1863)

Synonyms
- Apanntesis anna (Grote, 1863); Arctia anna Grote, 1863; Arctia persephone Grote, 1864

= Apantesis anna =

Anna tiger moth

Species of moth

Apantesis anna, the Anna tiger moth, is a moth of the family Erebidae. It was described by Augustus Radcliffe Grote in 1863. It is found from Maine to the mountains of North Carolina, west to Nebraska and Arkansas.

The wingspan is 40–53 mm (1.6–2.1 in). The forewings are black with thick and thin yellowish to cream-colored lines. Forewing pattern includes two to three pale lines extending inward from the costa. The hindwings are bright yellow with a broad black border and a black spot near the costa. Adults are on wing from May to July.

The larvae feed on a wide variety of low-growing plants, including clover and plantain.

This species was formerly a member of the genus Grammia, but was moved to Apantesis along with the other species of the genera Grammia, Holarctia, and Notarctia.
