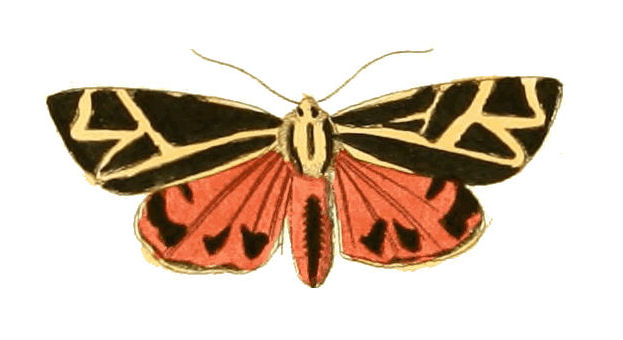

Scientific classification
- Kingdom: Animalia
- Phylum: Arthropoda
- Class: Insecta
- Order: Lepidoptera
- Superfamily: Noctuoidea
- Family: Erebidae
- Subfamily: Arctiinae
- Genus: Apantesis
- Species: A. phyllira

Binomial name
- Apantesis phyllira (Drury, 1773)

Synonyms
- Grammia phyllira (Drury, 1773); Bombyx phyllira Drury, 1773; Geometra b-ata Göze, 1781; Arctia oithona Strecker, 1878; Apantesis oithona; Arctia rectilinea French, 1879; Arctia dodgei Butler, 1881; Arctia rectilinea var. conspicua Stretch, 1906; Arctia favorita var. favoritella Strand, 1919

= Apantesis phyllira =

Phyllira tiger moth

Species of moth

Apantesis phyllira, the phyllira tiger moth, is a moth of the family Erebidae. It was described by Dru Drury in 1773. It is found in North America from Quebec and New England south to Florida and west to Texas, Colorado and Alberta. The habitat consists of dry, open woodland and grassland. The species is listed as endangered in Connecticut.

The forewings are about 17 mm long.

The larvae feed on various low-growing plants, including corn, lupine and tobacco.

This species was formerly a member of the genus Grammia, but was moved to Apantesis along with the other species of the genera Grammia, Holarctia, and Notarctia.
