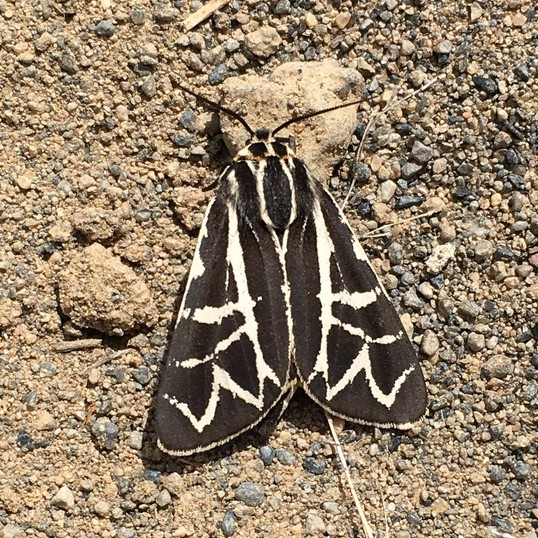

Scientific classification
- Kingdom: Animalia
- Phylum: Arthropoda
- Class: Insecta
- Order: Lepidoptera
- Superfamily: Noctuoidea
- Family: Erebidae
- Subfamily: Arctiinae
- Genus: Apantesis
- Species: A. elongata

Binomial name
- Apantesis elongata (Stretch, 1885)

Synonyms
- Grammia elongata (Stretch, 1885); Arctia elongata Stretch, 1885; Apantesis elongata; Arctia dieckii Neumögen, 1890

= Apantesis elongata =

Species of moth

Apantesis elongata is a species of moth in the family Erebidae. It was first described by Stretch in 1885. It is found in western North America from south-western British Columbia and west-central Alberta, south to Montana and Washington state. It has also been recorded from north-eastern Oregon. The habitat consists of dry, montane, and subalpine meadows.

The length of the forewings is 14.9 mm. Adults are on wing from mid May to late August.

The larvae have been recorded feeding on Claytonia lanceolata.

This species was formerly a member of the genus Grammia, but was moved to Apantesis along with the other species of the genera Grammia, Holarctia, and Notarctia.
