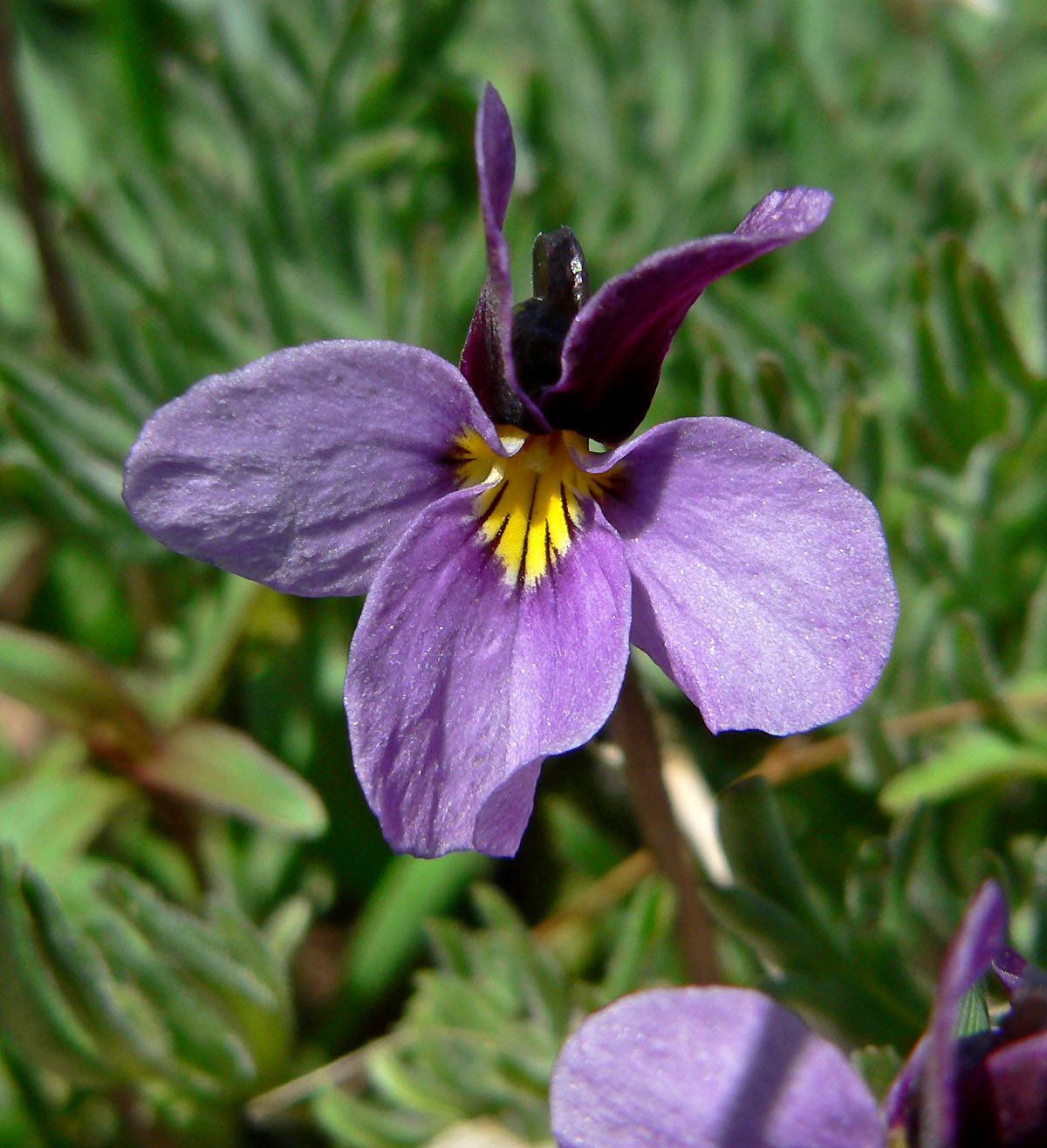

Conservation status
- Apparently Secure (NatureServe)

Scientific classification
- Kingdom: Plantae
- Clade: Tracheophytes
- Clade: Angiosperms
- Clade: Eudicots
- Clade: Rosids
- Order: Malpighiales
- Family: Violaceae
- Genus: Viola
- Species: V. beckwithii

Binomial name
- Viola beckwithii Torr. & A.Gray

= Viola beckwithii =

Species of flowering plant

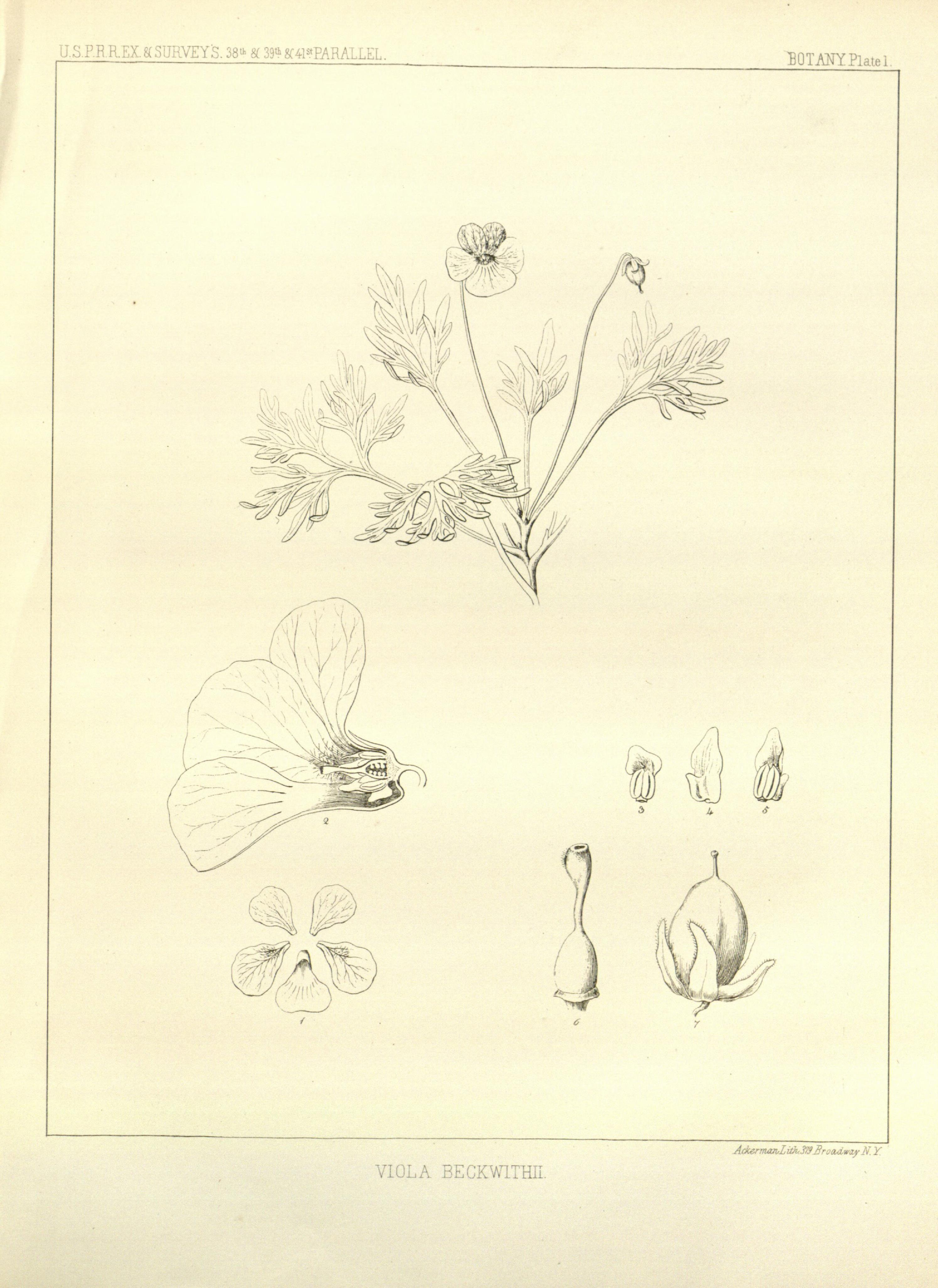
Illustration showing parts of plant.

Viola beckwithii, known commonly as the Great Basin violet, Beckwith's violet, and sagebrush pansy, is a species of violet native to the western United States. It is an early-flowering plant of sagebrush (Artemisia tridentata) habitats in the Great Basin region.

This is a perennial herb with several decumbent or erect stems growing from a caudex. The stems are up to about 22 centimeters long, often with much of their length underground. The fleshy compound leaves have dissected leaflets of varying shape and size. Flowers arise from the leaf axils. The upper two petals are reddish violet, and the lower three are purplish to white with purple veining and yellow or orange bases.

== See also ==
- Sagebrush steppe
- Northern Basin and Range ecoregion
- Central Basin and Range ecoregion
