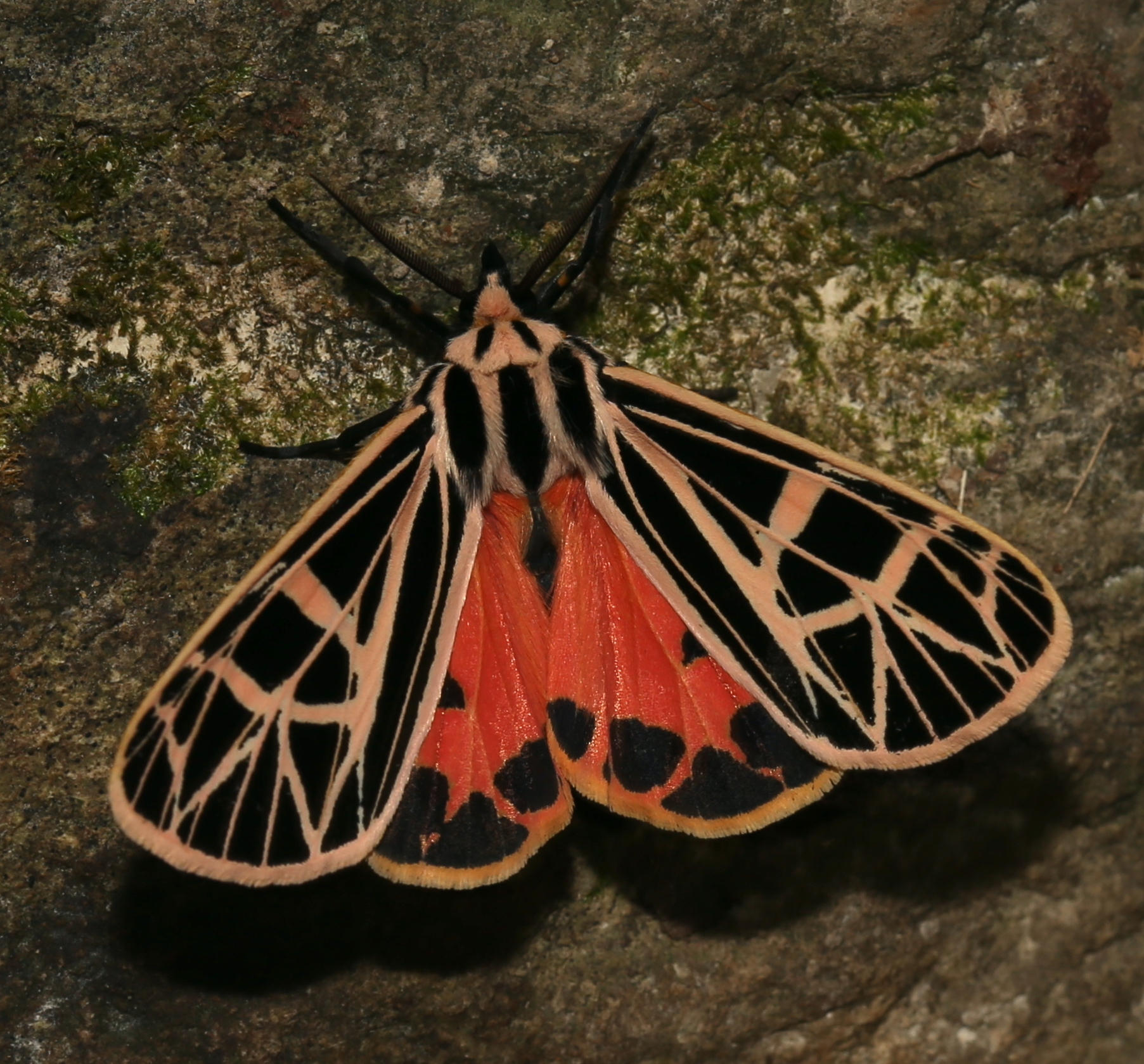

Scientific classification
- Kingdom: Animalia
- Phylum: Arthropoda
- Class: Insecta
- Order: Lepidoptera
- Superfamily: Noctuoidea
- Family: Erebidae
- Subfamily: Arctiinae
- Genus: Apantesis
- Species: A. parthenice

Binomial name
- Apantesis parthenice (Kirby, 1837)

Synonyms
- Grammia parthenice (Kirby, 1837); Callimorpha parthenice Kirby, 1837; Arctia saundersii Grote, 1864; Arctia intermedia Stretch, 1873; Arctia stretchii Grote, 1875; Arctia approximata Stretch, 1885; Arctia intermedia var. circa Stretch, 1906; Apantesis parthenice (Kirby, 1837)

= Parthenice tiger moth =

Species of moth

The parthenice tiger moth (Apantesis parthenice) is a moth of the family Erebidae. It is found in south-eastern Canada, and the eastern United States. The moths are common in fields and woodland edges from June to late September. The moth is nocturnal and is attracted to light sources.

The wingspan is about 7.5 cm (3 in). The fore wings and the thorax are black, with a complex network of bold white veining and white margins. The hind wings and abdomen are orange-pink with black patches. The brightly striped pattern of the wings has inspired the common name of tiger moth. Their bodies are stout and furry.

Caterpillars of the species are dark with contrasting bright markings and covered with stiff hairs. They are toxic like the adults. Many species of tiger moths contain toxic substances, so the bright patterns of both adults and larvae serve as a warning to predators. Contact with the hairy bodies of these caterpillars can cause skin irritation. Tiger moths have a well-developed hearing organ, or tympanum, on each side of the thorax. The larvae feed on various low-growing plants, including dandelion, Vernonia, and thistles.

This species was formerly a member of the genus Grammia, but was moved to Apantesis along with the other species of the genera Grammia, Holarctia, and Notarctia.
