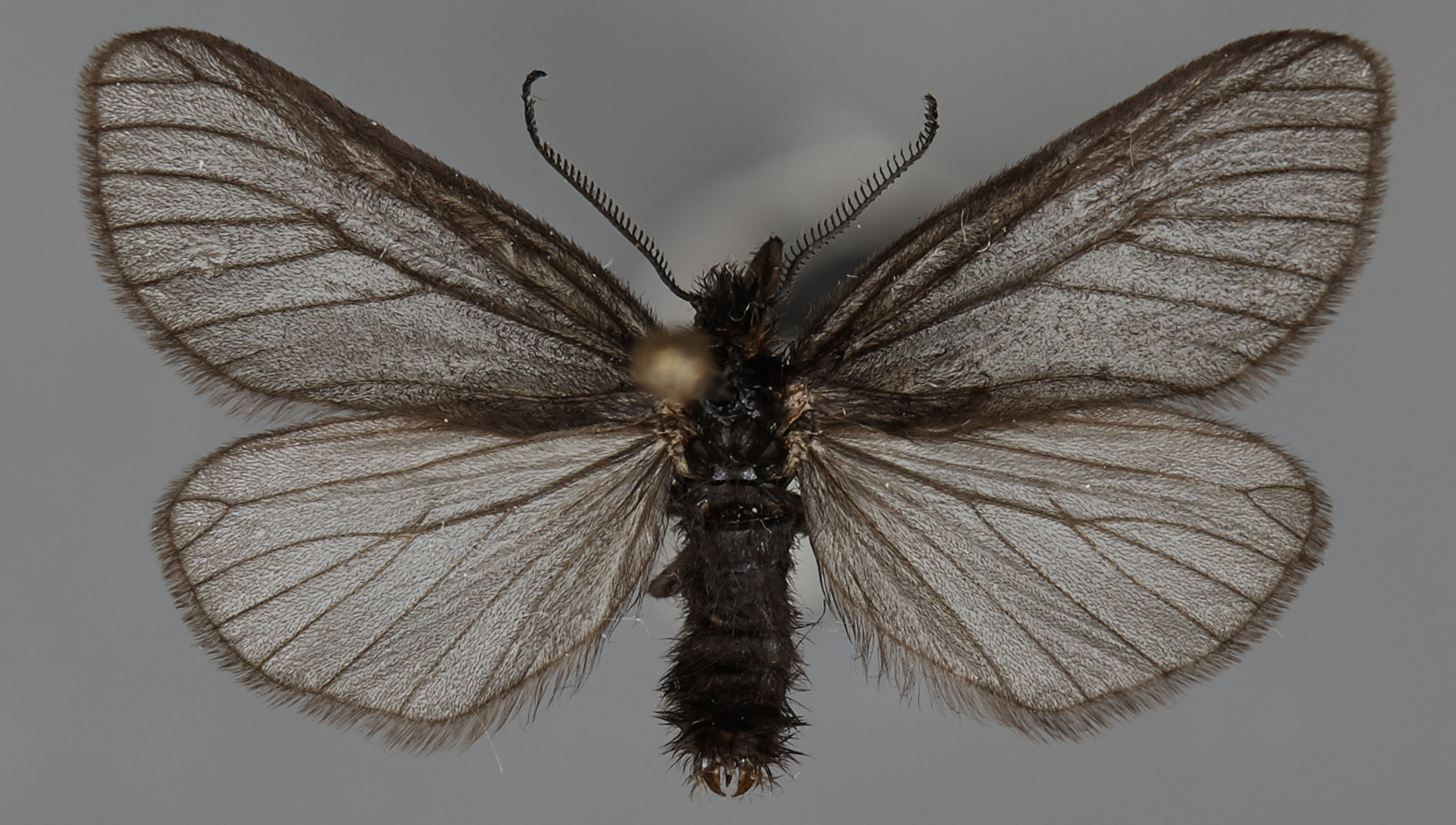
- Acsala anomala

Scientific classification
- Kingdom: Animalia
- Phylum: Arthropoda
- Clade: Pancrustacea
- Class: Insecta
- Order: Lepidoptera
- Superfamily: Noctuoidea
- Family: Erebidae
- Subfamily: Arctiinae
- Tribe: Lithosiini
- Subtribe: Acsalina; Bendib and Minet, 1999
- Genus: Acsala; Benjamin, 1935
- Species: A. anomala

Binomial name
- Acsala anomala Benjamin, 1935

= Acsala =

Genus of moths

Acsala is a monotypic genus of lichen moth in the monotypic subtribe Acsalina of the family Erebidae. Its single species, Acsala anomala, has Hodges number 8104.1 and is known from the US (Alaska) and Canada (Yukon).

== Behavior ==
Eggs are deposited in a single layer on the underside of rocks, in batches of up to thirty, and take eight to ten days to hatch. Larvae feed on rock-growing lichens, with a strong preference for black foliose and crustose lichens. Species of Buellia, Lecidea, Orphniospora, Parmelia and Umbilicaria have been recorded as food sources.

Adult males possess weak flight and are day-active; females are flightless and spend much of their time under rocks.

== Appearance ==
Freshly laid eggs are red-orange, and later turn pale orange. Larvae have barbed setae. Adult males have broad wings with a wingspan of 27–28 mm, while adult females possess narrow ("stenopterous") wings. Wing venation is variable.

== Taxonomy ==
Acsala anomala and its genus were both first described by Foster H. Benjamin in 1935. Subtribe Acsalina was introduced in 1983 by Franclemont, but remained a nomen nudum until a formal description was given in 1999 by Amel Bendib and Joël Minet.
