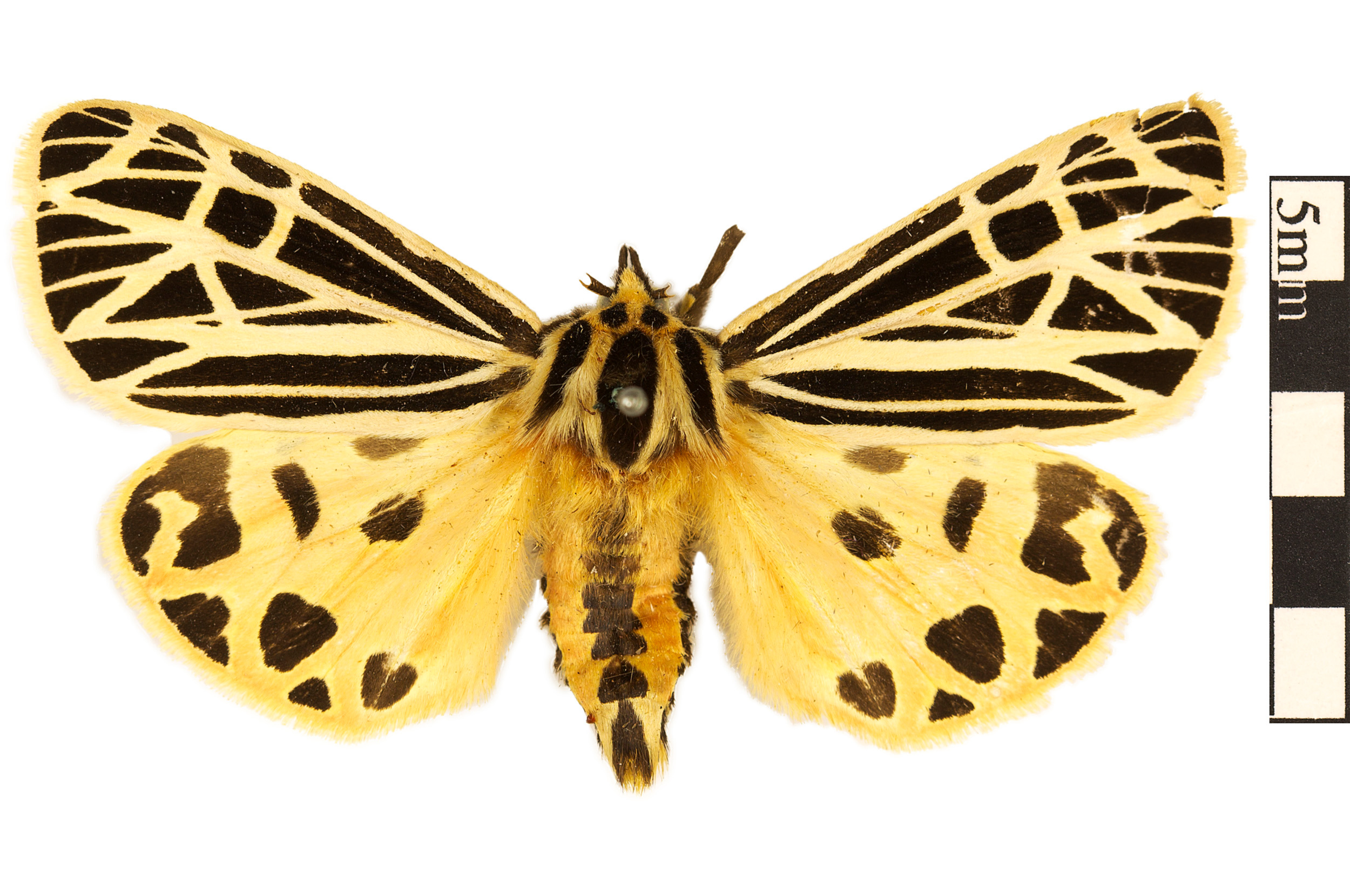
- Male Virgin Tiger Moth

Scientific classification
- Kingdom: Animalia
- Phylum: Arthropoda
- Class: Insecta
- Order: Lepidoptera
- Superfamily: Noctuoidea
- Family: Erebidae
- Subfamily: Arctiinae
- Genus: Apantesis
- Species: A. virgo

Binomial name
- Apantesis virgo (Linnaeus, 1758)

Synonyms
- Grammia virgo (Linnaeus, 1758); Bombyx virgo Linnaeus, 1758; Euprepia virgo var. citrinaria Neumoegen & Dyar, 1893; Grammia virgo f. simplex Stretch, 1906

= Apantesis virgo =

Species of moth

Apantesis virgo, the virgin tiger moth, is a moth of the family Erebidae. The species was first described by Carl Linnaeus in his 1758 10th edition of Systema Naturae. It is found in North America from Newfoundland south to Florida west to Alberta.

The wingspan is about 56 mm.

The larvae feed on various low-growing plants, including Thermopsis rhombifolia and Plantago species. The species overwinters in the larval stage.

This species was formerly a member of the genus Grammia, but was moved to Apantesis along with the other species of the genera Grammia, Holarctia, and Notarctia.

== Subspecies ==
- Apantesis virgo virgo (from the Great Lakes region and Atlantic seaboard south through New England, to at least West Virginia. In the west, the range extends to north-eastern British Columbia)
- Apantesis virgo gigas B. C. Schmidt, 2009 (south-eastern United States, including the Great Smoky Mountains, south to Georgia and northern Florida)
