= Apantesis blakei =

Blake's tiger moth

Scientific classification
- Kingdom: Animalia
- Phylum: Arthropoda
- Class: Insecta
- Order: Lepidoptera
- Superfamily: Noctuoidea
- Family: Erebidae
- Subfamily: Arctiinae
- Genus: Apantesis
- Species: A. blakei

Binomial name
- Apantesis blakei (Grote, 1864)

Synonyms
- Grammia blakei (Grote, 1864); Arctia blakei Grote, 1864; Apandesis blakei

Species of moth

Apantesis blakei, or Blake's tiger moth, is a moth of the family Erebidae. It was described by Augustus Radcliffe Grote in 1864. It is found on the North American Great Plains, and southern prairie provinces of Canada.

The larvae feed on Antennaria dimorpha, Koeleria cristata, Poa sandbergii, Stipa comata, Agropyron smithii, Eurotia lanata, Bouteloua gracilis and Carex species.

This species was formerly a member of the genus Grammia, but was moved to Apantesis along with the other species of the genera Grammia, Holarctia, and Notarctia.
