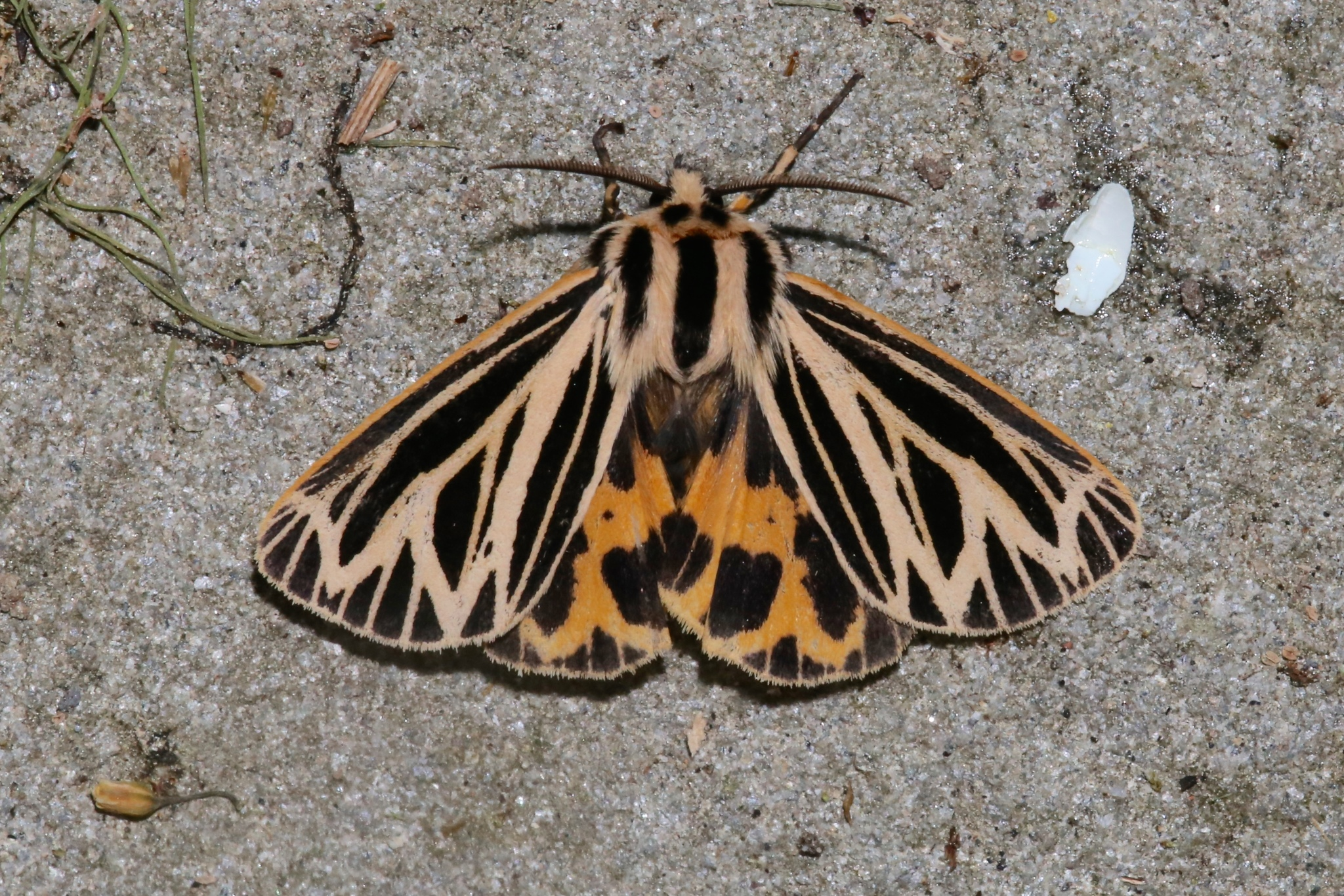

Scientific classification
- Kingdom: Animalia
- Phylum: Arthropoda
- Class: Insecta
- Order: Lepidoptera
- Superfamily: Noctuoidea
- Family: Erebidae
- Subfamily: Arctiinae
- Genus: Apantesis
- Species: A. virguncula

Binomial name
- Apantesis virguncula (W. Kirby, 1837)

Synonyms
- Grammia virguncula (Kirby, 1837); Callimorpha virguncula Kirby, 1837; Euprepia virguncula var. otiosa Neumögen & Dyar, 1893

= Apantesis virguncula =

Little virgin tiger moth

Species of moth

Apantesis virguncula, the little virgin tiger moth, is a moth of the family Erebidae.

The length of the forewings is 13.9–20.5 mm. Adults are generally on wing from mid June to late July, although there are records from late May to late August.

The larvae feed on various herbaceous plants, particularly species of the family Asteraceae. Records include dandelion, knotweed and plantain.

This species was formerly a member of the genus Grammia, but was moved to Apantesis along with the other species of the genera Grammia, Holarctia, and Notarctia.
