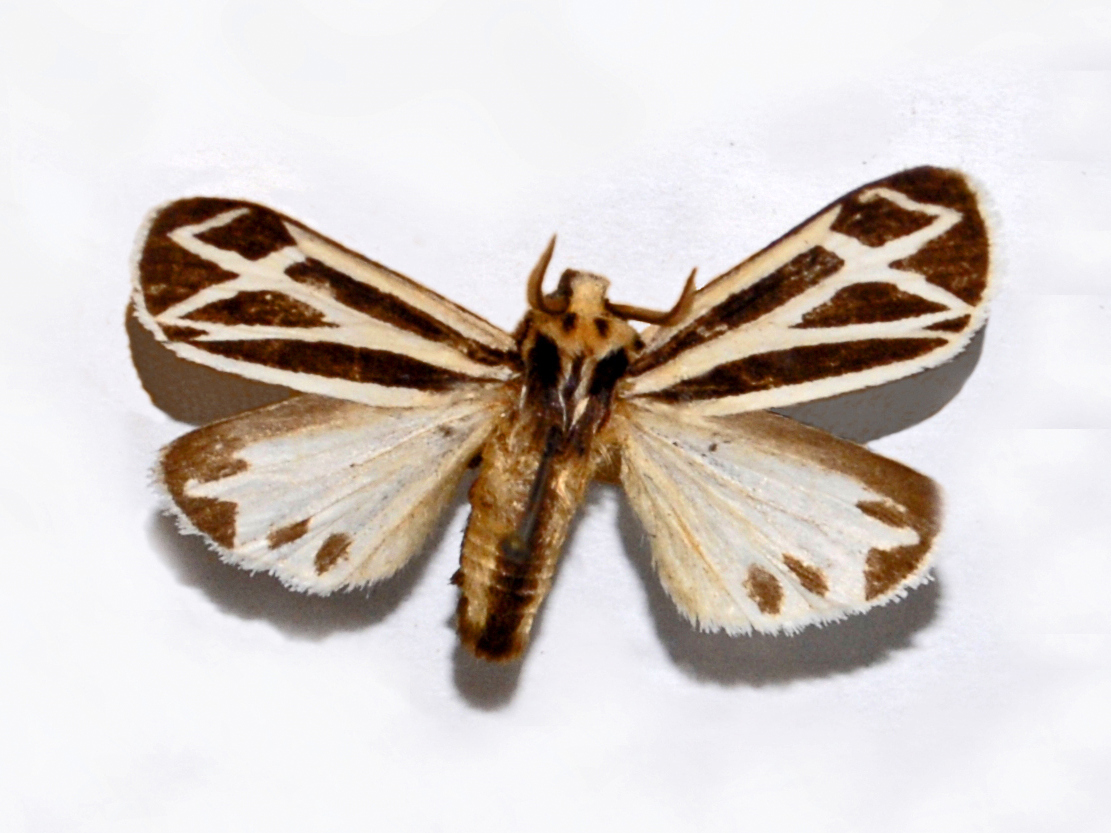

Scientific classification
- Kingdom: Animalia
- Phylum: Arthropoda
- Clade: Pancrustacea
- Class: Insecta
- Order: Lepidoptera
- Superfamily: Noctuoidea
- Family: Erebidae
- Subfamily: Arctiinae
- Genus: Apantesis
- Species: A. nais

Binomial name
- Apantesis nais (Drury, 1773)

Synonyms
- Spilosoma nais Drury, 1773; Bombyx cuneata Goeze, 1781; Arctia decorata Saunders, 1863; Arctia ochreata Butler, 1881; Apantesis phaleratula Strand, 1919; Arctia nais

= Apantesis nais =

Nais tiger moth

Species of moth

Apantesis nais, the Nais tiger moth, is a moth of the family Erebidae. It was described by Dru Drury in 1773.

== Description ==
The wingspan is 30–42 mm (1.2–1.7 in). Forewings are mostly black with cream-colored costal border and lines extending from base in males. Hindwings are variable in color but usually they are reddish or yellow and show a row of large black spots in median area. Females have a quite reduced set of pale lines on the forewings and the hindwings have broad black bands in the subterminal area.

Adults are on wing from April to October. The larvae feed on a wide range of herbaceous and woody plants, including grasses, violets, plantain and clover.

== Distribution and habitat ==
This species can be found in North America from Quebec and Maine, south to Florida, and west to Texas and South Dakota. It has also been spotted in Ohio. It prefers woodlands and forested habitats.
