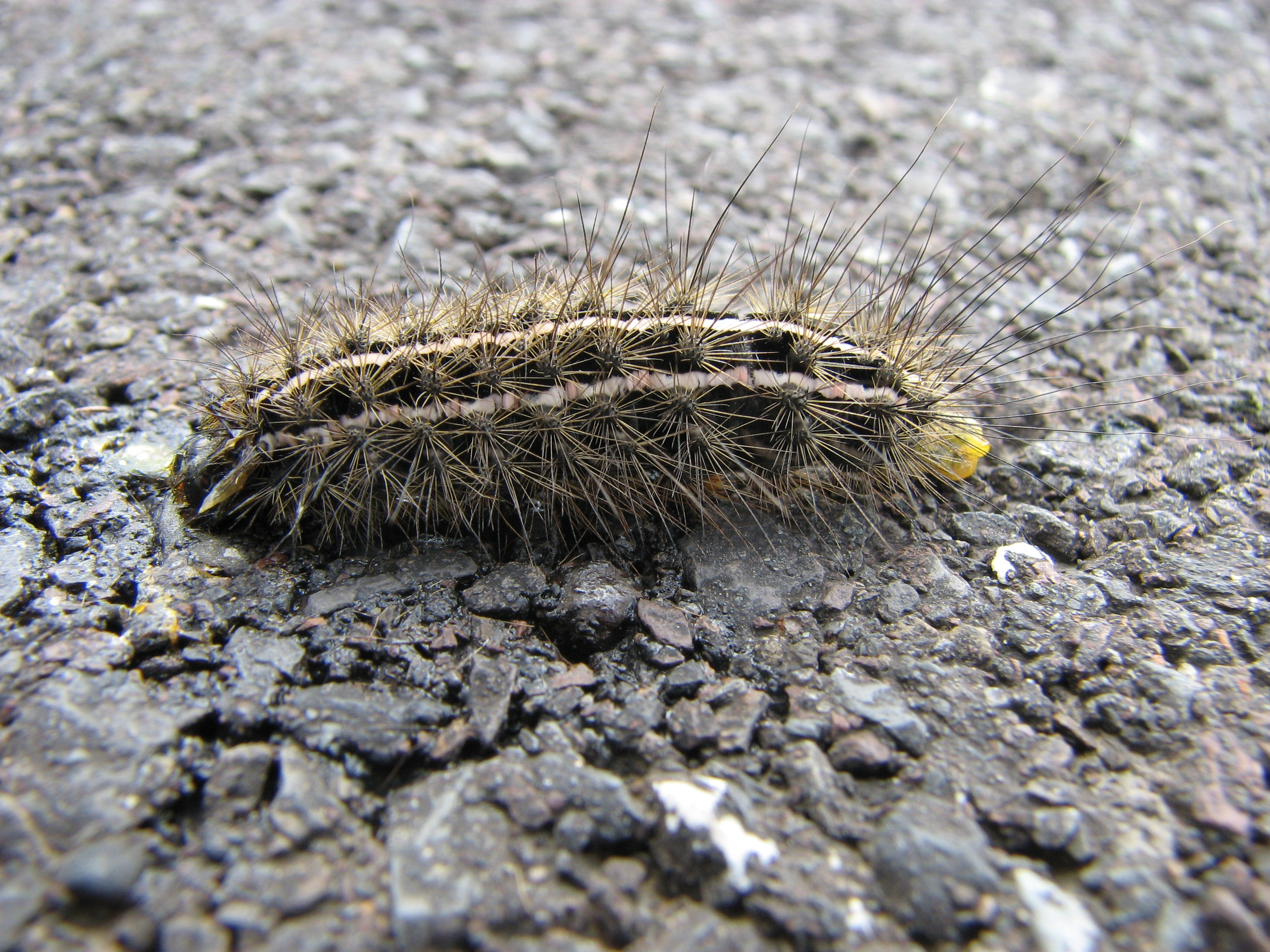

Scientific classification
- Kingdom: Animalia
- Phylum: Arthropoda
- Class: Insecta
- Order: Lepidoptera
- Superfamily: Noctuoidea
- Family: Erebidae
- Subfamily: Arctiinae
- Genus: Apantesis
- Species: A. arge

Binomial name
- Apantesis arge (Drury, 1773)

Synonyms
- Grammia arge (Drury, 1773); Phalaena arge Drury, 1773; Bombyx dione Fabricius, 1775; Noctua incarnatorubra Goeze, 1781; Apantesis nervosa Neumoegen & Dyar, 1893; Arctia strigosa Stretch, 1906

= Apantesis arge =

Arge moth

Species of moth

Apantesis arge, the arge moth or arge tiger moth, is a moth of the family Erebidae. The species was first described by Dru Drury in 1773. It is found in North America from Quebec and Maine to Florida, West to New Mexico, North to North Dakota and Ontario.

The wingspan is 38–50 millimetres (1.5–2.0 in). Adults are on wing from April to September in most of the range and from July to September in Quebec. There are two generations per year in the south and one or two in the North.

The larvae feed on the leaves of corn, dock, lambs-quarter, Chenopodium, grape, plantain, Opuntia, smartweed and sunflower.

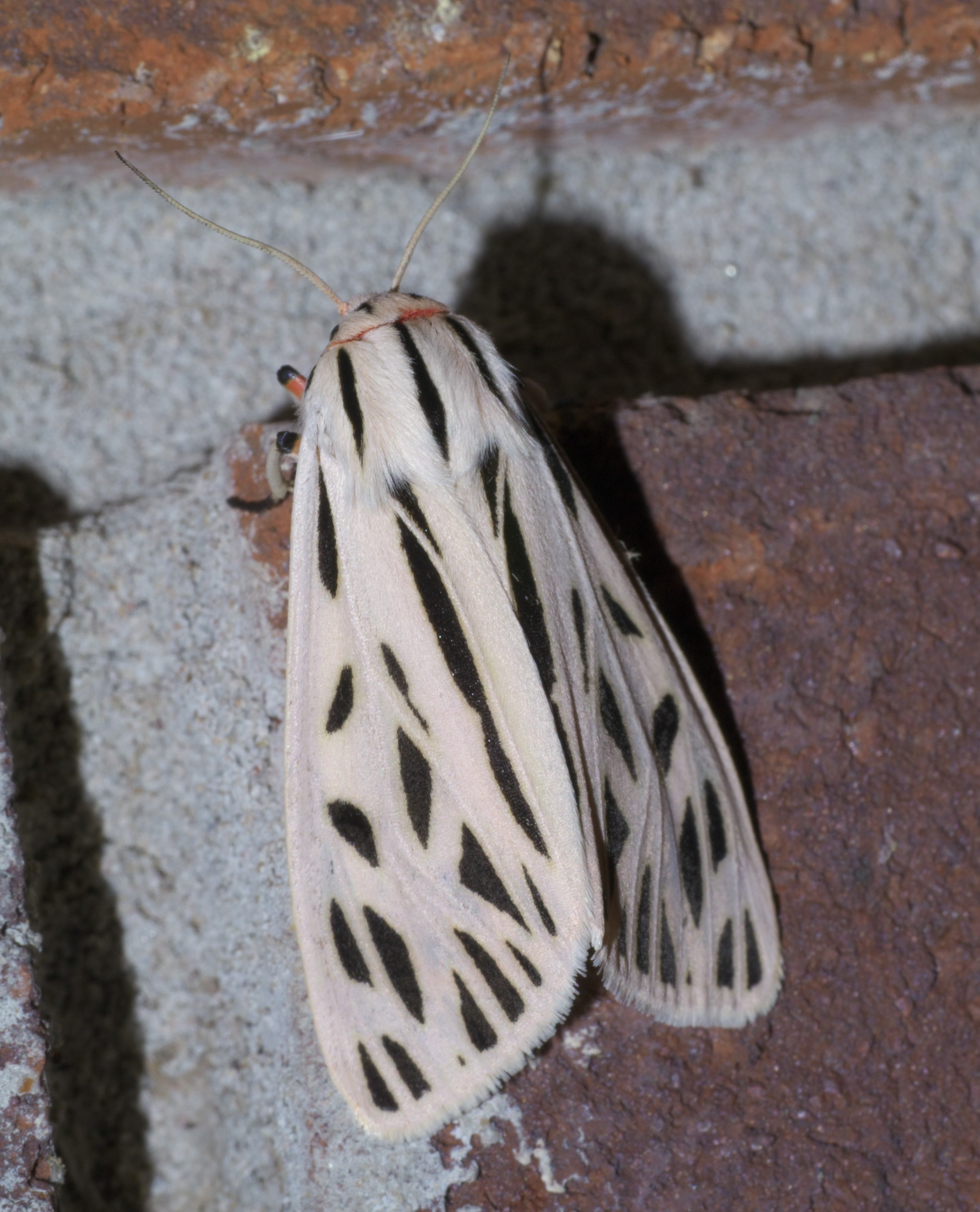

This species was formerly a member of the genus Grammia, but was moved to Apantesis along with the other species of the genera Grammia, Holarctia, and Notarctia.
