= Apantesis philipiana =

Scientific classification
- Kingdom: Animalia
- Phylum: Arthropoda
- Class: Insecta
- Order: Lepidoptera
- Superfamily: Noctuoidea
- Family: Erebidae
- Subfamily: Arctiinae
- Genus: Apantesis
- Species: A. philipiana

Binomial name
- Apantesis philipiana (Ferguson, 1985)

Synonyms
- Grammia philipiana Ferguson, 1985; Grammia olga Dubatolov, 1990

Species of moth

Apantesis philipiana is a moth of the family Erebidae. It was described by Douglas C. Ferguson in 1985. It is found in the far northwest of North America from Wrangel Island west to Mackenzie Delta in the Northwest Territories and south to Denali National Park in Alaska. It was named in honor of Kenelm Philip, a lepidopterist who started and ran the Alaska Lepidoptera Survey from 1970 to 2014.

The length of the forewings is 17 mm. Adults have been recorded on wing from mid-to-late July.

This species was formerly a member of the genus Grammia, but was moved to Apantesis along with the other species of the genera Grammia, Holarctia, and Notarctia.
