= Lepypiranga =

Scientific classification
- Domain: Eukaryota
- Kingdom: Animalia
- Phylum: Arthropoda
- Class: Insecta
- Order: Lepidoptera
- Superfamily: Noctuoidea
- Family: Erebidae
- Subfamily: Arctiinae
- Genus: Lepypiranga; Rego Barros, 1966
- Species: L. albiceps

Binomial name
- Lepypiranga albiceps (Rothschild, 1933)

Synonyms
- Generic: Ypiranga Rego Barros, 1959 (preocc. Mello-Leitão, 1922); Specific: Halysidota albiceps Rothschild, 1933; Halysidota albinucha Rothschild, 1935; Ypiranga nigrorubra Rego Barros, 1959

Genus of moths

Lepypiranga is a monotypic moth genus in the family Erebidae and subfamily Arctiinae described by Rego Barros in 1966. Its only species, Lepypiranga albiceps, was described by Walter Rothschild in 1933. It is found in Brazil.
