= Apantesis williamsii =

Williams' tiger moth

Scientific classification
- Kingdom: Animalia
- Phylum: Arthropoda
- Class: Insecta
- Order: Lepidoptera
- Superfamily: Noctuoidea
- Family: Erebidae
- Subfamily: Arctiinae
- Genus: Apantesis
- Species: A. williamsii

Binomial name
- Apantesis williamsii (Dodge, 1871)

Synonyms
- Grammia williamsii (Dodge, 1871); Arctia williamsii Dodge, 1871; Arctia determinata Neumögen, 1881; Apantesis tooele ab. ophir Barnes & McDunnough, 1910; Apantesis bolanderi ab. confluentis Strand, 1919

Species of moth

Apantesis williamsii, or Williams' tiger moth, is a moth of the family Erebidae. It was described by Charles R. Dodge in 1871. It is found in North America from the Northwest Territories east to the northern Great Lakes region, New Brunswick and New England. It also occurs throughout the northern Great Plains, south at higher elevations to Arizona and New Mexico, west to south-eastern British Columbia and eastern California.

The length of the forewings is 14.9 mm.

Larvae have been reared on a variety of forbs, and is probably a general feeder on herbaceous plants and grasses.

This species was formerly a member of the genus Grammia, but was moved to Apantesis along with the other species of the genera Grammia, Holarctia, and Notarctia.

== Subspecies ==
- Apantesis williamsii williamsii (Dodge, 1871)
- Apantesis williamsii tooele (Barnes & McDunnough, 1910) (Central Utah)
