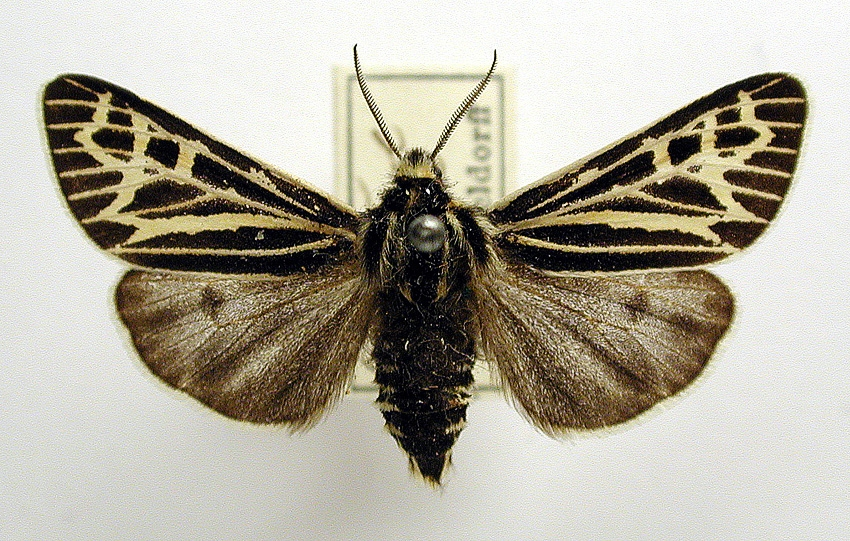

Scientific classification
- Kingdom: Animalia
- Phylum: Arthropoda
- Class: Insecta
- Order: Lepidoptera
- Superfamily: Noctuoidea
- Family: Erebidae
- Subfamily: Arctiinae
- Genus: Apantesis
- Species: A. quenseli

Binomial name
- Apantesis quenseli (Paykull, 1791)

Synonyms
- Grammia quenseli (Paykull, 1793); Bombyx quenseli Paykull, 1793; Bombyx strigosa Fabricius, 1793; Euprepia gelida Möschler, 1849; Chelonia quenseli ab. falloui Jourdhuil, 1866; Arctia quenseli var. gelida Schøyen, 1880; Apantesis quenselii var. norvegica Strand, 1919; Apantesis quenseli gelida; Orodemnias quenselii daisetsuzana Matsumura, 1927

= Apantesis quenseli =

Labrador tiger moth

Species of moth

Apantesis quenseli, the Labrador tiger moth, is a moth of the family Erebidae. In Central Europe the species is found in the Central Alps at altitudes of 2,000–2,700 metres (6,600–8,900 ft). They are also present in Northern Scandinavia. It is widely distributed in Polar Eurasia, mountains of Siberia, Mongolia, North China, Japan (Mt. Daisetsu on Hokkaido), Polar North America.

The wingspan is 26–42 millimetres (1.0–1.7 in).

The larvae feed on Alchemilla alpina and Plantago alpina.

This species was formerly a member of the genus Grammia, but was moved to Apantesis along with the other species of the genera Grammia, Holarctia, and Notarctia.

== Subspecies ==
- Apantesis quenseli gelida (Möschler, 1848)
- Apantesis quenseli liturata (Ménétriès, 1859)
- Apantesis quenseli quenseli (Paykull, 1793)
- Apantesis quenseli saura Dubatolov, 2007 (Kazakhstan)
- Apantesis quenseli zamolodchikovi Saldaitis & Ivinskis, 2001 (Russia: Wrangel Island)
- Apantesis quenseli daisetsuzana (Matsumura, 1927) (Japan: Mt. Daisetsu)
