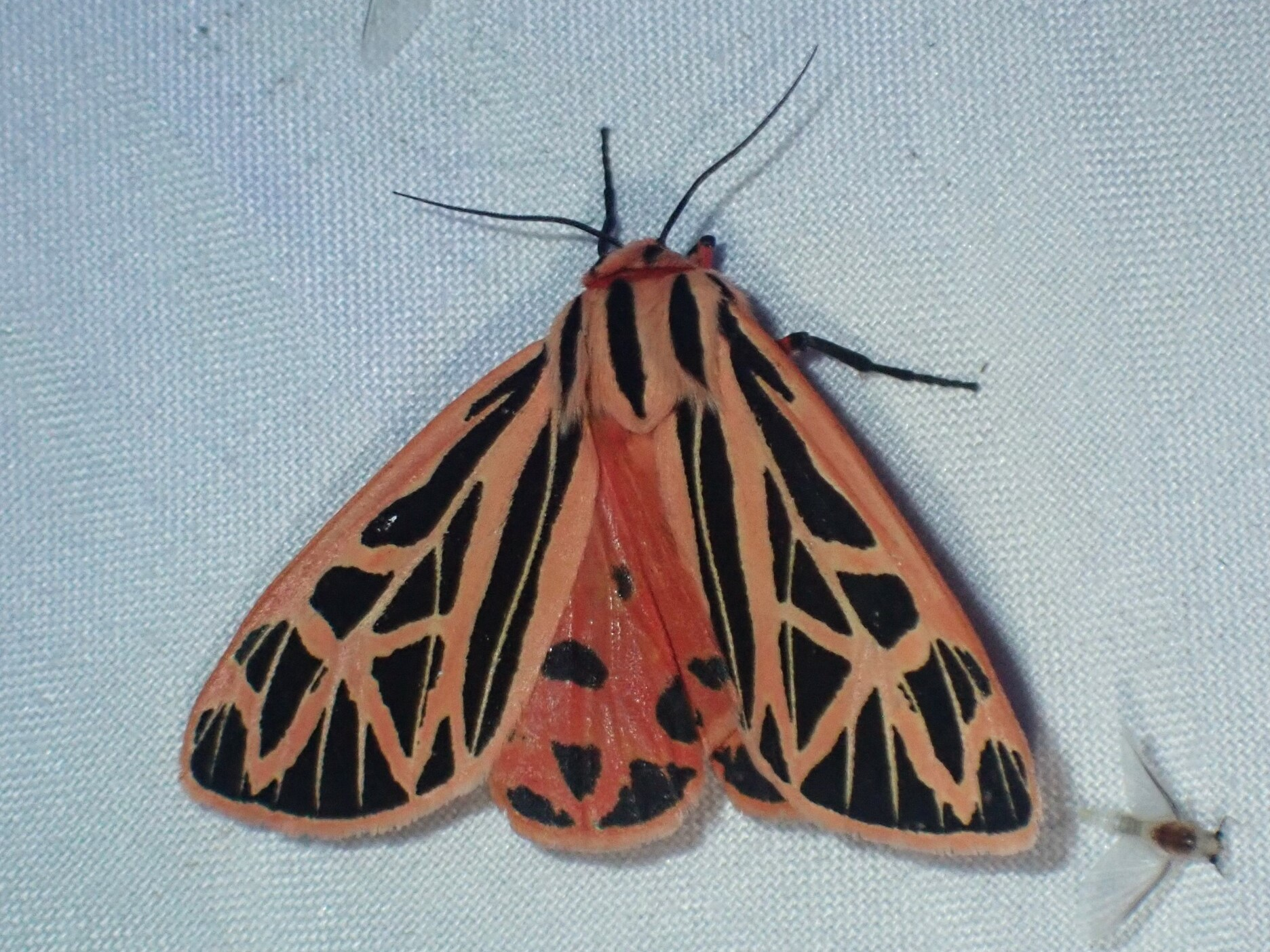

Scientific classification
- Kingdom: Animalia
- Phylum: Arthropoda
- Class: Insecta
- Order: Lepidoptera
- Superfamily: Noctuoidea
- Family: Erebidae
- Subfamily: Arctiinae
- Genus: Apantesis
- Species: A. doris

Binomial name
- Apantesis doris (Boisduval, 1869)

Synonyms
- List: Grammia doris (Boisduval, 1869); Chelonia doris Boisduval, 1869; Chelonia nerea Boisduval, 1869; Arctia michabo Grote, 1875; Arctia minea Slosson, 1892; Apantesis doris

= Apantesis doris =

Doris tiger moth

Species of moth

Apantesis doris, the Doris tiger moth, is a species of moth in the family Erebidae. It was first described by Jean Baptiste Boisduval in 1869. It is found in North America from British Columbia, northern Idaho, Alberta and western Montana. In the east, it is found in the Atlantic Coast provinces and from Nova Scotia to northern Florida and west to central Texas. The habitat consists of open willow/sedge fens and probably other open wetlands in the boreal forest.

The length of the forewings is about 19 mm. Adults are on wing from June to August.

The larvae feed on various herbaceous plants, including Lactuca sativa and Taraxacum officinale.

This species was formerly a member of the genus Grammia, but was moved to Apantesis along with the other species of the genera Grammia, Holarctia, and Notarctia.

== Subspecies ==
- Apantesis doris doris
- Apantesis doris minea (Slosson, 1892)
