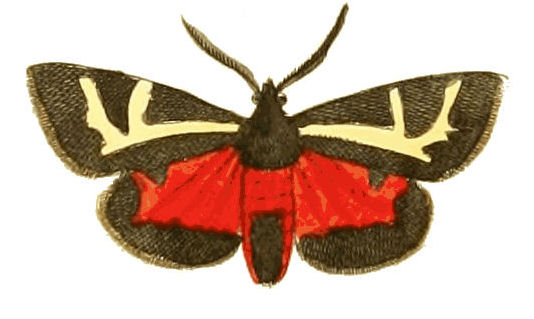

Scientific classification
- Kingdom: Animalia
- Phylum: Arthropoda
- Class: Insecta
- Order: Lepidoptera
- Superfamily: Noctuoidea
- Family: Erebidae
- Subfamily: Arctiinae
- Genus: Apantesis
- Species: A. figurata

Binomial name
- Apantesis figurata (Drury, 1773)

Synonyms
- Grammia figurata (Drury, 1773); Bombyx figurata Drury, 1773; Euplagia ceramica Hübner, 1820; Arctia celia Saunders, 1863; Arctia snowi Grote, 1875; Arctia excelsa Neumögen, 1883; Arctia phyllira ab. lugubris Hulst, 1887; Apantesis figurata var. preciosa Nixon, 1911

= Apantesis figurata =

Figured tiger moth

Species of moth

Apantesis figurata, the figured tiger moth, is a moth of the family Erebidae. It was described by Dru Drury in 1773. It is found in North America from southern Ontario and New Hampshire south to Georgia and west to Colorado and Texas.

The average length of a sample of forewings was 15.77 mm. There are two generations per year in northern Ohio. In the northern part of the range, adults are mostly on wing from May to June in one generation. In the southwest adults have been recorded on wing from April to October.

The larvae feed on various low-growing plants, including alfalfa and plantain.

This species was formerly a member of the genus Grammia, but was moved to Apantesis along with the other species of the genera Grammia, Holarctia, and Notarctia.
