= A. borealis =

A. borealis may refer to:

- Abacetus borealis, a ground beetle
- Acanthothecis borealis, a script lichen found in Australia
- Achillea borealis, a synonym of Achillea millefolium, yarrow
- Acianthus borealis, the northern mosquito orchid, a plant found in Australia
- Acidicapsa borealis, a bacterium
- Ahaetulla borealis, the northern Western Ghats vine snake, a tree snake found in India
- Albertonykus borealis, a dinosaur
- Amaurobius borealis, a spider found in the United States and Canada
- Aneurus borealis, a flat bug found in North America
- Anisosticta borealis, a ladybug found in North America
- Aphidoletes borealis, a synonym of Aphidoletes aphidimyza, the aphid midge
- Aphoebantus borealis, a bee fly
- Apocephalus borealis, a parasitoid phorid fly
- Aradus borealis, a flat bug found in North America
- Archepandemis borealis, a moth found in North America
- Arctia borealis, a synonym of Arctia parthenos, the St. Lawrence tiger moth, found in North America
- Ariadnaria borealis, the boreal hairysnail, a sea snail found in the North Sea, the Arctic Ocean, and the Atlantic Ocean
- Armillaria borealis, a mushroom
- Artemisia borealis, a synonym of Artemisia campestris subsp. borealis, a plant native to Eurasia and North America
- Aspidophoroides borealis, a synonym of Aspidophoroides monopterygius, the alligatorfish, a marine fish found in the Atlantic Ocean
- Astarte borealis, the boreal astarte, a mollusc found in the Arctic, Pacific, and Atlantic Oceans
