= Arctia elisabethae =

Scientific classification
- Kingdom: Animalia
- Phylum: Arthropoda
- Class: Insecta
- Order: Lepidoptera
- Superfamily: Noctuoidea
- Family: Erebidae
- Subfamily: Arctiinae
- Genus: Arctia
- Species: A. elisabethae

Binomial name
- Arctia elisabethae (Kotzsch, 1939)

Synonyms
- Oroncus elisabethae (Kotzsch, 1938); Micrarctia elisabethae Kotzsch, 1938; Phragmatobia elisabethae

Species of moth

Arctia elisabethae is a moth of the family Erebidae. It was described by Hans Kotzsch in 1939. It is found in the Hindu Kush mountain range.

The species of the genus Oroncus, including this one, were moved to Arctia as a result of phylogenetic research published by Rönkä et al. in 2016.
