= Arctia churkini =

Scientific classification
- Kingdom: Animalia
- Phylum: Arthropoda
- Clade: Pancrustacea
- Class: Insecta
- Order: Lepidoptera
- Superfamily: Noctuoidea
- Family: Erebidae
- Subfamily: Arctiinae
- Genus: Arctia
- Species: A. churkini

Binomial name
- Arctia churkini (Saldaitis, Ivinskis & Witt, 2003)

Synonyms
- Acerbia churkini Saldaitis, Ivinskis, & Witt, 2003

Species of moth

Arctia churkini is a moth of the family Erebidae. It was described by Saldaitis, Ivinskis and Witt in 2003 and is endemic to Kyrgyzstan.

This species was formerly a member of the genus Acerbia, but was moved to Arctia along with the other species of the genera Acerbia, Pararctia, Parasemia, Platarctia, and Platyprepia.
