= Arctia buddenbrocki =

Scientific classification
- Kingdom: Animalia
- Phylum: Arthropoda
- Class: Insecta
- Order: Lepidoptera
- Superfamily: Noctuoidea
- Family: Erebidae
- Subfamily: Arctiinae
- Genus: Arctia
- Species: A. buddenbrocki

Binomial name
- Arctia buddenbrocki Kotzsch, 1929

Synonyms
- Preparctia buddenbrocki (O. Bang-Haas, 1933); Preparctia buddenbrocki biedermanni O. Bang-Haas, 1933

Species of moth

Arctia buddenbrocki is a moth in the family Erebidae. It was described by Hans Kotzsch in 1929. It is found in Gansu and southern Shaanxi, both in China.

The species of the genus Preparctia, including this one, were moved to Arctia as a result of phylogenetic research published by Rönkä et al. in 2016.
