= Friedrich Wilhelm Niepelt =

Friedrich Wilhelm Niepelt (10 November 1862 in Striegau – 26 May 1936) was a German entomologist specialising in Lepidoptera. Niepelt was an insect dealer in Zirlau (located near Świebodzice). He is commemorated with insects having the specific epithet of niepeltiana, an example being Phragmatobia niepeltiana, a moth species circumscribed by Embrik Strand in 1919.

== Publications ==
Very partial list (examples)

- Neue südamerikanische Papilionen - Berliner entomologische Zeitschrift 52(4), pp. [208- 210, 2 figs.] (1907)
- Neue paläarktische Macrolepidopteren. Int. Ent. Ztg., Bd. 5, No. 58, S. 274-275 (1911).
- parts of 'Lepidoptera Niepeltiana'. (By E. Strand.) Vol. 1.(1914).
- Ein neuer Papilio von Halmaheira. Znt. Entomol. Z. 18, 69-70 (1924).
- Neue exotische Rhopaloceren. Internat. Entomol. Zeitschr. 21(7): 49-53 (1927).
- Neue papuanische Papilio (Troides)- Formen. Int. Entomol. Z. 28(7): 69-72 (1934).

His collection is in the Museum of Natural History Wroclaw University.
