= Kluane =

Kluane may refer to:

- Kluane National Park and Reserve, two protected areas in the Yukon, Canada
- Kluane Lake, a lake in the Yukon
- Kluane First Nation, a First Nations band government in the Yukon
- Kluane (electoral district), used to elect a member to the Legislative Assembly of Yukon
- Kluane tiger moth (Arctia brachyptera), a moth of the family Erebidae
