= Arctia souliei =

Scientific classification
- Kingdom: Animalia
- Phylum: Arthropoda
- Class: Insecta
- Order: Lepidoptera
- Superfamily: Noctuoidea
- Family: Erebidae
- Subfamily: Arctiinae
- Genus: Arctia
- Species: A. souliei

Binomial name
- Arctia souliei (Oberthür, 1903)

Synonyms
- Platarctia souliei (Oberthür, 1911); Chelonia souliei Oberthür, 1911

Species of moth

Arctia souliei is a moth in the family Erebidae. It was described by Charles Oberthür in 1903. It is found in Tibet and Sichuan in China.

This species was formerly a member of the genus Platarctia, but was moved to Arctia along with the other species of the genera Acerbia, Pararctia, Parasemia, Platarctia, and Platyprepia.
