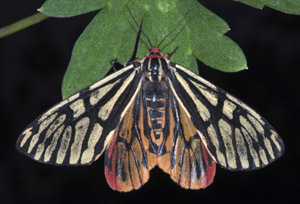
- Female

Scientific classification
- Domain: Eukaryota
- Kingdom: Animalia
- Phylum: Arthropoda
- Class: Insecta
- Order: Lepidoptera
- Superfamily: Noctuoidea
- Family: Erebidae
- Subfamily: Arctiinae
- Genus: Arctia
- Species: A. menetriesii

Binomial name
- Arctia menetriesii (Eversmann, 1846)

Synonyms
- Borearctia menetriesii (Eversmann 1846); Borearctia menetriesi (Eversmann 1846); Euprepia menetriesii Eversmann, 1846; ?Callimorpha principalis Fang Cheng-Lai, 1984

= Arctia menetriesii =

Menetries' tiger moth

Species of moths

Arctia menetriesii, the Menetries' tiger moth, is a species of tiger moth in the family Erebidae. It was first described by Eduard Friedrich Eversmann in 1846. It is found in Karelia, Oktyabrskoe, northeastern Kazakhstan, Altai Mountains, Sayan Mountains, Evenkia, Yakutia, the central Amur region, Primorsky Krai and central Sakhalin. It was believed to be extinct in Fennoscandia, but the species has been recently recorded in Finland.

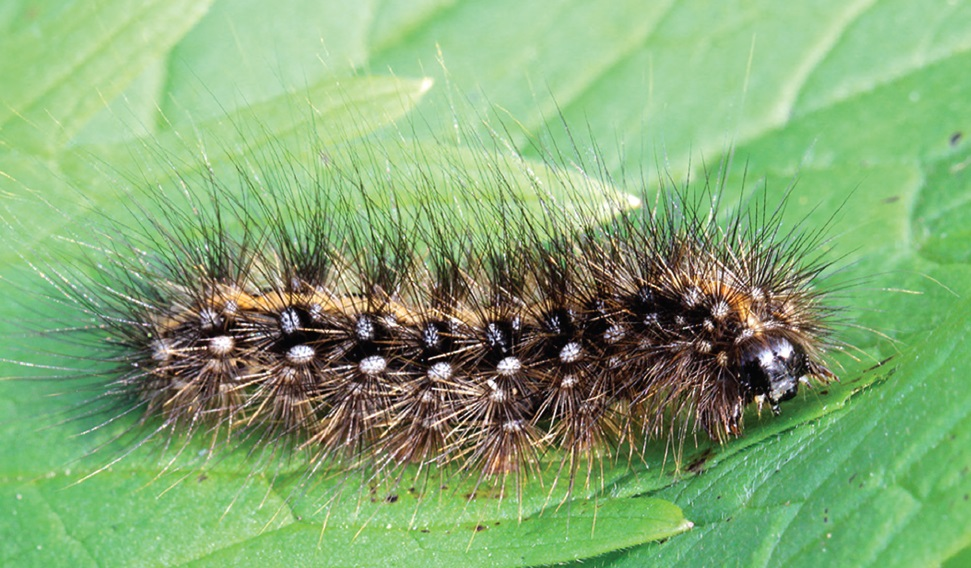
Last instar larva

Larvae feed on Aconitum rubicundum, Taraxacum, Plantago and Polygonum species.

This species was formerly the sole member of the genus Borearctia, but was transferred to Arctia as a result of phylogenetic research published by Rönkä et al. in 2016.
