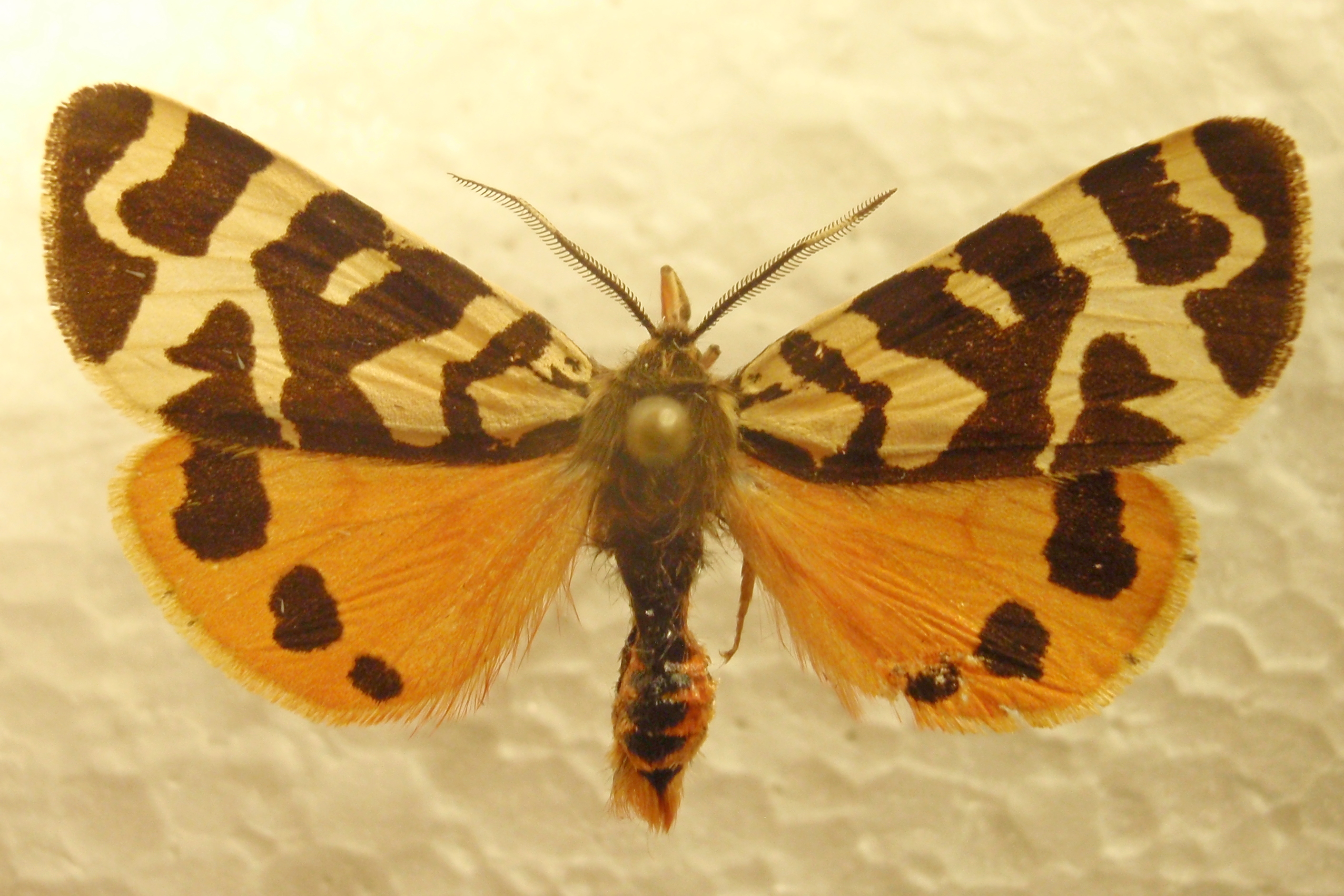

Scientific classification
- Kingdom: Animalia
- Phylum: Arthropoda
- Class: Insecta
- Order: Lepidoptera
- Superfamily: Noctuoidea
- Family: Erebidae
- Subfamily: Arctiinae
- Genus: Arctia
- Species: A. intercalaris

Binomial name
- Arctia intercalaris (Eversmann, 1843)

Synonyms
- Euprepia intercalaris Eversmann, 1843; Arctia alpherakii Staudinger, 1886; Arctia intercalaris badakhshana Wiltshire, 1961; Arctia thibetica Felder, 1874; Arctia suttadra Moore, 1879; Arctia cajula Staudinger, 1886; Arctia intercalaris cajula; Arctia aurantiaca Seitz, 1910; Arctia intercalaris-thibetica triangulum Petschke, 1934

= Arctia intercalaris =

Species of moth

Arctia intercalaris is a moth of the family Erebidae. It was described by Eduard Friedrich Eversmann in 1843. It is found in Dzhungarian Alatau, Zailiiskii Alatau, Tien Shan, Alai-Pamirs, Uzbekistan, Kyrgyzstan, Tajikistan, the mountains of Afghanistan, north-western Pakistan and from Kashmir to Kulu.

== Subspecies ==
- Arctia intercalaris alpherakyii Staudinger, 1886 - Tadzhikistan (Alai-Pamirs)
- Arctia intercalaris aurantiaca Seitz, 1910 - North-western Himalayas
- Arctia intercalaris elisabethana Bender & Naumann, 1980 - Afghanistan (inc. Badakhsban)
- Arctia intercalaris intercalaris (Eversmann, 1843) Kazakhstan (Kyrghyzstan), China (Xinjiang [Tien Shan])
- Arctia intercalaris suttadra Moore, 1879 - Pakistan (Azad Kazhmir)
- Arctia intercalaris thibetica Felder, 1874 - India (Kashmir, near Tibet)
- Arctia intercalaris truncata Kotzsch, 1938 - Afghanistan (inc. Badakhsban)
