= Arctia subnebulosa =

Conservation status
- Vulnerable (NatureServe)

Scientific classification
- Kingdom: Animalia
- Phylum: Arthropoda
- Class: Insecta
- Order: Lepidoptera
- Superfamily: Noctuoidea
- Family: Erebidae
- Subfamily: Arctiinae
- Genus: Arctia
- Species: A. subnebulosa

Binomial name
- Arctia subnebulosa (Dyar, 1899)

Synonyms
- Pararctia subnebulosa (Dyar, 1899); Hyphoraia subnebulosa Dyar, 1899; Pararctia tundrana Tshistjakov, 1990

Species of moth

Arctia subnebulosa is a moth of the family Erebidae. It was described by Harrison Gray Dyar Jr. in 1899. It is found in Alaska, Yukon and the Russian Far East.

This species was formerly a member of the genus Pararctia, but was moved to Arctia along with the other species of the genera Acerbia, Pararctia, Parasemia, Platarctia, and Platyprepia.

== Subspecies ==
- Arctia subnebulosa subnebulosa (Alaska, Yukon)
- Arctia subnebulosa tundrana Tshistjakov, 1990 (Polar Urals, Yamal, Gydan, Taymyr, Polar Yakutia, Chukotka, northern Koryakia)
