= Arctia dido =

Scientific classification
- Domain: Eukaryota
- Kingdom: Animalia
- Phylum: Arthropoda
- Class: Insecta
- Order: Lepidoptera
- Superfamily: Noctuoidea
- Family: Erebidae
- Subfamily: Arctiinae
- Genus: Arctia
- Species: A. dido

Binomial name
- Arctia dido (M. Wagner, 1841)

Synonyms
- Atlantarctia dido (Wagner, 1841); Euprepia dido Wagner, 1841; Diacrisia dido

Species of moth

Arctia dido is a moth of the family Erebidae. It was described by M. Wagner in 1841. It is found in Algeria.

The larvae feed on Taraxacum species.

This species, along with the others of the genus Atlantarctia, was moved to Arctia as a result of phylogenetic research published by Rönkä et al. in 2016.
