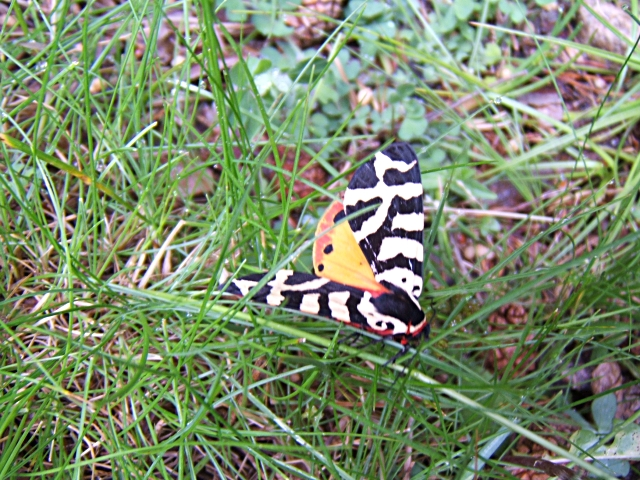

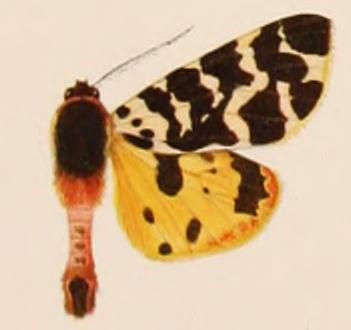

Scientific classification
- Domain: Eukaryota
- Kingdom: Animalia
- Phylum: Arthropoda
- Class: Insecta
- Order: Lepidoptera
- Superfamily: Noctuoidea
- Family: Erebidae
- Subfamily: Arctiinae
- Genus: Arctia
- Species: A. tigrina

Binomial name
- Arctia tigrina (Villers, 1789)

Synonyms
- Atlantarctia tigrina (Villers, 1789); Arctia fasciata

= Arctia tigrina =

Species of moth

Arctia tigrina is a moth of the family Erebidae. It is found on the Iberian Peninsula and the South of France and Italy.

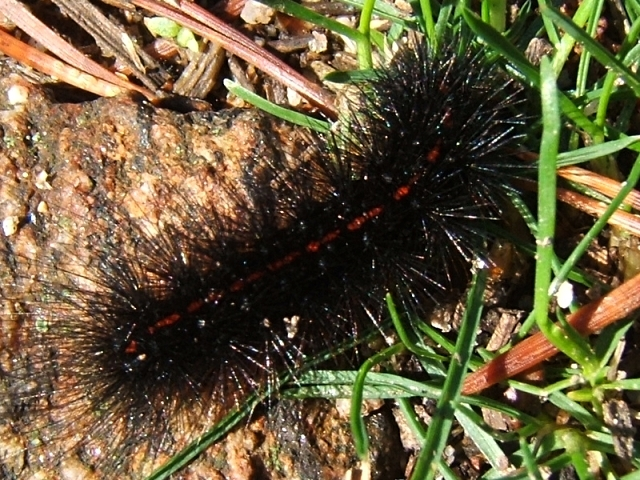
Larva

The larvae feed on various plants, including Syringa, Euphorbia and Genista species.

This species, along with the others of the genus Atlantarctia, was moved to Arctia as a result of phylogenetic research published by Rönkä et al. in 2016.
