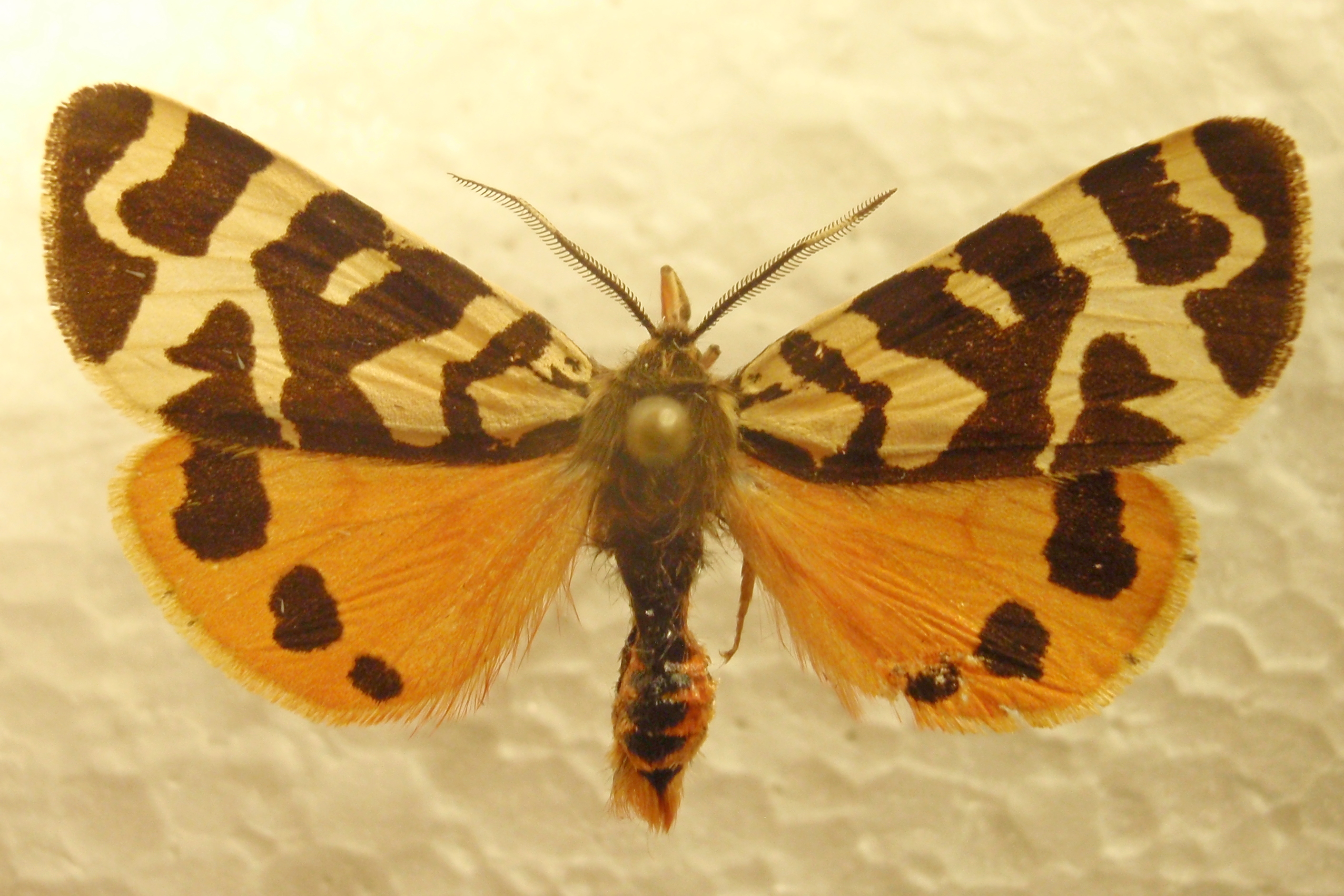
- Arctia intercalaris

Scientific classification
- Kingdom: Animalia
- Phylum: Arthropoda
- Class: Insecta
- Order: Lepidoptera
- Superfamily: Noctuoidea
- Family: Erebidae
- Subfamily: Arctiinae
- Tribe: Arctiini
- Subtribe: Arctiina
- Genus: Arctia
- Species: A. thibetica

Binomial name
- Arctia thibetica Felder, 1874

= Arctia thibetica =

Species of moth

Arctia thibetica is a species of tiger moth in the family Erebidae, found in the northwestern Himalayas of India.
