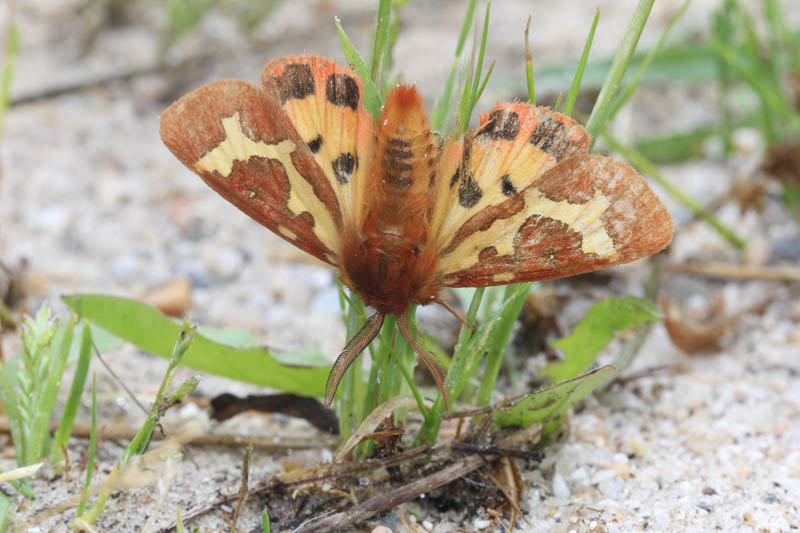

Scientific classification
- Kingdom: Animalia
- Phylum: Arthropoda
- Class: Insecta
- Order: Lepidoptera
- Superfamily: Noctuoidea
- Family: Erebidae
- Subfamily: Arctiinae
- Genus: Arctia
- Species: A. dejeani

Binomial name
- Arctia dejeani (Godart, 1822)

Synonyms
- Hyphoraia dejeani (Godart, 1822); Chelonia dejeani Godart, 1822; Hyphoraia dejeani carpetana Agenjo, 1937

= Arctia dejeani =

Species of moth

Arctia dejeani is a species of moth in the family Erebidae first described by Jean Baptiste Godart in 1822. It is found on the Iberian Peninsula.

The wingspan is 41–42 mm.

The larvae feed on Taraxacum and Plantago species.

This species, along with the others of the genus Hyphoraia, was moved to Arctia as a result of phylogenetic research published by Rönkä et al. in 2016.
