= Archepandemis morrisana =

Scientific classification
- Domain: Eukaryota
- Kingdom: Animalia
- Phylum: Arthropoda
- Class: Insecta
- Order: Lepidoptera
- Family: Tortricidae
- Genus: Archepandemis
- Species: A. morrisana

Binomial name
- Archepandemis morrisana Mutuura, 1978

Synonyms
- Pandemis morrisana

Species of moth

Archepandemis morrisana is a species of moth of the family Tortricidae first described by Akira Mutuura in 1978. It is found in Canada, where it has been recorded from New Brunswick.

The wingspan is up to 16 mm.
