= Arctia gurkoi =

Scientific classification
- Kingdom: Animalia
- Phylum: Arthropoda
- Clade: Pancrustacea
- Class: Insecta
- Order: Lepidoptera
- Superfamily: Noctuoidea
- Family: Erebidae
- Subfamily: Arctiinae
- Genus: Arctia
- Species: A. gurkoi

Binomial name
- Arctia gurkoi Dubatolov in Dubatolov & Gurko, 2004

Synonyms
- Oroncus gurkoi Dubatolov in Dubatolov & Gurko, 2004

Species of moth

Arctia gurkoi is a moth of the family Erebidae. It was described by Vladimir Viktorovitch Dubatolov in 2004. It is found in Pakistan (Azad Kashmir) and possibly Xinjiang, China.

The species of the genus Oroncus, including this one, were moved to Arctia as a result of phylogenetic research published by Rönkä et al. in 2016.
