= Archepandemis coniferana =

Scientific classification
- Domain: Eukaryota
- Kingdom: Animalia
- Phylum: Arthropoda
- Class: Insecta
- Order: Lepidoptera
- Family: Tortricidae
- Genus: Archepandemis
- Species: A. coniferana

Binomial name
- Archepandemis coniferana Mutuura, 1978

Synonyms
- Pandemis coniferana

Species of moth

Archepandemis coniferana is a species of moth of the family Tortricidae first described by Akira Mutuura in 1978. It is found in North America, where it has been recorded from Alberta, British Columbia and California. The habitat consists of coniferous forests.

The wingspan is over 17.5 mm. Adults have been recorded on wing from mid to late July.

Larvae have been reared from Pinus contorta, Pseudotsuga menziesii, Juniperus species, Picea engelmannii and Tsuga heterophylla.
