= Arctia oberthueri =

Scientific classification
- Kingdom: Animalia
- Phylum: Arthropoda
- Class: Insecta
- Order: Lepidoptera
- Superfamily: Noctuoidea
- Family: Erebidae
- Subfamily: Arctiinae
- Genus: Arctia
- Species: A. oberthueri

Binomial name
- Arctia oberthueri (Oberthür, 1890)

Synonyms
- Atlantarctia oberthueri (Oberthür, 1890); Chelonia oberthueri Oberthür, 1890

Species of moth

Arctia oberthueri is a moth of the family Erebidae. It was described by Charles Oberthür in 1890. It is found in Algeria and Tunisia.

This species, along with the others of the genus Atlantarctia, was moved to Arctia as a result of phylogenetic research published by Rönkä et al. in 2016.
