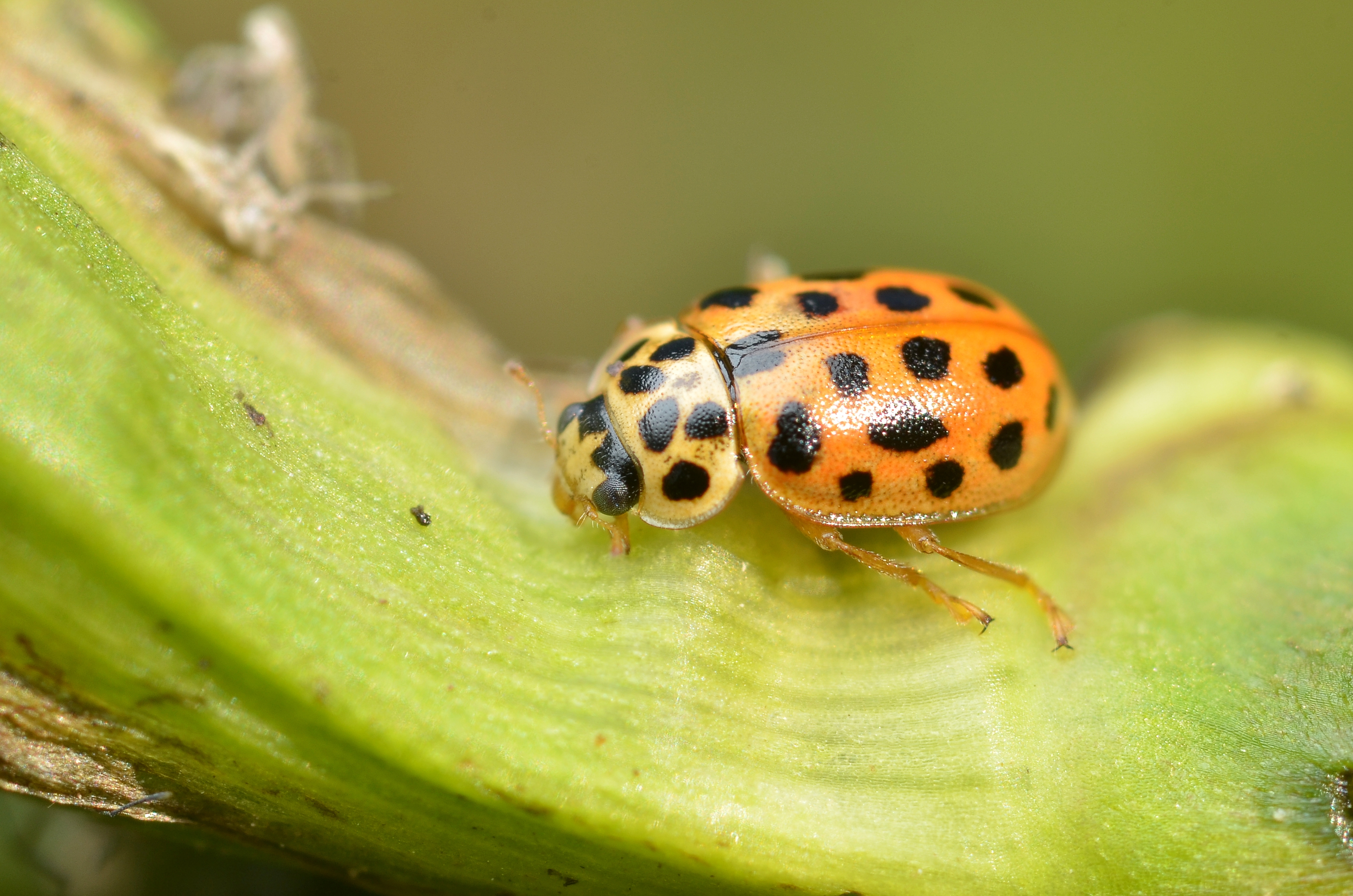
- Anisosticta novemdecimpunctata

Scientific classification
- Kingdom: Animalia
- Phylum: Arthropoda
- Clade: Pancrustacea
- Class: Insecta
- Order: Coleoptera
- Suborder: Polyphaga
- Infraorder: Cucujiformia
- Family: Coccinellidae
- Subfamily: Coccinellinae
- Tribe: Coccinellini
- Genus: Anisosticta; Chevrolat in Dejean, 1836

Species
- See text

= Anisosticta =

Genus of beetles

Anisosticta is a genus of beetles of the family Coccinellidae.

== Species ==
- Anisosticta bitriangularis (Say, 1824)
- Anisosticta borealis Timberlake, 1943
- Anisosticta caucasica (Fleischer, 1900)
- Anisosticta kobensis Lewis, 1896
- Anisosticta novemdecimpunctata (Linnaeus, 1758)
- Anisosticta sibirica Bielawski, 1958
- Anisosticta strigata (Thunberg, 1795)
- Anisosticta terminassianae Bielawski, 1959
