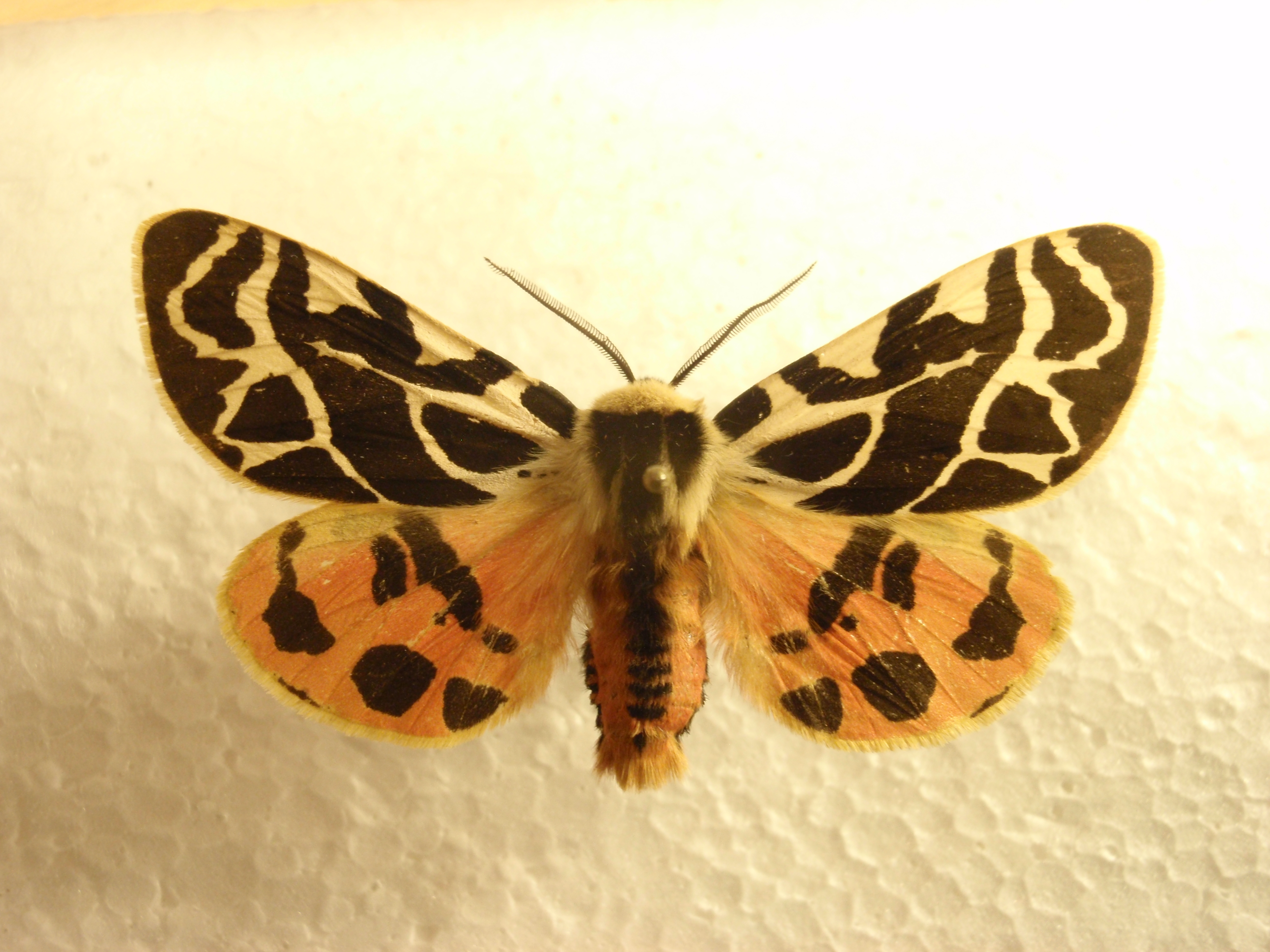
- Arctia mirifica

Scientific classification
- Kingdom: Animalia
- Phylum: Arthropoda
- Class: Insecta
- Order: Lepidoptera
- Superfamily: Noctuoidea
- Family: Erebidae
- Subfamily: Arctiinae
- Genus: Arctia
- Species: A. mirifica

Binomial name
- Arctia mirifica (Oberthür, 1892)

Synonyms
- Preparctia mirifica (Oberthür, 1892); Chelonia mirifica Oberthür, 1892; Preparctia romanovi mirifica

= Arctia mirifica =

Species of moth

Arctia mirifica is a moth in the family Erebidae. It was described by Charles Oberthür in 1892. It is found in western China, Tibet and north-western India.

This species, along with the others of the genus Preparctia, was moved to Arctia as a result of phylogenetic research published by Rönkä et al. in 2016.
