= Arctia khumbeli =

Scientific classification
- Kingdom: Animalia
- Phylum: Arthropoda
- Class: Insecta
- Order: Lepidoptera
- Superfamily: Noctuoidea
- Family: Erebidae
- Subfamily: Arctiinae
- Genus: Arctia
- Species: A. khumbeli

Binomial name
- Arctia khumbeli (Bang-Haas, 1927)

Synonyms
- Acerbia khumbeli (O. Bang-Haas, 1927); Hyphoraia seitzi khumbeli O. Bang-Haas, 1927; Acerbia seitzi khumbeli

Species of moth

Arctia khumbeli is a moth of the family Erebidae. It was described by Otto Bang-Haas in 1927. It is found in the Tian Shan of China.

This species was formerly a member of the genus Acerbia, but was moved to Arctia along with the other species of the genera Acerbia, Pararctia, Parasemia, Platarctia, and Platyprepia.
