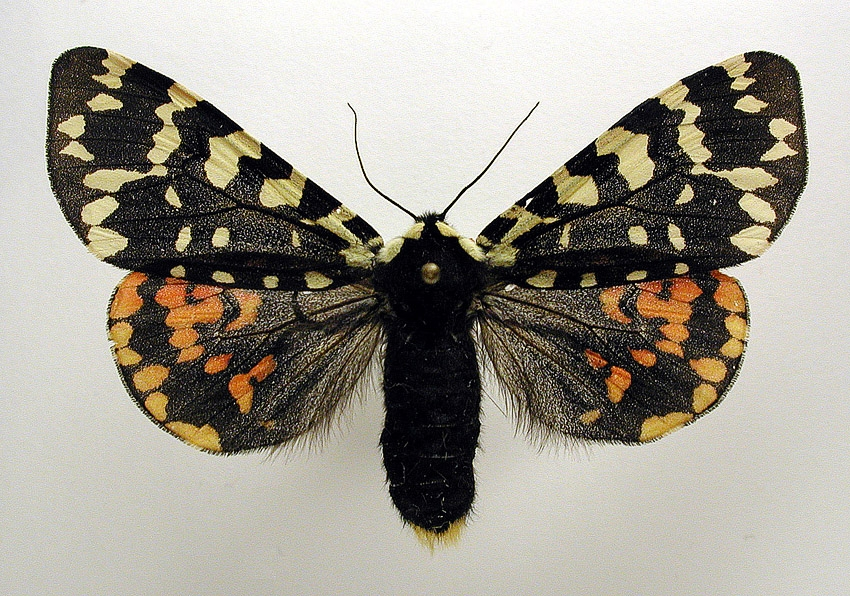

Conservation status
- Vulnerable (NatureServe)

Scientific classification
- Kingdom: Animalia
- Phylum: Arthropoda
- Class: Insecta
- Order: Lepidoptera
- Superfamily: Noctuoidea
- Family: Erebidae
- Subfamily: Arctiinae
- Genus: Arctia
- Species: A. alpina

Binomial name
- Arctia alpina (Quensel, 1802)

Synonyms
- Acerbia alpina (Quensel, 1802); Bombyx alpina Quensel, 1802; Arctia alpina (Quensel in Acerbi, 1802); Arctia thulea Dalman, 1823

= Arctia alpina =

Species of moth

Arctia alpina is a moth of the family Erebidae. It is found in northern Scandinavia, northern Siberia, high mountains of southern Siberia and northern Mongolia; also in Alaska and northwestern Canada.

Its wingspan is 42–50 mm.

The larvae feed on Taraxacum officinale, Vaccinium and Salix herbacea.

This species was formerly a member of the genus Acerbia, but was moved to Arctia along with the other species of the genera Acerbia, Pararctia, Parasemia, Platarctia, and Platyprepia.

== Subspecies ==
- Arctia alpina alpina
- Arctia alpina johanseni (O. Bang-Haas, 1927)
- Arctia alpina severa Saldaitis & Ivinskis, 2004 (Kodar Mountains in Siberia)
- Arctia alpina siberica O. Bang-Haas, 1927 (Siberia)
