= Arctia yarrowii =

Yarrow's tiger moth

Scientific classification
- Kingdom: Animalia
- Phylum: Arthropoda
- Class: Insecta
- Order: Lepidoptera
- Superfamily: Noctuoidea
- Family: Erebidae
- Subfamily: Arctiinae
- Genus: Arctia
- Species: A. yarrowii

Binomial name
- Arctia yarrowii Stretch, 1874

Synonyms
- Pararctia yarrowii (Stretch, 1874); Arctia remissa H. Edwards, 1888

Species of moth

Arctia yarrowii, or Yarrow's tiger moth, is a moth of the family Erebidae. It was described by Richard Harper Stretch in 1874. It is found in North America from Hudson Bay to British Columbia and northern Arizona. The habitat consists of barren rocky fellfields and slides above the timberline. These moths are also found in the Pacific Northwest.

The length of the forewings is about 22 mm. Adults are on wing from mid-July to mid-August.

The larvae probably feed on various herbaceous plants.

This species was formerly a member of the genus Pararctia, but was moved to Arctia along with the other species of the genera Acerbia, Pararctia, Parasemia, Platarctia, and Platyprepia.
