= Hermann Wernicke =

German entomologist

Hermann Wernicke (1851–1925) was a German entomologist.

From 1898 Wernicke was an insect dealer in Dresden. He also sold collecting equipment and natural history books. In 1899 he wrote Anleitung zur Deutschen Normalpräparation der Schmetterlinge. Published in Dresden, this was a manual on collecting, setting and conserving (as specimens) butterflies and moths. It was a very popular manual even with non German speakers. His private collection of Malay Peninsula butterflies collected between 1883 and 1884, his private collection of world Lepidoptera and his business were sold to Hans Kotzsch.
