= Arctia ladakensis =

Scientific classification
- Kingdom: Animalia
- Phylum: Arthropoda
- Class: Insecta
- Order: Lepidoptera
- Superfamily: Noctuoidea
- Family: Erebidae
- Subfamily: Arctiinae
- Genus: Arctia
- Species: A. ladakensis

Binomial name
- Arctia ladakensis (O. Bang-Haas, 1927)

Synonyms
- Oroncus ladakensis Bang-Haas, 1927; Arctia ladakensis Dubatolov, 1996

Species of moth

Arctia ladakensis is a moth of the family Erebidae. It was described by Otto Bang-Haas in 1927. It is found in Tibet and Xinjiang in China.

This species, along with the others of the genus Oroncus, was moved to Arctia as a result of phylogenetic research published by Rönkä et al. in 2016.
