= Arctia kolpakofskii =

Scientific classification
- Kingdom: Animalia
- Phylum: Arthropoda
- Class: Insecta
- Order: Lepidoptera
- Superfamily: Noctuoidea
- Family: Erebidae
- Subfamily: Arctiinae
- Genus: Arctia
- Species: A. kolpakofskii

Binomial name
- Arctia kolpakofskii Alpheraky, 1882

Synonyms
- Acerbia kolpakofskii (Alpheraky, 1882)

Species of moth

Arctia kolpakofskii is a moth of the family Erebidae. It was described by Sergei Alphéraky in 1882. It is found in eastern Tien Shan in Xinjiang, China.

This species was formerly a member of the genus Acerbia, but was moved to Arctia along with the other species of the genera Acerbia, Pararctia, Parasemia, Platarctia, and Platyprepia.
