= Arctia kasnakovi =

Scientific classification
- Kingdom: Animalia
- Phylum: Arthropoda
- Class: Insecta
- Order: Lepidoptera
- Superfamily: Noctuoidea
- Family: Erebidae
- Subfamily: Arctiinae
- Genus: Arctia
- Species: A. kasnakovi

Binomial name
- Arctia kasnakovi (Dubatolov, 1987)

Synonyms
- Sinoarctia kasnakovi Dubatolov, 1987

Species of moth

Arctia kasnakovi is a moth in the family Erebidae. It was described by Vladimir Viktorovitch Dubatolov in 1987. It is found in Qinghai, China.

The species of the genus Sinoarctia, including this one, were moved to Arctia as a result of phylogenetic research published by Rönkä et al. in 2016.
