= Arctia forsteri =

Scientific classification
- Kingdom: Animalia
- Phylum: Arthropoda
- Class: Insecta
- Order: Lepidoptera
- Superfamily: Noctuoidea
- Family: Erebidae
- Subfamily: Arctiinae
- Genus: Arctia
- Species: A. forsteri

Binomial name
- Arctia forsteri (Daniel, 1943)

Synonyms
- Sinoarctia forsteri (Daniel, 1943); Micrarctia forsteri Daniel, 1943

Species of moth

Arctia forsteri is a moth in the family Erebidae. It was described by Franz Daniel in 1943. It is found in Sichuan, China.

The species of the genus Sinoarctia , including this one, were moved to Arctia as a result of phylogenetic research published by Rönkä et al. in 2016.
