= Anisosticta borealis =

Scientific classification
- Kingdom: Animalia
- Phylum: Arthropoda
- Clade: Pancrustacea
- Class: Insecta
- Order: Coleoptera
- Suborder: Polyphaga
- Infraorder: Cucujiformia
- Family: Coccinellidae
- Genus: Anisosticta
- Species: A. borealis

Binomial name
- Anisosticta borealis Timberlake, 1943

Species of beetle

Anisosticta borealis is a species of lady beetle in the family Coccinellidae. It is found in North America, where it has been recorded from Manitoba to Alaska.

== Description ==
Adults are similar to Anisosticta bitriangularis, but the head is mostly black.
