= Archepandemis =

Scientific classification
- Domain: Eukaryota
- Kingdom: Animalia
- Phylum: Arthropoda
- Class: Insecta
- Order: Lepidoptera
- Family: Tortricidae
- Tribe: Archipini
- Genus: Archepandemis; Mutuura, 1978

Genus of tortrix moths

Archepandemis is a genus of moths in the tribe Archipini. The genus is treated as a synonym of Pandemis by some authors.

== Species ==
- Archepandemis borealis (Freeman, 1965)
- Archepandemis coniferana Mutuura, 1978
- Archepandemis morrisana Mutuura, 1978

== See also ==
- List of Tortricidae genera
