= Arctia weigerti =

Scientific classification
- Kingdom: Animalia
- Phylum: Arthropoda
- Clade: Pancrustacea
- Class: Insecta
- Order: Lepidoptera
- Superfamily: Noctuoidea
- Family: Erebidae
- Subfamily: Arctiinae
- Genus: Arctia
- Species: A. weigerti

Binomial name
- Arctia weigerti de Freina & Witt, 1985

Synonyms
- Oroncus weigerti (de Freina & Witt, 1985)

Species of moth

Arctia weigerti is a moth of the family Erebidae. It was described by Josef J. de Freina and Thomas Joseph Witt in 1985. It is found in northern Pakistan (Karakorum).

This species, along with the others of the genus Oroncus, was moved to Arctia as a result of phylogenetic research published by Rönkä et al. in 2016.
