= Arctia allardi =

Scientific classification
- Kingdom: Animalia
- Phylum: Arthropoda
- Class: Insecta
- Order: Lepidoptera
- Superfamily: Noctuoidea
- Family: Erebidae
- Subfamily: Arctiinae
- Genus: Arctia
- Species: A. allardi

Binomial name
- Arctia allardi (Oberthür, 1911)

Synonyms
- Preparctia allardi (Oberthür, 1911); Chelonia allardi Oberthür, 1911

Species of moth

Arctia allardi is a moth in the family Erebidae. It was described by Charles Oberthür in 1911. It is found in China (Sichuan, Qinghai, and eastern Tibet).

The species of the genus Preparctia , including this one, were moved to Arctia as a result of phylogenetic research published by Rönkä et al. in 2016.

== Subspecies ==
- Arctia allardi allardi
- Arctia allardi tibetica Dubatolov, Kishida & C.S. Wu, 2005 (China: Tibet)
