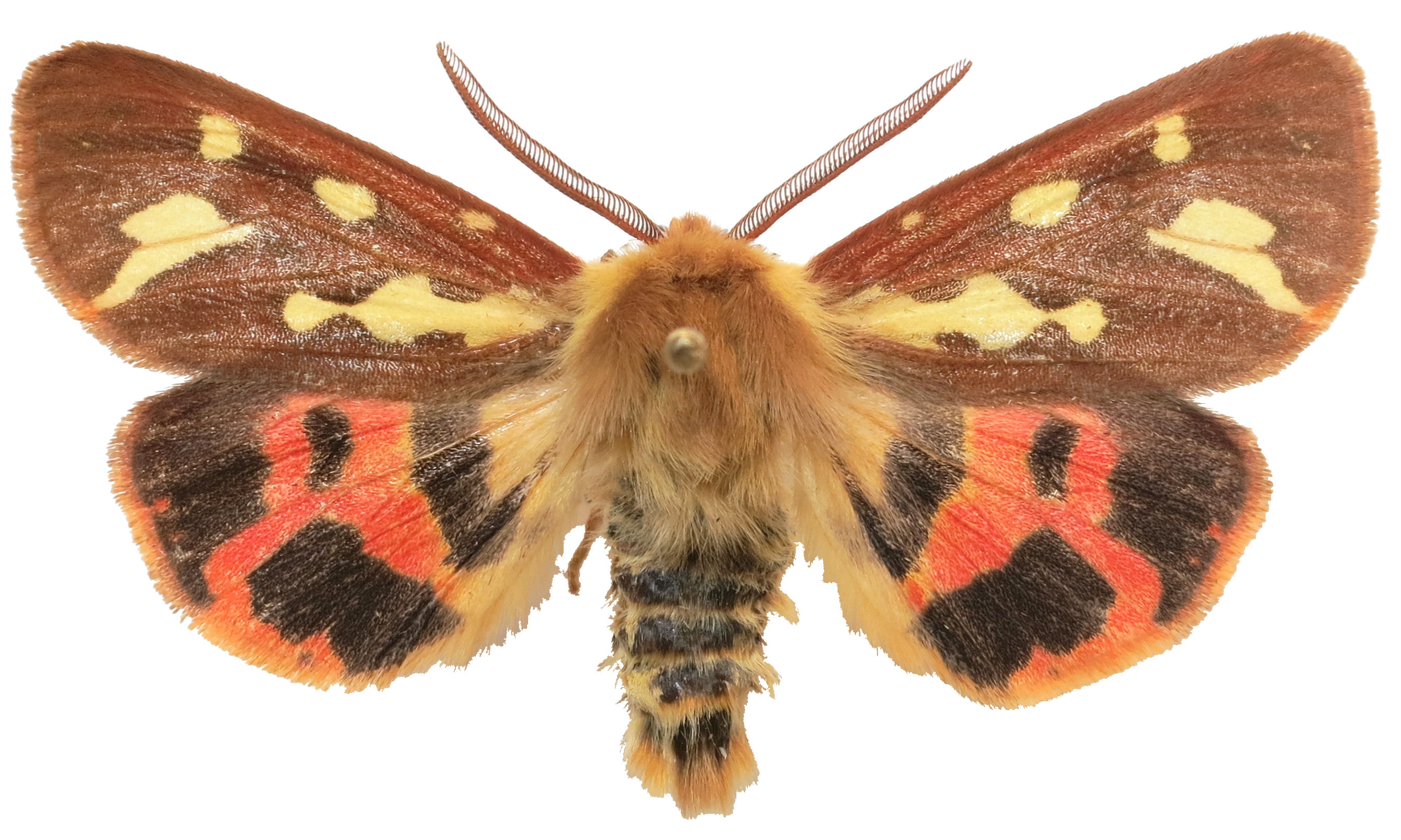
- Male - Bolzano, Italy

Scientific classification
- Kingdom: Animalia
- Phylum: Arthropoda
- Class: Insecta
- Order: Lepidoptera
- Superfamily: Noctuoidea
- Family: Erebidae
- Subfamily: Arctiinae
- Genus: Arctia
- Species: A. testudinaria

Binomial name
- Arctia testudinaria (Geoffroy in Fourcroy, 1785)

Synonyms
- Hyphoraia testudinaria (Geoffroy, 1785); Phalaena testudinaria Geoffroy, 1785; Bombyx maculania Lang, 1789; Phalaena curialis Esper, 1789; Bombyx civica Hübner, 1790; Arctia maculata Caradja, 1893; Arctia testudinaria f. crocea Schultz, 1908; Hyphoraia meridialpina Daniel, 1939

= Arctia testudinaria =

Patton's tiger

Species of moth

Arctia testudinaria, or Patton's tiger, is a moth of the family Erebidae. It was described by Geoffroy in 1785. It is found from northern Spain to southern and central France and southern Switzerland to north-eastern and southern Italy. It has also been recorded from Great Britain. The habitat consists of grasslands, slopes, forest edges, clear dry forests, cliffs and mountain slopes, maquis, garrigues and dry meadows.

The wingspan is 35–45 mm. Adults are on wing in May and July.

The larvae feed on various low-growing plants, including Plantago, Rumex, Achillea, Euphorbia cyparissias, Potentilla, Hieracium, Taraxacum, Cynoglossum, Deschampsia, Calamagrostis. The species overwinters in the larval stage. Pupation often takes place under flat stones.

This species, along with the others of the genus Hyphoraia, was moved to Arctia as a result of phylogenetic research published by Rönkä et al. in 2016.
