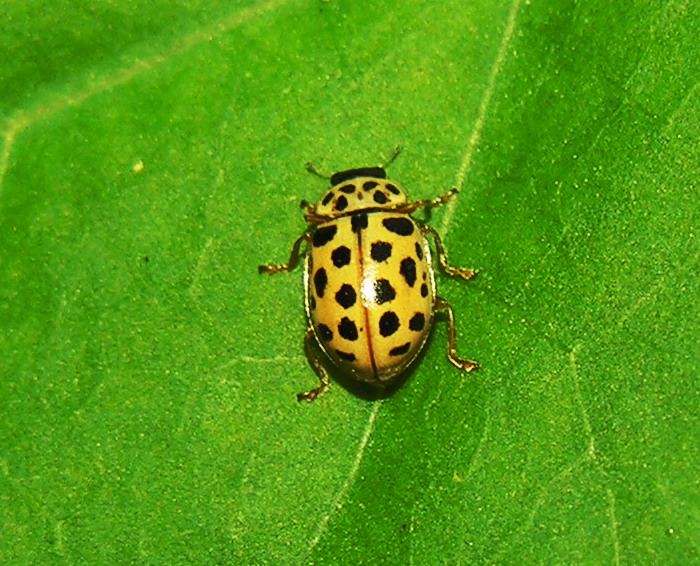
- Anisosticta novemdecimpunctata

Scientific classification
- Kingdom: Animalia
- Phylum: Arthropoda
- Clade: Pancrustacea
- Class: Insecta
- Order: Coleoptera
- Suborder: Polyphaga
- Infraorder: Cucujiformia
- Family: Coccinellidae
- Genus: Anisosticta
- Species: A. novemdecimpunctata

Binomial name
- Anisosticta novemdecimpunctata (Linnaeus, 1758)

= Anisosticta novemdecimpunctata =

Species of beetle

Anisosticta novemdecimpunctata, known as the water ladybird, is a species of beetle in family Coccinellidae. It is found in the Palearctic.

== Description ==
The beetles are between 3 and 4 mm in length, with elongated bodies that are comparatively weakly curved. They have yellow, orange, to reddish to pink-colored elytra that display 19 black spots. On the beige to yellow scutum are also six black patches that can be connected to each other through ridges. The variability is lower than in other species. Patches are seldom connected or absent. The legs are yellow, and the feet and claws are somewhat slightly darker. The elytra are spotted and finely-grained in between. The claws are untoothed.

== Biology ==
The habitat in Central Europe is wetlands- fen grassy marshes, forested swamps, and peat bogs and mires. They are found on marsh- and water-plants such as reeds (Phragmites spp.), sedges (Carex spp.), sweet-grass (Glyceria spp.) occasionally also on willows (Salix spp.), where they feed on aphids. The species also occurs on steppes (Pontic–Caspian steppe, Pannonian Steppe), birch outliers and on moor and bog edges. It also feeds on Erysiphales fungi on Gramineae and Compositae.

== Distribution ==
The species is common in the West Palearctic-Europe, and is found in the north up to southern Norway, central Sweden and Finland and into European Russia (middle zone and the south). In England and Ireland., the Caucasus, Siberia, Kazakhstan, Middle Asia.
