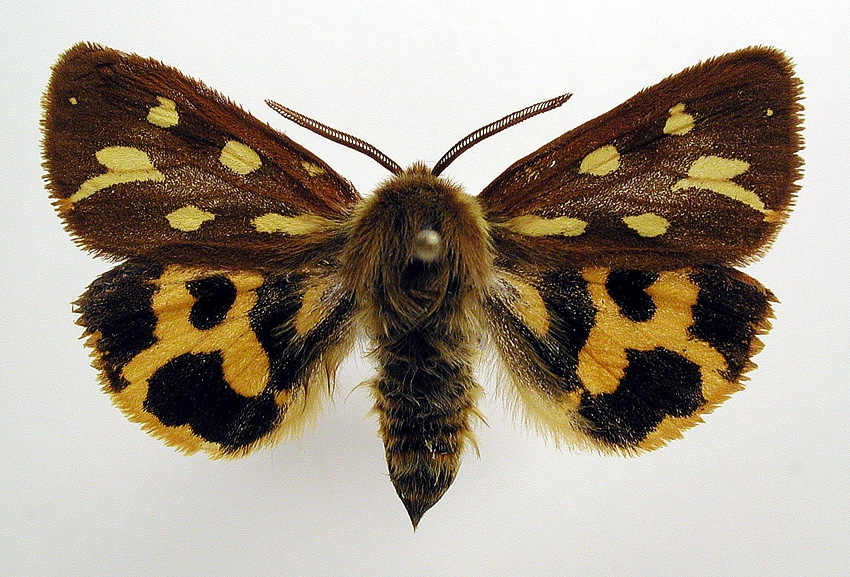

Scientific classification
- Kingdom: Animalia
- Phylum: Arthropoda
- Class: Insecta
- Order: Lepidoptera
- Superfamily: Noctuoidea
- Family: Erebidae
- Subfamily: Arctiinae
- Genus: Arctia
- Species: A. aulica

Binomial name
- Arctia aulica (Linnaeus, 1758)

Synonyms
- Hyphoraia aulica (Linnaeus, 1758)

= Arctia aulica =

Brown tiger moth

Species of moth

Arctia aulica, the brown tiger moth, is a moth of the family Erebidae. The species was first described by Carl Linnaeus in his 1758 10th edition of Systema Naturae.

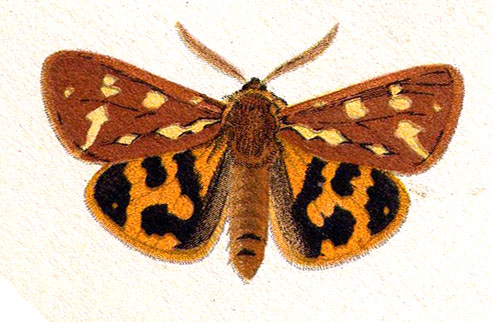
Illustration

The wingspan is 34–38 mm. The moth flies from May to July depending on the location.

The larvae feed on various plants, including Achillea, Hieracium, Euphorbia, Knautia and Taraxacum species.

This species, along with the others of the genus Hyphoraia, was moved to Arctia as a result of phylogenetic research published by Rönkä et al. in 2016.
