= Arctia bundeli =

Scientific classification
- Kingdom: Animalia
- Phylum: Arthropoda
- Clade: Pancrustacea
- Class: Insecta
- Order: Lepidoptera
- Superfamily: Noctuoidea
- Family: Erebidae
- Subfamily: Arctiinae
- Genus: Arctia
- Species: A. bundeli

Binomial name
- Arctia bundeli (Dubatolov & Gurko, 2004)

Synonyms
- Oroncus bundeli Dubatolov & Gurko, 2004

Species of moth

Arctia bundeli is a moth of the family Erebidae. It was described by Vladimir Viktorovitch Dubatolov and Vladimir O. Gurko in 2004. It is found in Tajikistan (the southwestern Pamirs).

This species was moved from the genus Oroncus to Arctia as a result of phylogenetic research published by Rönkä et al. in 2016.
