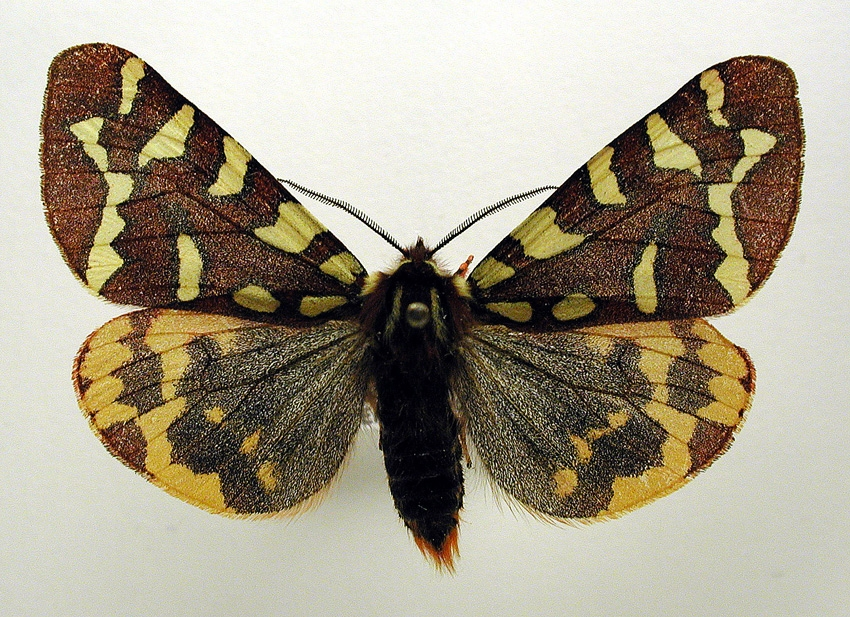

Scientific classification
- Kingdom: Animalia
- Phylum: Arthropoda
- Class: Insecta
- Order: Lepidoptera
- Superfamily: Noctuoidea
- Family: Erebidae
- Subfamily: Arctiinae
- Genus: Arctia
- Species: A. lapponica

Binomial name
- Arctia lapponica (Thunberg, 1791)

Synonyms
- Pararctia lapponica (Thunberg, 1791); Bombyx lapponica Thunberg, 1791; Hyphoraia lapponica; Bombyx festiva Borkhausen, 1790; Bombyx avia Hübner, [1808]; Hyphoraia festiva rosea Sheljuzhko, 1929; Arctia festiva lemniscata Stichel, 1911; Euprepia hyperboreus Curtis, 1835

= Arctia lapponica =

Species of moth

Arctia lapponica is a moth of the family Erebidae first described by Carl Peter Thunberg in 1791. It is found in northern Eurasia and the Arctic part of North America.

The wingspan is 37–45 mm.

The larvae feed on Betula nana, Vaccinium uliginosum and Rubus chamaemorus.

This species was formerly a member of the genus Pararctia, but was moved to Arctia along with the other species of the genera Acerbia, Pararctia, Parasemia, Platarctia, and Platyprepia.

== Subspecies ==
- Arctia lapponica lapponica (Polar Eurasia)
- Arctia lapponica lemniscata (Stichel, 1911) (mountains of eastern Yakutia)
- Arctia lapponica hyperborea (Curtis, 1835)
- Arctia lapponica gibsoni (Bang-Haas, 1927)
