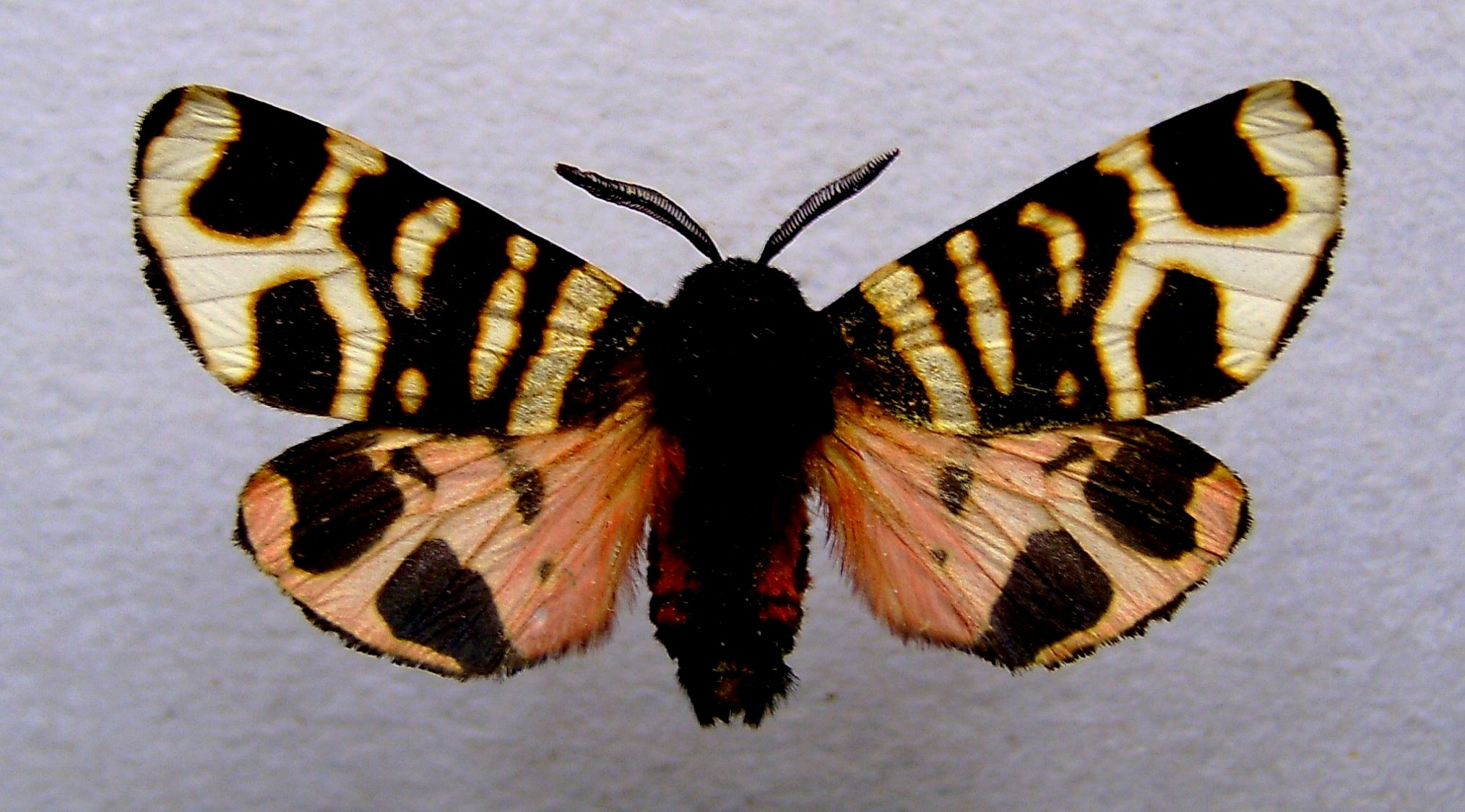
- Imago

Scientific classification
- Kingdom: Animalia
- Phylum: Arthropoda
- Clade: Pancrustacea
- Class: Insecta
- Order: Lepidoptera
- Superfamily: Noctuoidea
- Family: Erebidae
- Subfamily: Arctiinae
- Genus: Arctia
- Species: A. festiva

Binomial name
- Arctia festiva (Hufnagel, 1766)

Synonyms
- Eucharia festiva (Hufnagel, 1766)

= Arctia festiva =

Hebe tiger moth

Species of moth

Arctia festiva, the hebe tiger moth, is a moth species of the family Erebidae. Some authors have separated it in a monotypic genus Eucharia. It is found in Central and Southern Europe, Near East, Iran, Central Asia, European Russia, Southern Siberia, Mongolia and China.

The adults of this species display polymorphism; in addition, several subspecies are recognized. The wingspan is 45–60 mm. The moth flies February to July depending on the location, mainly in spring.

The caterpillar feeds on a wide range of plants.

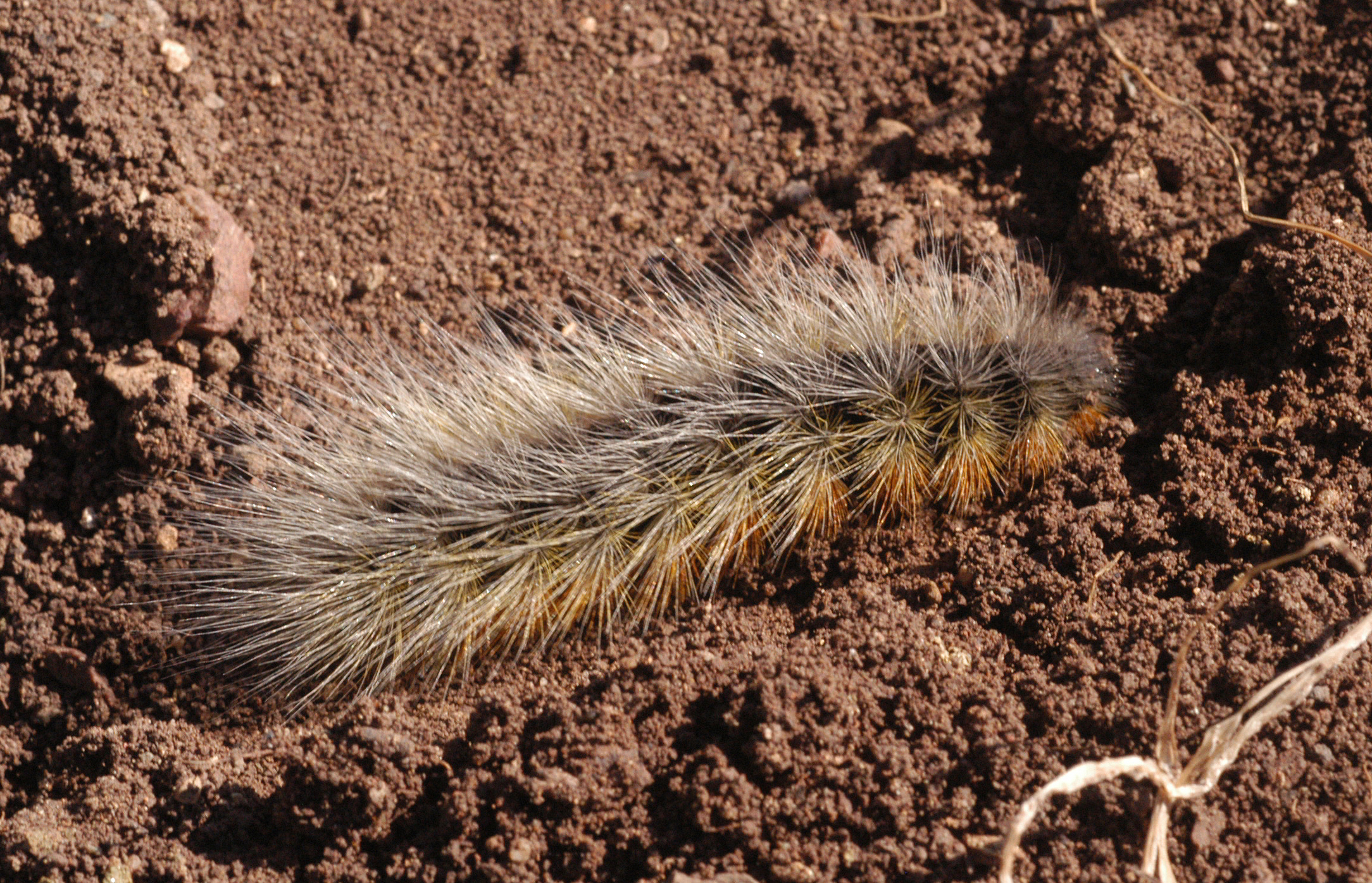
Caterpillar
