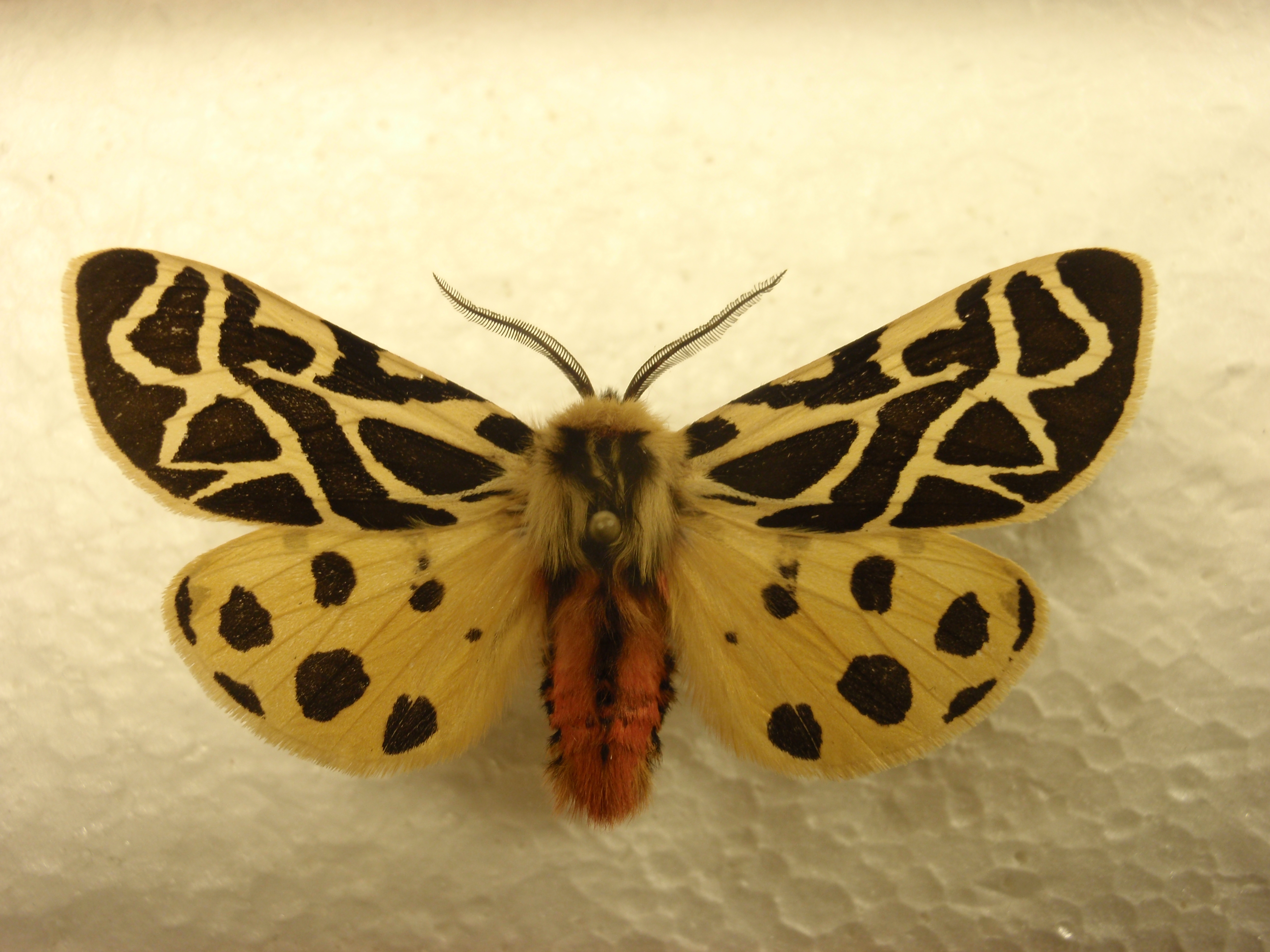

Scientific classification
- Kingdom: Animalia
- Phylum: Arthropoda
- Clade: Pancrustacea
- Class: Insecta
- Order: Lepidoptera
- Superfamily: Noctuoidea
- Family: Erebidae
- Subfamily: Arctiinae
- Genus: Arctia
- Species: A. romanovi

Binomial name
- Arctia romanovi Grum-Grshimailo, 1891

Synonyms
- Preparctia romanovi (Grum-Grshimailo, 1891); Preparctia romanovi f. biconfluens Bang-Haas, 1939; Preparctia romanovi f. confluens Bang-Haas, 1939; Preparctia romanovi ab. flava Bang-Haas, 1930; Preparctia romanovi f. rubrobasalis Bang-Haas, 1939

= Arctia romanovi =

Species of moth

Arctia romanovi is a moth in the family Erebidae. It was described by Grigory Grum-Grshimailo in 1891. It is found in the north-western Chinese province of Qinghai.

This species, along with the others of the genus Preparctia, was moved to Arctia as a result of phylogenetic research published by Rönkä et al. in 2016.
