= Arctia tancrei =

Scientific classification
- Kingdom: Animalia
- Phylum: Arthropoda
- Clade: Pancrustacea
- Class: Insecta
- Order: Lepidoptera
- Superfamily: Noctuoidea
- Family: Erebidae
- Subfamily: Arctiinae
- Genus: Arctia
- Species: A. tancrei

Binomial name
- Arctia tancrei Staudinger, 1887

Synonyms
- Oroncus tancrei (Staudinger, 1887); Phragmatobia urania Püngeler, 1904; Oroncus tancrei urania; Oroncus alaica O. Bang-Haas, 1927; Oroncus fasciata O. Bang-Haas, 1927

Species of moth

Arctia tancrei is a moth of the family Erebidae. It was described by Staudinger in 1887. It is found in Kazakhstan, Uzbekistan, Tajikistan, Kyrgyzstan and China.

This species, along with the others of the genus Oroncus, was moved to Arctia as a result of phylogenetic research published by Rönkä et al. in 2016.

== Subspecies ==
- Arctia tancrei tancrei (Kyrghyzstan: Inner and Central Tien Shan; China: Xinjiang)
- Arctia tancrei alaica O.Bang-Haas, 1927 (Uzbekistan and Tajikistan: Turkestan mountain range; Kyrghyzstan: Alai; Trans-Alai: Zaalaiskii Mountains; Tajikistan: Pamir Mountains)
- Arctia tancrei fasciata O.Bang-Haas, 1927 (eastern Kazakhstan: Dzhungarian Alatau Mountains)
