= Arctia ornata =

Scientific classification
- Kingdom: Animalia
- Phylum: Arthropoda
- Class: Insecta
- Order: Lepidoptera
- Superfamily: Noctuoidea
- Family: Erebidae
- Subfamily: Arctiinae
- Genus: Arctia
- Species: A. ornata

Binomial name
- Arctia ornata Staudinger, 1896

Synonyms
- Platarctia ornata (Staudinger, 1896); Hyphoraia ornata atropurpurea Bang-Haas, 1927; Platarctia atropurpurea (Staudinger, 1896)

Species of moth

Arctia ornata is a moth in the family Erebidae. It was described by Otto Staudinger in 1896. It is found in the Russian Far East (Yenisei River, Altai, Sayan, Tuva, Transbaikalia, Yakutia, southern Magadan) and Mongolia.

== Subspecies ==
- Arctia ornata ornata
- Arctia ornata sotavaltai Dubatolov, 1996 (Russia: mountains eastern Yakutia, southern Magadan)
