= Arctia murzini =

Scientific classification
- Kingdom: Animalia
- Phylum: Arthropoda
- Clade: Pancrustacea
- Class: Insecta
- Order: Lepidoptera
- Superfamily: Noctuoidea
- Family: Erebidae
- Subfamily: Arctiinae
- Genus: Arctia
- Species: A. murzini

Binomial name
- Arctia murzini (Dubatolov, 2005)

Synonyms
- Platarctia murzini Dubatolov, 2005

Species of moth

Arctia murzini is a moth in the family Erebidae. It was described by Vladimir Viktorovitch Dubatolov in 2005. It is found in Shaanxi, China.

This species was formerly a member of the genus Platarctia, but was moved to Arctia along with the other species of the genera Acerbia, Pararctia, Parasemia, Platarctia, and Platyprepia.
