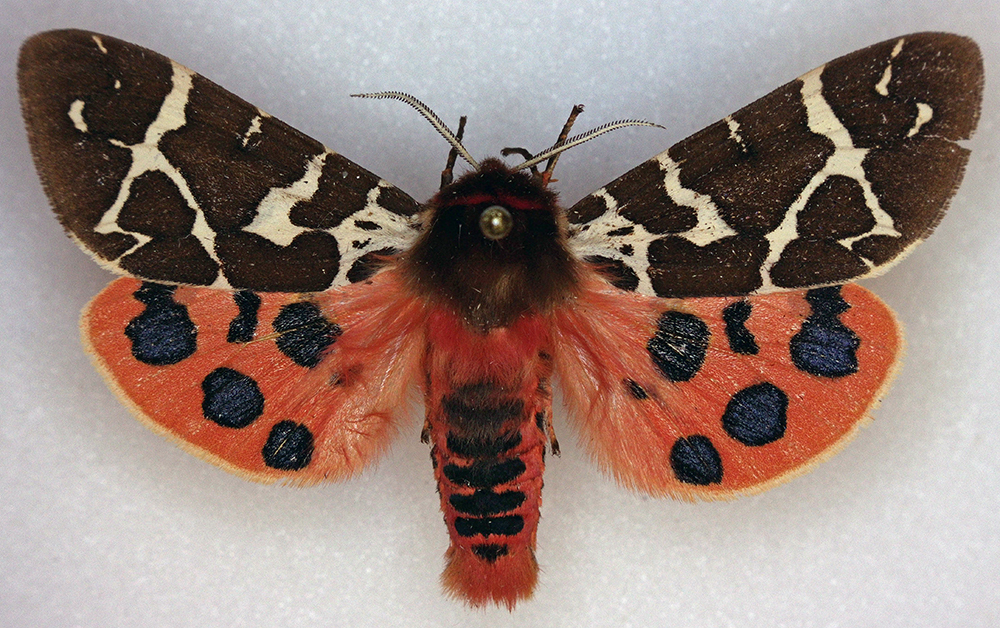

Scientific classification
- Kingdom: Animalia
- Phylum: Arthropoda
- Class: Insecta
- Order: Lepidoptera
- Superfamily: Noctuoidea
- Family: Erebidae
- Subfamily: Arctiinae
- Genus: Arctia
- Species: A. opulenta

Binomial name
- Arctia opulenta (H. Edwards, 1881)

Synonyms
- Euprepia opulenta H. Edwards, 1881; Arctia virginivir Dyar, 1923; Arctia caja parva Rothschild, 1910

= Arctia opulenta =

Species of moth

Arctia opulenta, also known as the opulent tiger moth, is a moth of the family Erebidae. It was described by Henry Edwards in 1881. It is found from Alaska through northern British Columbia to Labrador in arctic tundra and alpine and subalpine tundra habitats.

While Arctia opulenta is visually similar to the garden tiger moth, they are distinct species. Arctia opulenta can be differentiated from the garden tiger moth by its small size and eyes.

The adult moths of this species are diurnal. The length of the forewings is about 25 mm (0.98 in).

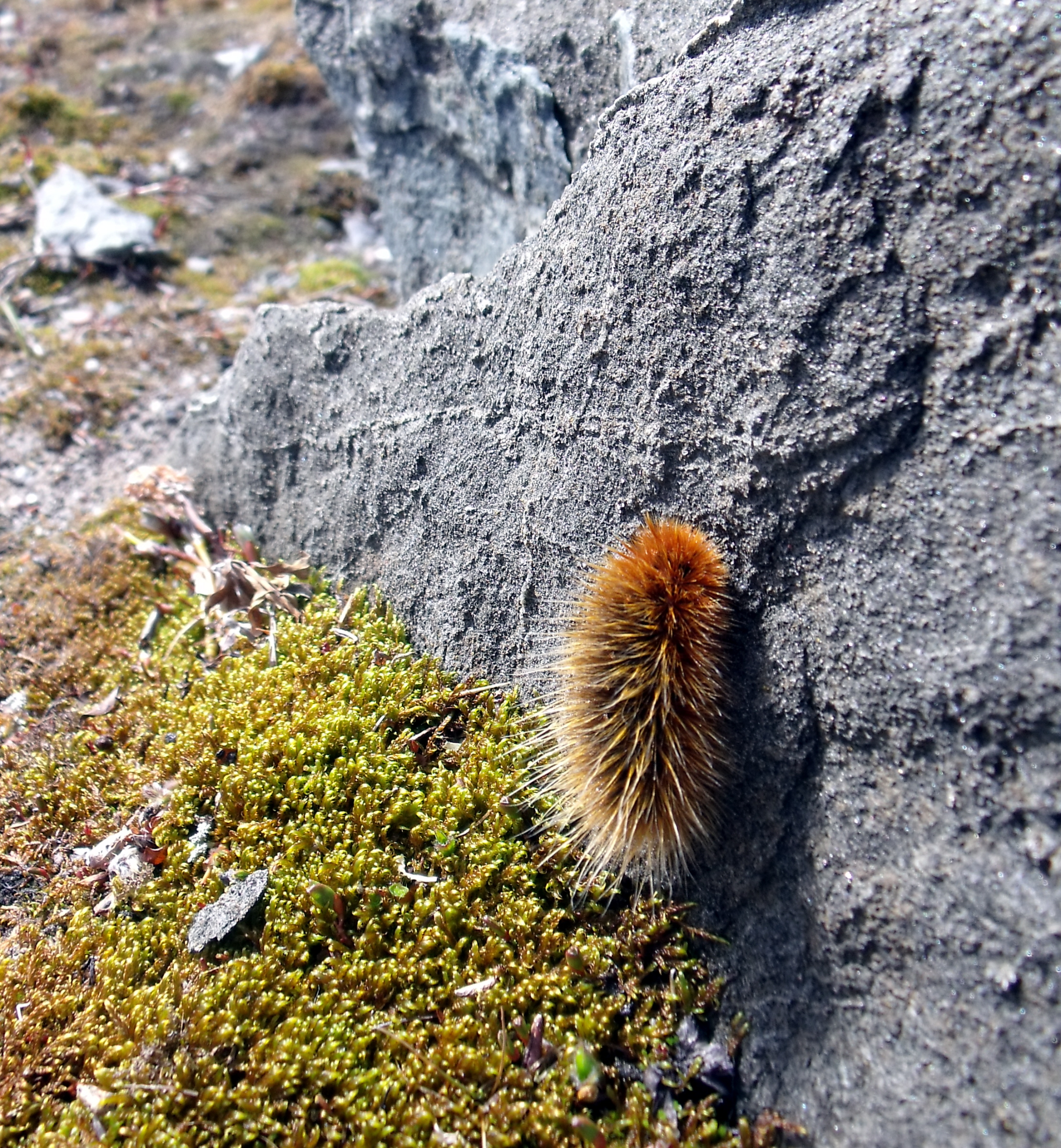
larva, Baffin Island

The larvae feed on Salix species.
