= Arctia olschwangi =

Scientific classification
- Kingdom: Animalia
- Phylum: Arthropoda
- Clade: Pancrustacea
- Class: Insecta
- Order: Lepidoptera
- Superfamily: Noctuoidea
- Family: Erebidae
- Subfamily: Arctiinae
- Genus: Arctia
- Species: A. olschwangi

Binomial name
- Arctia olschwangi Dubatolov, 1990

Species of moth

Arctia olschwangi is a moth of the family Erebidae. It was described by Vladimir Viktorovitch Dubatolov in 1990. It is found in the polar Ural, Yamal Peninsula, Yakutia, Lena River delta.
