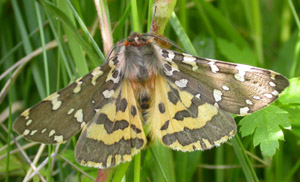
- Male

Scientific classification
- Domain: Eukaryota
- Kingdom: Animalia
- Phylum: Arthropoda
- Class: Insecta
- Order: Lepidoptera
- Superfamily: Noctuoidea
- Family: Erebidae
- Subfamily: Arctiinae
- Genus: Arctia
- Species: A. rueckbeili

Binomial name
- Arctia rueckbeili Püngeler, 1901

= Arctia rueckbeili =

Species of moth

Arctia rueckbeili is a moth of the family Erebidae first described by Rudolf Püngeler in 1901. It is found in Tien Shan, Alai and Turkestan mountains in Central Asia within Kyrgyzstan, Uzbekistan, Tajikistan, and Chinese province of Xinjiang at altitudes 1300–3500 m. The moth flies June to July.
