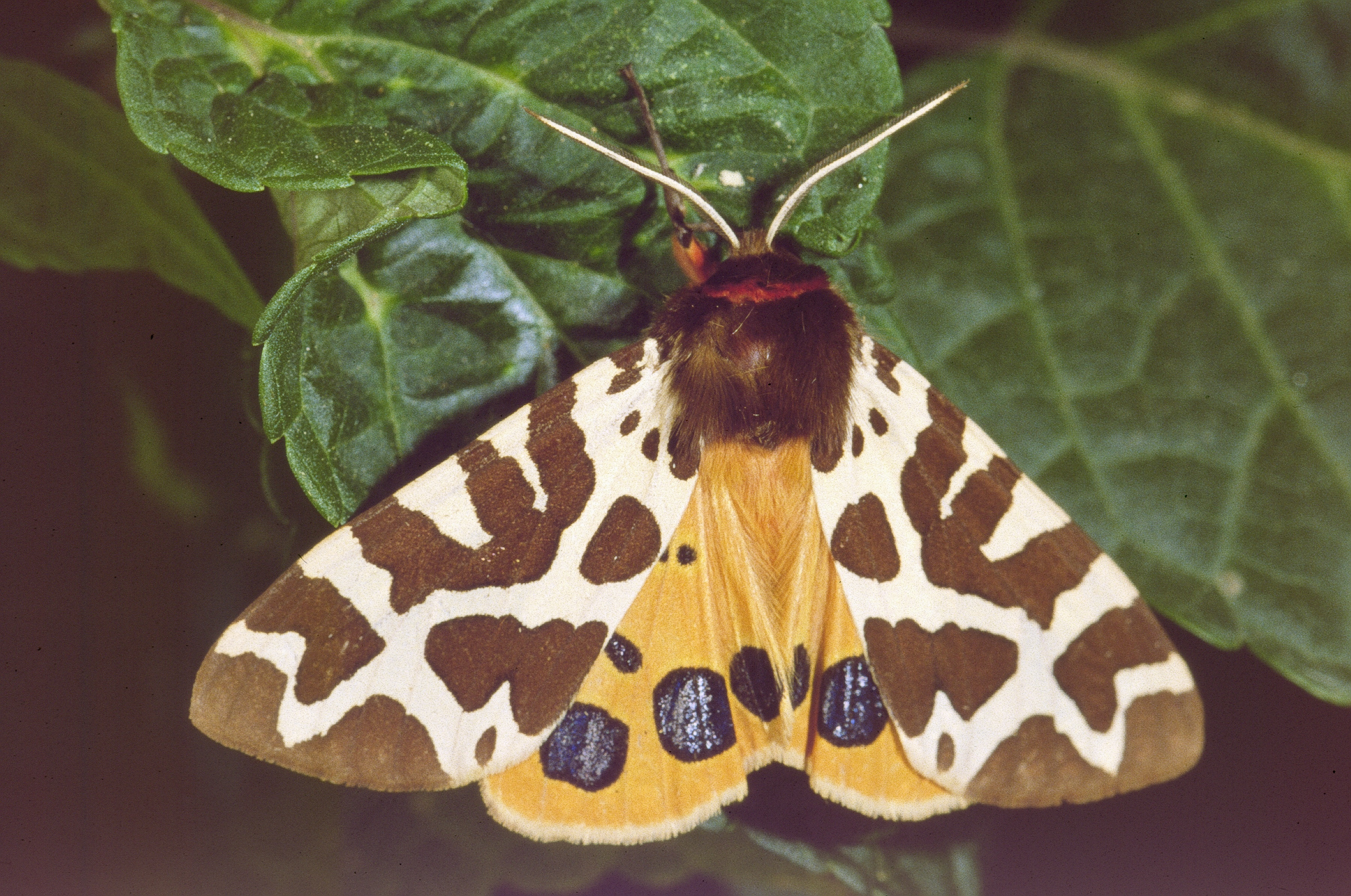
- Arctia caja imago

Scientific classification
- Kingdom: Animalia
- Phylum: Arthropoda
- Class: Insecta
- Order: Lepidoptera
- Superfamily: Noctuoidea
- Family: Erebidae
- Subfamily: Arctiinae
- Subtribe: Arctiina
- Genus: Arctia; Schrank, 1802

Synonyms
- Ammobiota Wallengren, 1885; Eucharia Hübner, [1820] (disputed)

= Arctia =

Genus of moths

Arctia is a genus of tiger moths in the family Erebidae. Therein, it belongs to the subtribe Arctiina in the tribe Arctiini in the subfamily Arctiinae. Species are well distributed throughout North America, Palearctic, India, and Sri Lanka.

As a result of phylogenetic studies by Rönkä et al. in 2016, the following genera were determined to be synonyms with Arctia, and their species were reclassified in this genus.

Acerbia
Ammobiota
Atlantarctia
Borearctia
Callarctia
Chionophila
Eupsychoma
Gonerda
Nemeophila
Oroncus
Pararctia
Platarctia
Platyprepia
Preparctia
Sinoarctia

== Description ==
Palpi porrect (extending forward), reaching beyond the frons where the first two joints are hairy. Antennae bipectinated in male, with short branches swollen at extremity, and with a terminal bristle, whereas female has serrate. Legs hairy with hind tibia bears two spur pairs. Forewings rather short and broad.

== Species ==
These species belong to the genus Arctia:

Arctia allardi (Oberthür, 1911)
Arctia alpina (Quensel, 1802)
Arctia aulica (Linnaeus, 1758) Lady-in-Waiting
Arctia brachyptera (Troubridge & Lafontaine, 1999) Kluane Tiger Moth
Arctia buddenbrocki (Kotzsch, 1929)
Arctia bundeli (Dubatolov & Gurko, 2004)
Arctia caja (Linnaeus, 1758) Garden Tiger Moth
Arctia churkini (Saldaitis, Ivinskis & Witt, 2003)
Arctia confluens (Romanoff, 1884)
Arctia cornuta (Saldaitis, Ivinskis & Witt, 2004)
Arctia cupido (Kishida, 1995)
Arctia dejeani (Godart, 1822)
Arctia dido (Wagner, 1841)
Arctia elisabethae (Kotzsch, 1939)
Arctia festiva (Hufnagel, 1766) Hebe Tiger Moth
Arctia flavia (Fuessly, 1779)
Arctia forsteri (Daniel, 1943)
Arctia gurkoi (Dubatolov, 2004)
Arctia hannyngtoni (Hampson, 1910)
Arctia intercalaris (Eversmann, 1843)
Arctia kasnakovi (Dubatolov, 1987)
Arctia khumbeli (Bang-Haas, 1927)
Arctia kolpakofskii (Alpheraky, 1882)
Arctia ladakensis (Bang-Haas, 1927)
Arctia lapponica (Thunberg, 1791) Lapland Tiger Moth
Arctia marchandi (de Freina, 1983)
Arctia martinhoneyi (Dubatolov & Gurko, 2005)
Arctia matronula (Linnaeus, 1758)
Arctia menetriesii (Eversmann, 1846)
Arctia mirifica (Oberthur, 1892)
Arctia murzini (Dubatolov, 2005)
Arctia oberthueri (Oberthür, 1890)
Arctia olschwangi (Dubatolov, 1990)
Arctia opulenta (Edwards, 1881) Opulent Tiger Moth
Arctia ornata (Staudinger, 1896)
Arctia parthenos (Harris, 1850) St. Lawrence Tiger Moth
Arctia perornata (Moore, 1879)
Arctia plantaginis (Linnaeus, 1758) Wood Tiger
Arctia romanovi (Grum-Grshimailo, 1891)
Arctia rueckbeili (Pungeler, 1901)
Arctia seitzi (Bang-Haas, 1910)
Arctia sieversi (Grum-Grshimailo, 1891)
Arctia souliei (Oberthur, 1903)
Arctia subnebulosa (Dyar, 1899)
Arctia tancrei (Staudinger, 1887)
Arctia testudinaria (Geoffroy, 1785) Patton's Tiger
Arctia thibetica (Felder, 1874)
Arctia tigrina (Villers, 1789)
Arctia tundrana (Tshistjakov, 1990)
Arctia ungemachi (Le Cerf, 1924)
Arctia villica (Linnaeus, 1758) Cream-spot Tiger
Arctia virginalis (Boisduval, 1852) Ranchman's Tiger Moth
Arctia weigerti (de Freina & Witt, 1985)
Arctia yarrowii (Stretch, 1874) Mountain Tiger Moth
