= Arctia sieversi =

Scientific classification
- Kingdom: Animalia
- Phylum: Arthropoda
- Class: Insecta
- Order: Lepidoptera
- Superfamily: Noctuoidea
- Family: Erebidae
- Subfamily: Arctiinae
- Genus: Arctia
- Species: A. sieversi

Binomial name
- Arctia sieversi Grum-Grshimailo, 1891

Synonyms
- Sinoarctia sieversi (Grum-Grshimailo, 1891)

Species of moth

Arctia sieversi is a moth in the family Erebidae. It was described by Grigory Grum-Grshimailo in 1891. It is found in Qinghai, China.

This species, along with the others of the genus Sinoarctia, was moved to Arctia as a result of phylogenetic research published by Rönkä et al. in 2016.
