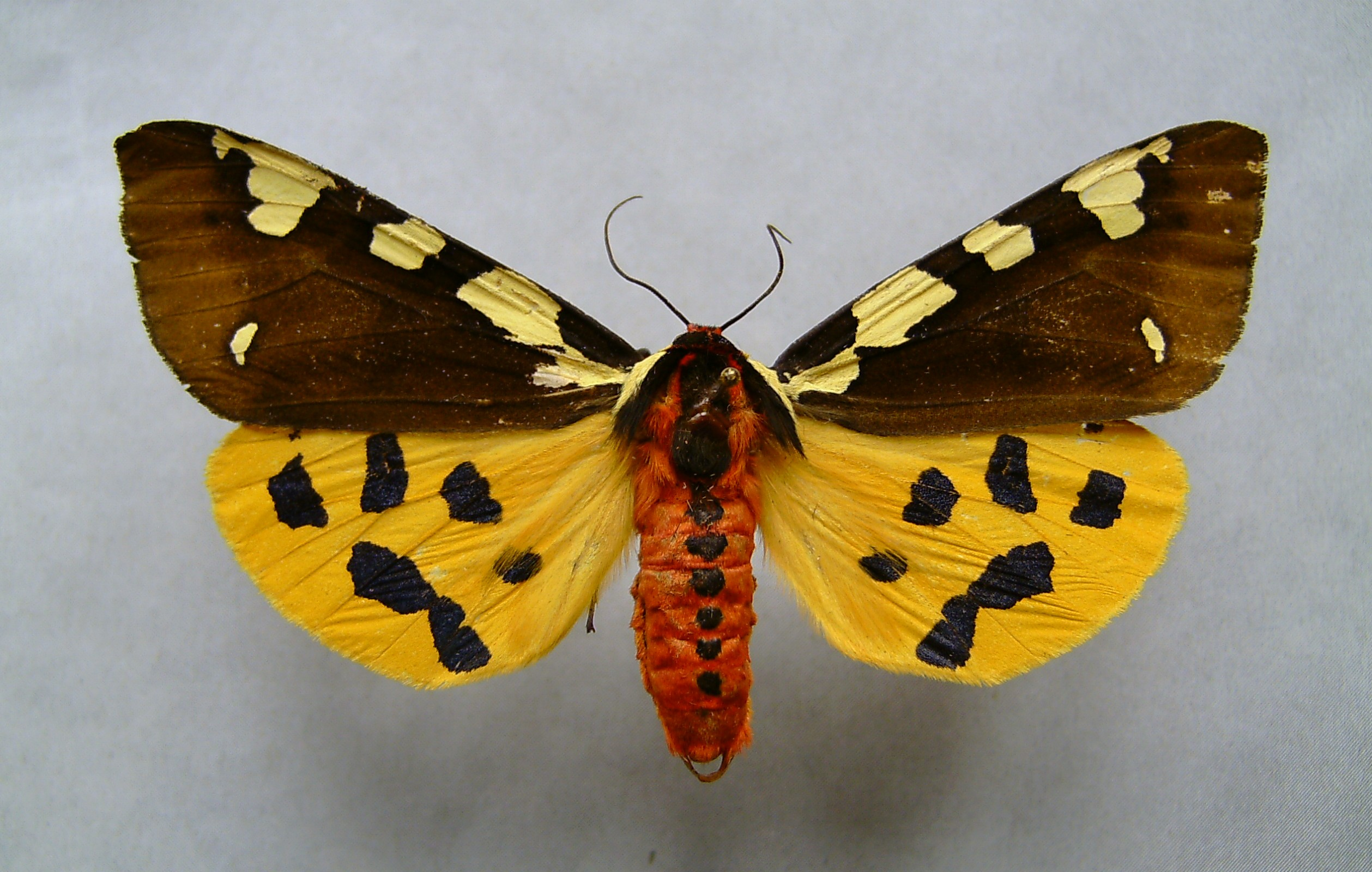

Scientific classification
- Kingdom: Animalia
- Phylum: Arthropoda
- Class: Insecta
- Order: Lepidoptera
- Superfamily: Noctuoidea
- Family: Erebidae
- Subfamily: Arctiinae
- Genus: Arctia
- Species: A. matronula

Binomial name
- Arctia matronula (Linnaeus, 1758)

Synonyms
- Pericallia matronula (Linnaeus, 1758); Phalaena matronula; Pleretes matronula agassizi

= Arctia matronula =

Moth genus and species

Arctia matronula is species of tiger moth in the family Erebidae. It was first described by Carl Linnaeus in his 1758 10th edition of Systema Naturae. It can be found in central and eastern Europe, Kazakhstan, southern Siberia, northern Mongolia, Amur Region, Primorye, Sakhalin, Kunashir, northern and northeastern China, Korea and Japan.

The larvae feed on Lonicera, Hieracium, Vaccinium, Fraxinus, Corylus, Quercus species and Prunus padus.

This species was moved to Arctia as a result of phylogenetic research published by Rönkä et al. in 2016.
