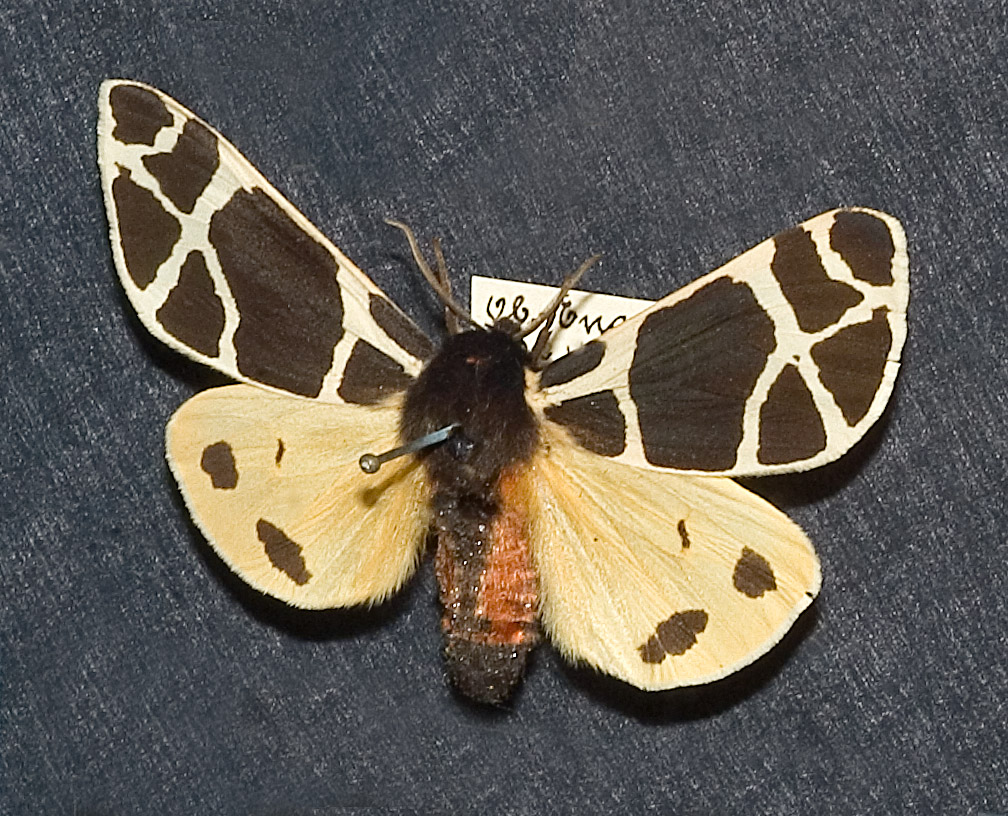

Scientific classification
- Domain: Eukaryota
- Kingdom: Animalia
- Phylum: Arthropoda
- Class: Insecta
- Order: Lepidoptera
- Superfamily: Noctuoidea
- Family: Erebidae
- Subfamily: Arctiinae
- Genus: Arctia
- Species: A. flavia

Binomial name
- Arctia flavia (Füssli, 1779)

= Arctia flavia =

Yellow tiger moth

Species of moth

Arctia flavia, the yellow tiger moth, is a moth of the family Erebidae. The species was first described by Johann Kaspar Füssli in 1779. It is found in the Alps above the tree level. It also occurs in Balkan mountains (Rila), European Russia, northern Kazakhstan, Siberia, Mongolia, north-eastern China, and Korea.

The wingspan is 50–70 mm. The moth flies July to August.

The larvae feed on a wide range of plants.
