= Arctia cupido =

Scientific classification
- Kingdom: Animalia
- Phylum: Arthropoda
- Class: Insecta
- Order: Lepidoptera
- Superfamily: Noctuoidea
- Family: Erebidae
- Subfamily: Arctiinae
- Genus: Arctia
- Species: A. cupido

Binomial name
- Arctia cupido (Kishida, 1995)

Synonyms
- Preparctia cupido Kishida, 1995

Species of moth

Arctia cupido is a moth in the family Erebidae. It was described by Yasunori Kishida in 1995. It is found in Nepal.

The species of the genus Preparctia, including this one, were moved to Arctia as a result of phylogenetic research published by Rönkä et al. in 2016.
