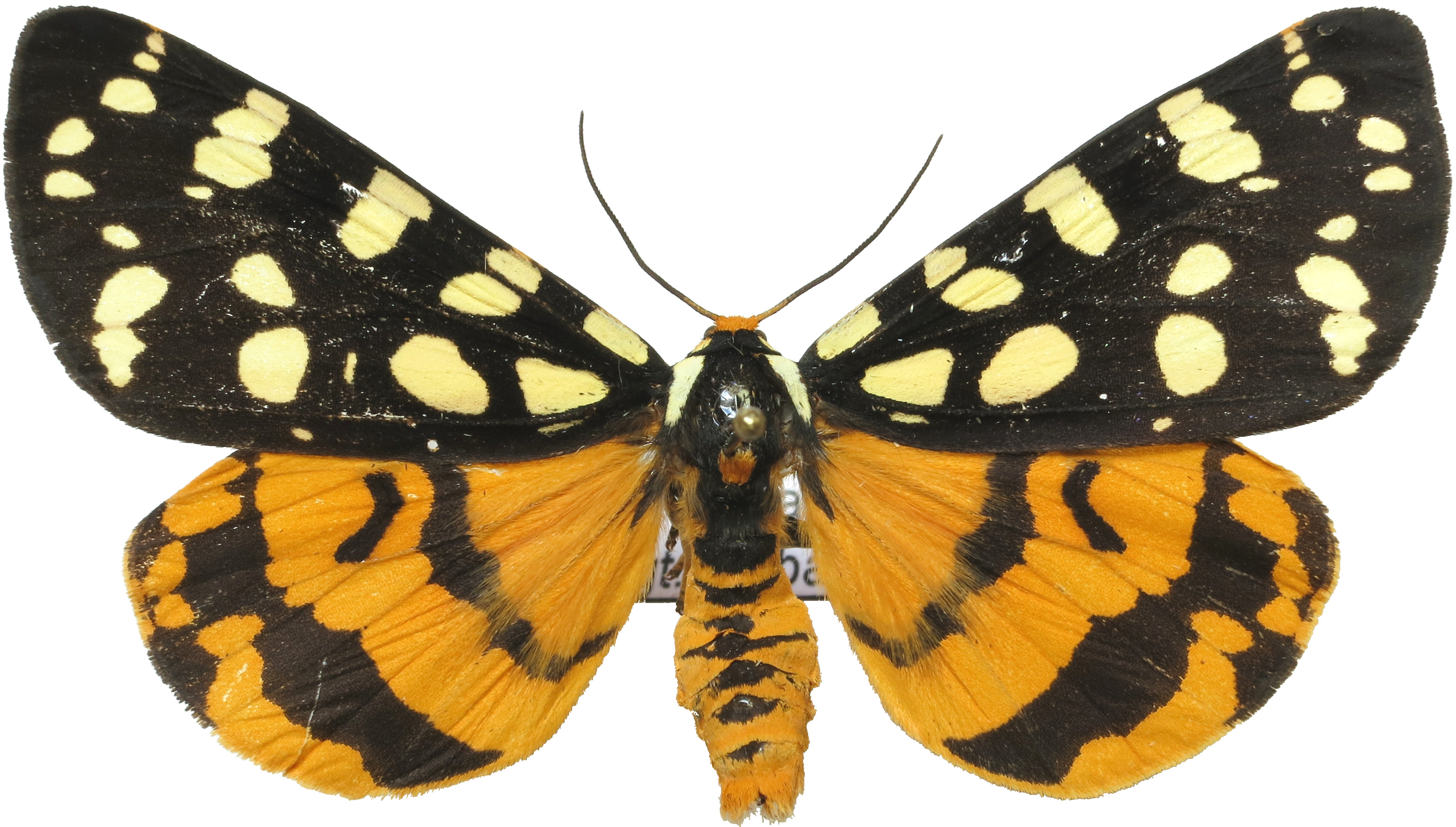
- From British Columbia, Canada

Scientific classification
- Domain: Eukaryota
- Kingdom: Animalia
- Phylum: Arthropoda
- Class: Insecta
- Order: Lepidoptera
- Superfamily: Noctuoidea
- Family: Erebidae
- Subfamily: Arctiinae
- Genus: Arctia; Schrank, 1802
- Species: A. virginalis

Binomial name
- Arctia virginalis (Boisduval, 1852)

Synonyms
- Platyprepia virginalis (Boisduval, 1852); Chelonia virginalis Boisduval, 1852; Agarista virginalis var. guttata Boisduval, 1852; Epicallia virginalis var. ochracea Stretch, 1872

= Arctia virginalis =

Species of moths

Arctia virginalis, the Ranchman's tiger moth, is a species of tiger moth in the family Erebidae. It was first described by Jean Baptiste Boisduval in 1852.

It is found in western North America, ranging from southern Monterey Bay in California across Nevada and southern Utah to Colorado and north to southern British Columbia. The habitat consists of wet lowland prairies, wet meadows, wet forests and in riparian zones along creeks in dry desert regions.

The length of the forewings is 26–31 mm. The forewings are black with numerous light yellow spots. The hindwings are variable in pattern, but are most commonly orange with broad irregular black bands. Adults are on wing in summer.

The larvae feed on a wide range of herbaceous plants. They are covered with dense long hairs. These hairs are orange at the head and tail and black in the central part.

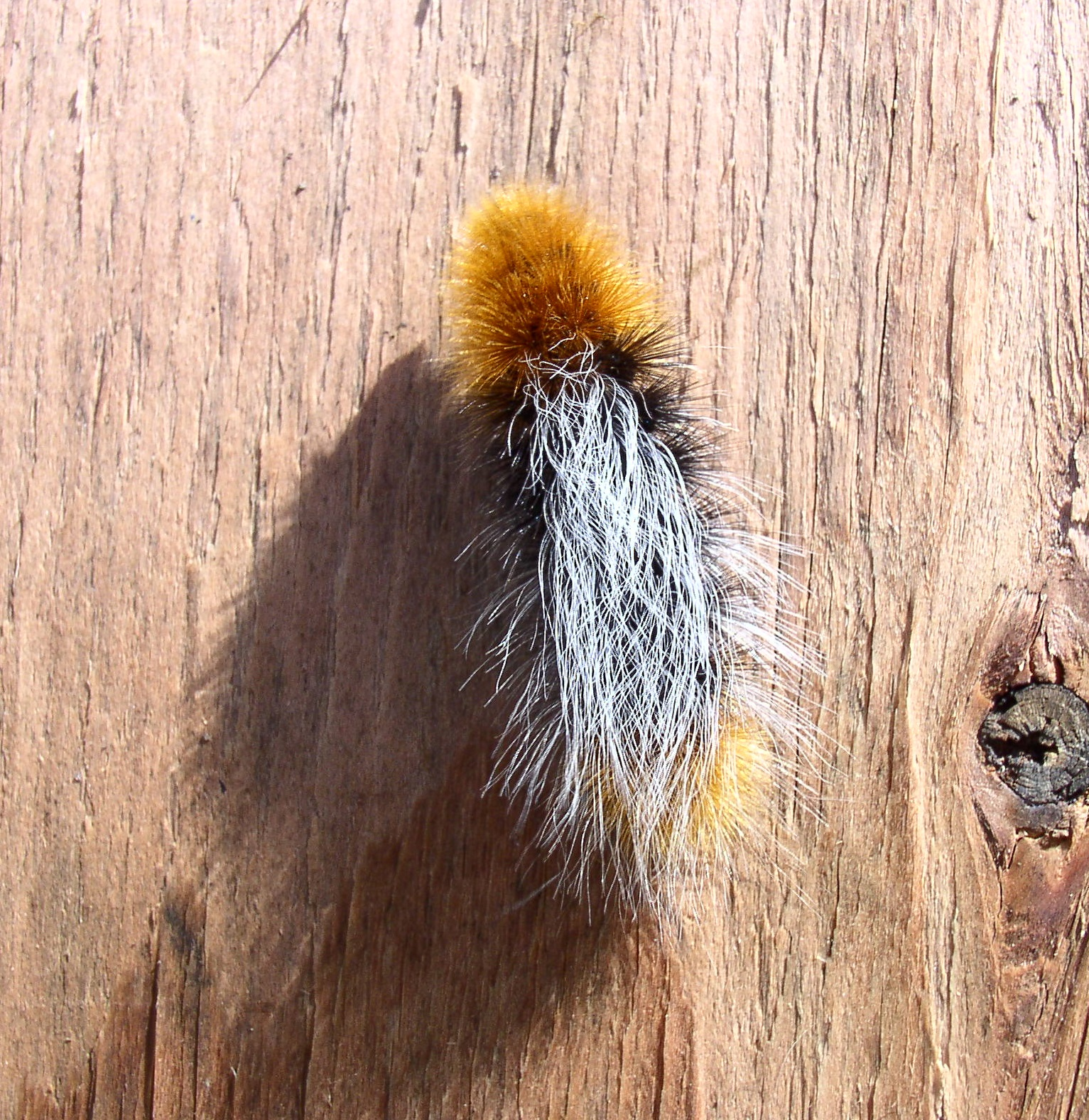
Caterpillar

This species was formerly a member of the genus Platyprepia, but was moved to Arctia along with the species of the genera Acerbia, Pararctia, Parasemia, and Platarctia.
