= Arctia hannyngtoni =

Scientific classification
- Kingdom: Animalia
- Phylum: Arthropoda
- Class: Insecta
- Order: Lepidoptera
- Superfamily: Noctuoidea
- Family: Erebidae
- Subfamily: Arctiinae
- Genus: Arctia
- Species: A. hannyngtoni

Binomial name
- Arctia hannyngtoni (Hampson, 1910)

Synonyms
- Preparctia hannyngtoni Hampson, 1910

Species of moth

Arctia hannyngtoni is a moth in the family Erebidae. It was described by George Hampson in 1910. It is found in the north-western Himalayas and Nepal.

The species of the genus Preparctia, including this one, were moved to Arctia as a result of phylogenetic research published by Rönkä et al. in 2016.
