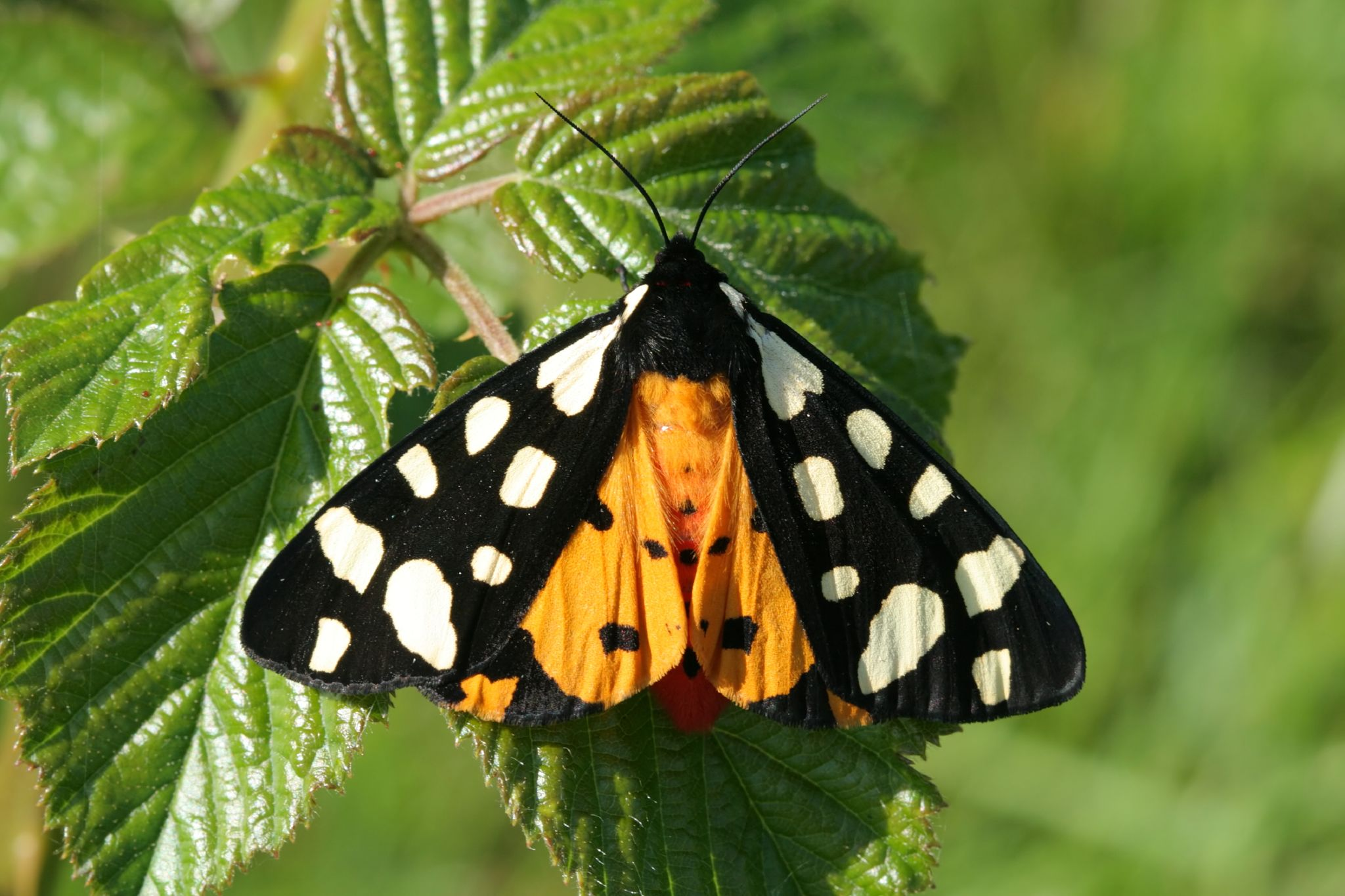

Scientific classification
- Kingdom: Animalia
- Phylum: Arthropoda
- Class: Insecta
- Order: Lepidoptera
- Superfamily: Noctuoidea
- Family: Erebidae
- Subfamily: Arctiinae
- Genus: Arctia
- Species: A. villica

Binomial name
- Arctia villica (Linnaeus, 1758)

Synonyms
- Epicallia villica (Linnaeus, 1758); Arctia villica meridionalis (Heinrich, 1923); Chelonia villica corsica (Oberthür, 1911); Chelonia villica nicaeensis (Oberthür, 1911); Phalaena bombyx vidua (Poda, 1761)

= Arctia villica =

Cream-spot tiger

Species of moth

Arctia villica, the cream-spot tiger, is a moth of the family Erebidae. The species was first described by Carl Linnaeus in his 1758 10th edition of Systema Naturae. It is distributed from the Iberian Peninsula, Anatolia, western and northern Iran, western Siberia, southwestern Asia and North Africa.

This species, along with the others of the genus Epicallia, was moved to Arctia as a result of phylogenetic research published by Rönkä et al. in 2016.

== Description ==
The wingspan of these moths reaches 45–60 mm. They have black or greyish forewings with white and cream broad patches and spots. The bright red/orange hind wings have black spots. The thorax is black and the abdomen is reddish-orange. The highly coloured parts are bright scarlet on a newly emerged insect and tend to dull to orange with age. The caterpillars are black with light brown tufts of hairs, while the head and the legs are reddish. They can reach a length of about 12–12 mm.

== Behaviour ==
The moths are nocturnal and attracted by light, but the females fly also during the day. By day these moths can be found resting on leaves. Moths of this species fly from March to July depending on the location.

The caterpillars feed on a variety of herbaceous plants, mainly dandelion (Taraxacum species), plantains (Plantago species), deadnettles (Lamium species), yarrow (Achillea species), blackberries (Rubus species), nettles (Urtica species), knapweeds (Centaurea species) and strawberries (Fragaria species).

They overwinter, but they are relatively sensitive to frost. They can be seen in the spring after hibernation while feeding or seeking for suitable places to pupate. They pupate in May on the ground.

== Habitat ==
This species inhabits woodland, areas with bushes and hedges and sunny open grassy areas.

== Subspecies ==
- Arctia villica confluens (Romanoff, 1884)
- Arctia villica villica (Linnaeus, 1758)
- Arctia villica angelica (Boisduval, 1829)
- Arctia villica fulminans (Staudinger, 1871)
- Arctia villica marchandi (de Freina, 1983)

== Philately ==
The cream-spot tiger appeared in 1992 on the German stamp of 100+50 pfennigs.

== Gallery ==
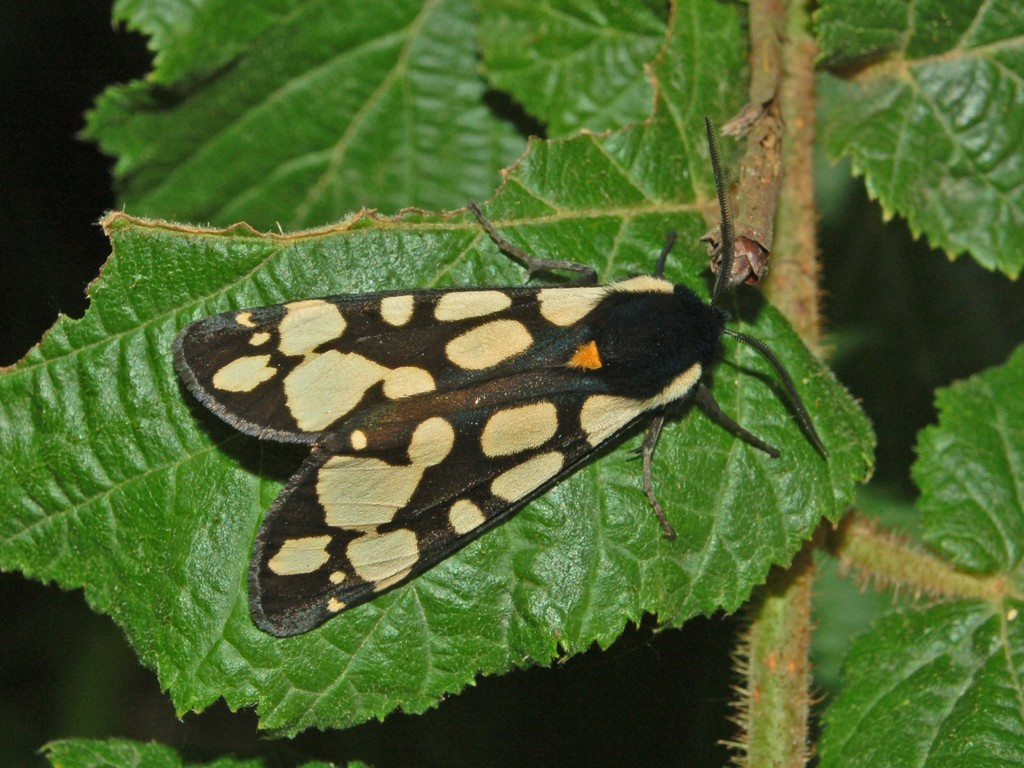
Imago

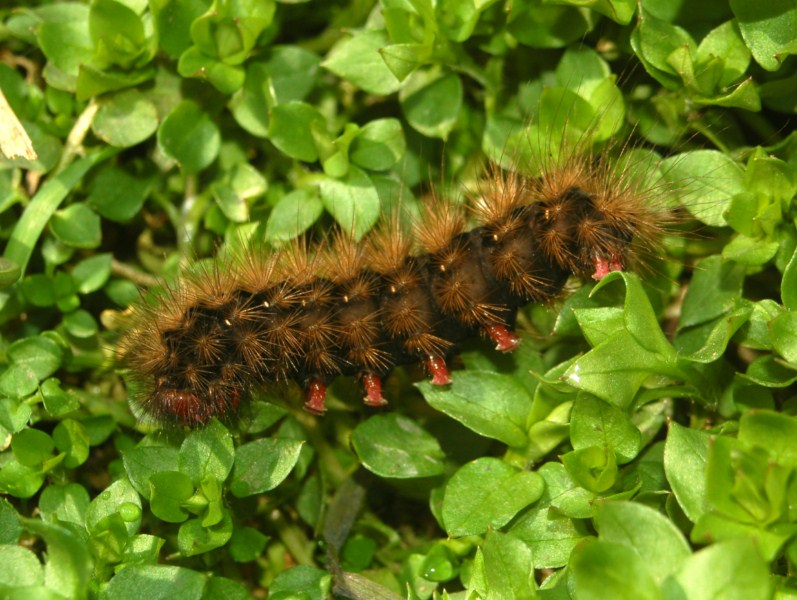
Caterpillar

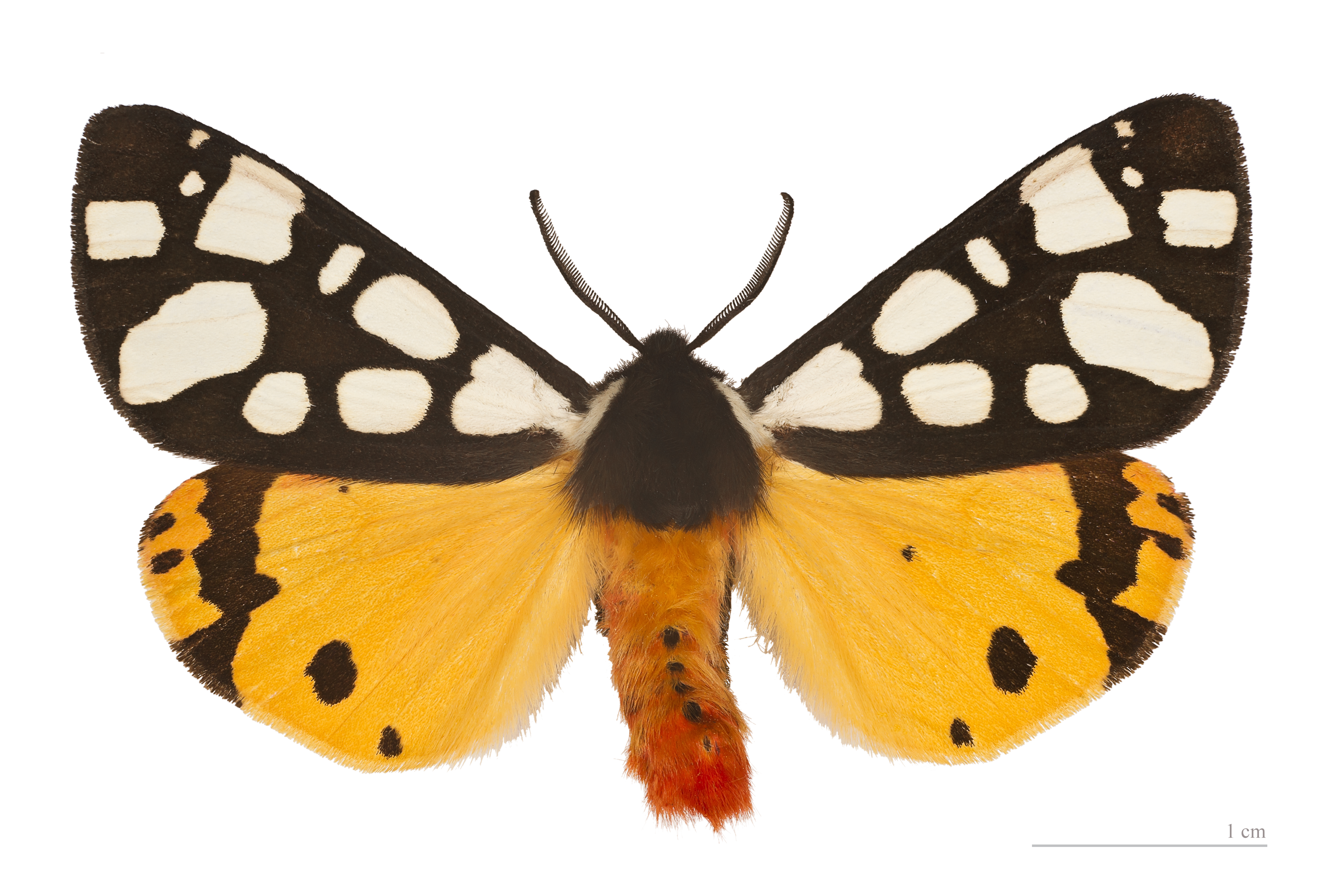
Museum specimen

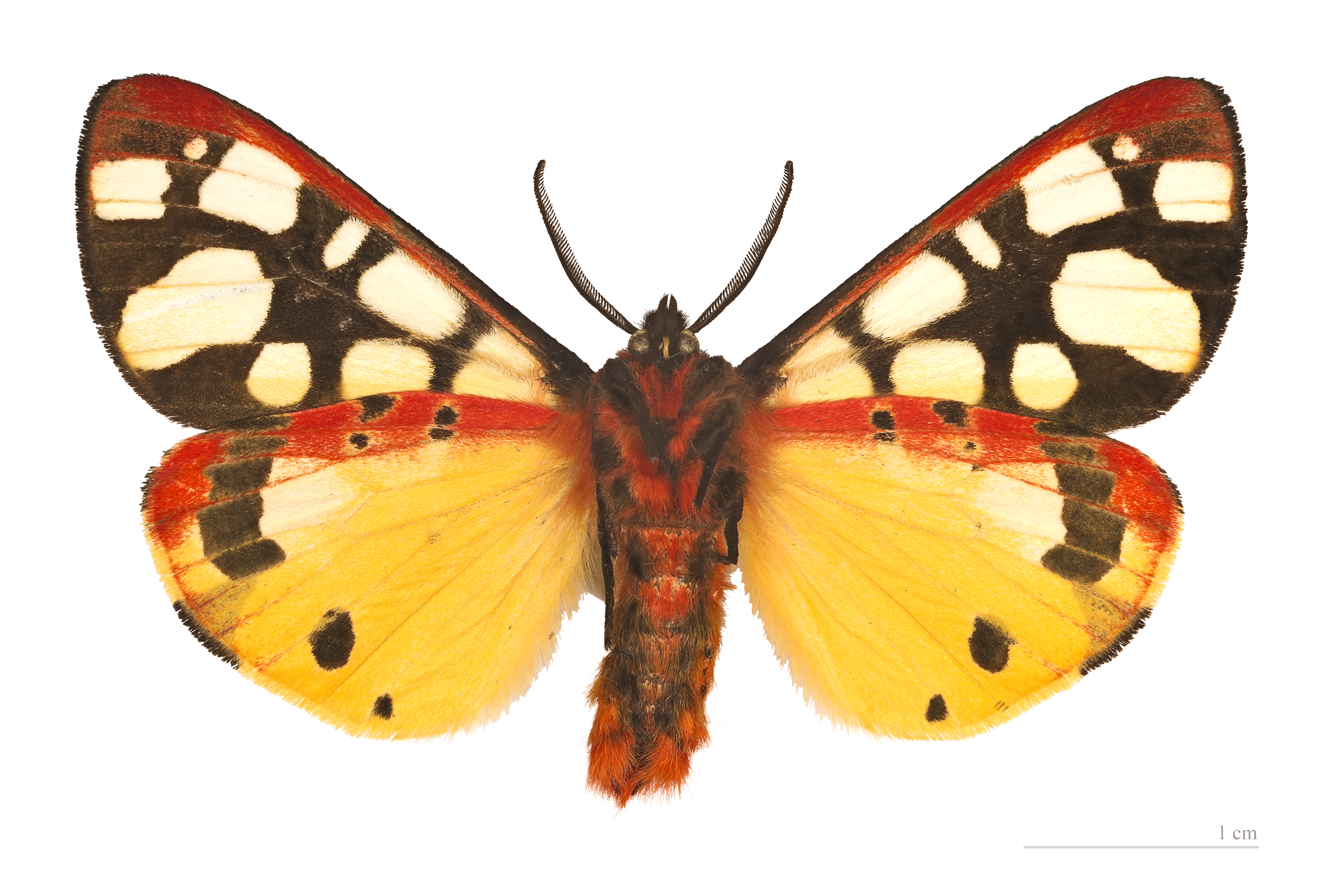
Underside - museum specimen
