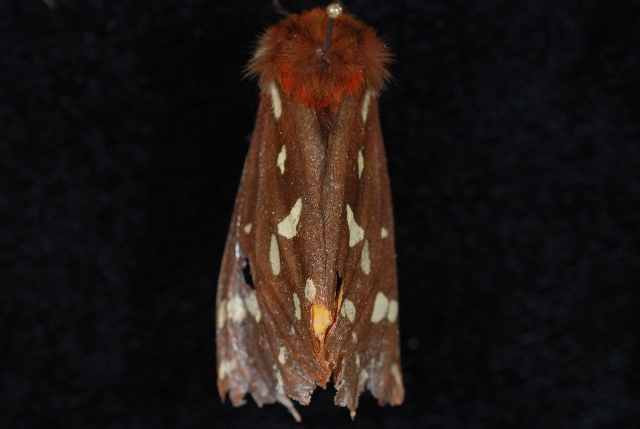

Scientific classification
- Kingdom: Animalia
- Phylum: Arthropoda
- Clade: Pancrustacea
- Class: Insecta
- Order: Lepidoptera
- Superfamily: Noctuoidea
- Family: Erebidae
- Subfamily: Arctiinae
- Genus: Arctia
- Species: A. parthenos

Binomial name
- Arctia parthenos Harris, 1850

Synonyms
- Platarctia parthenos (Harris, 1850); Hyphoraia parthenos; Arctia borealis Möschler, 1860; Parasemia parthenos parvimaculata Brower, 1973; Parasemia plantaginis multimaculata Brower, 1973; Parasemia plantaginis obsolescens Brower, 1973

= Arctia parthenos =

St. Lawrence tiger moth

Species of moth

Arctia parthenos, the St. Lawrence tiger moth, is a moth in the family Erebidae. It was described by Thaddeus William Harris in 1850. It is found in boreal North America, ranging from Alaska to Labrador, south to New Mexico and Arizona in the Rocky Mountains and to North Carolina in the Appalachian Mountains. The habitat consists of riparian areas and mixed hardwood-conifer forests at middle to high elevations.

The length of the forewings is 28–33 mm. Adults are on wing from late May until early August in one generation per year.

The larvae feed on various plants, including Salix, Alnus and Betula species.

This species was formerly a member of the genus Platarctia, but was moved to Arctia along with the other species of the genera Acerbia, Pararctia, Parasemia, Platarctia, and Platyprepia.

In an influential map by entomologist and cartographer Moses Harris published in The Gentleman's Magazine in 1750, this species is depicted alongside the North American White Admiral (Limenitis arthemis) and an unidentified Cerambycid. Within the map, the moth is erroneously labelled as the "Orange Underwing Tygre" – representing a potential case of cartographic imperialism.
