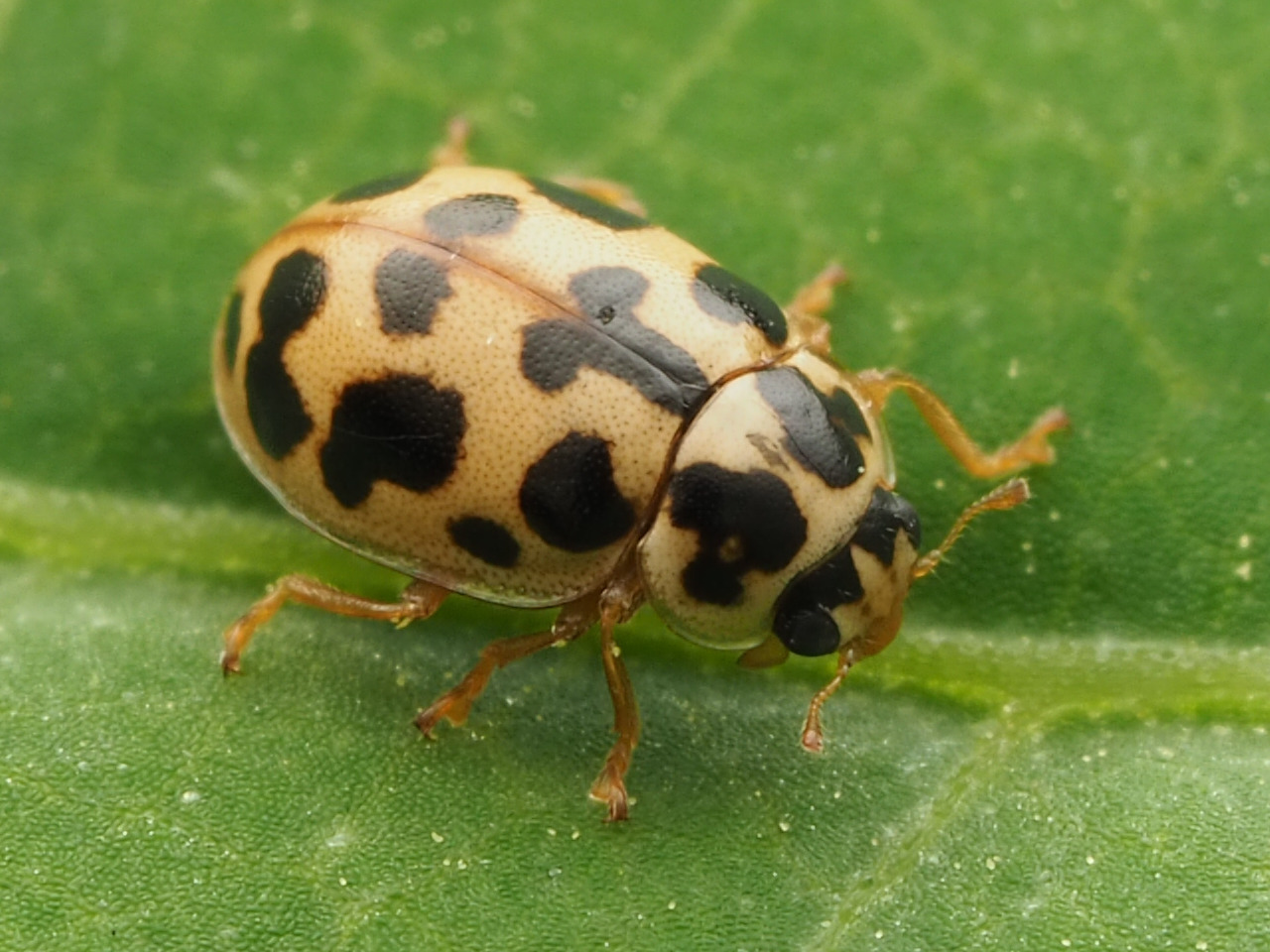

Scientific classification
- Kingdom: Animalia
- Phylum: Arthropoda
- Clade: Pancrustacea
- Class: Insecta
- Order: Coleoptera
- Suborder: Polyphaga
- Infraorder: Cucujiformia
- Family: Coccinellidae
- Genus: Anisosticta
- Species: A. bitriangularis

Binomial name
- Anisosticta bitriangularis (Say, 1824)

Synonyms
- Coccinella bitriangularis Say, 1824; Coccinella multiguttata Randall, 1838; Anisosticta novemdecimpunctata var. irregularis Weise, 1879

= Anisosticta bitriangularis =

Species of beetle

Anisosticta bitriangularis, known generally as the marsh lady beetle or swamp lady beetle, is a species of lady beetle in the family Coccinellidae. It is found in Europe and Northern Asia (excluding China) and North America (Labrador to New Jersey, west to Alaska, California and British Columbia).

== Description ==
Adults reach a length of about 3-4 mm.
