= Arctia brachyptera =

Conservation status
- Critically Imperiled (NatureServe)

Scientific classification
- Domain: Eukaryota
- Kingdom: Animalia
- Phylum: Arthropoda
- Class: Insecta
- Order: Lepidoptera
- Superfamily: Noctuoidea
- Family: Erebidae
- Subfamily: Arctiinae
- Genus: Arctia
- Species: A. brachyptera

Binomial name
- Arctia brachyptera Troubridge & Lafontaine, 2000

Species of moth

Arctia brachyptera, the Kluane tiger moth, is a moth of the family Erebidae. It was described by James T. Troubridge and J. Donald Lafontaine in 2000 and is only known from the Yukon in Canada. It occurs in alpine tundra of the Saint Elias Mountains.
