= Arctia seitzi =

Scientific classification
- Kingdom: Animalia
- Phylum: Arthropoda
- Class: Insecta
- Order: Lepidoptera
- Superfamily: Noctuoidea
- Family: Erebidae
- Subfamily: Arctiinae
- Genus: Arctia
- Species: A. seitzi

Binomial name
- Arctia seitzi (A. Bang-Haas, 1910)

Synonyms
- Acerbia seitzi (A.Bang-Haas, 1910); Hyphoraia seitzi A.Bang-Haas, 1910; Arctia strandi Niepelt, 1911; Phragmatobia niepeltiana Strand, 1919

Species of moth

Arctia seitzi is a moth of the family Erebidae. It was described by Andreas Bang-Haas in 1910. It is found in central Asia, including Kazakhstan and Kirghizia.

This species was formerly a member of the genus Acerbia, but was moved to Arctia along with the other species of the genera Acerbia, Pararctia, Parasemia, Platarctia, and Platyprepia.

== Subspecies ==
- Arctia seitzi seitzi
- Arctia seitzi micropuncta Saldaitis, Ivinskis & Witt, 2004 (Kirghizia)
