= Archepandemis borealis =

Scientific classification
- Domain: Eukaryota
- Kingdom: Animalia
- Phylum: Arthropoda
- Class: Insecta
- Order: Lepidoptera
- Family: Tortricidae
- Genus: Archepandemis
- Species: A. borealis

Binomial name
- Archepandemis borealis (Freeman, 1965)

Synonyms
- Parapandemis borealis Freeman, 1965; Pandemis borealis

Species of moth

Archepandemis borealis is a species of moth of the family Tortricidae. It is found in North America, where it has been recorded from Ontario and Maine.
