= Hans Kotzsch =

German entomologist

Hans Kotzsch (24 April 1901, Dresden (Loschwitz) - 25 July 1950 Dresden (Blasewitz)) was a German entomologist who specialised in Lepidoptera.

From 1925 Kotzsch owned the entomological dealership "Hermann Wernicke" in Dresden. From here he sold insects collected on his many collecting trips (Rybachy Peninsula (1933), Armenia (1934), Hindu Kush (1936), Iran and Afghanistan (1939) Turkey and China. Many of his specimens are in Museum Alexander Koenig in Bonn and in Museum für Naturkunde Berlin. In 1948 two years before his death he purchased the business collection "Staudinger" - Bang-Haas from the widow of Otto Bang-Haas. Like most dealers of his time Kotzsch described many new subspecies of "exotic" butterflies, particularly from South America. Most are these are unsound but his taxonomic work on Palaearctic fauna is much better.

== Works ==
Beginning list

- 1929 Nue Falter aus dem Richthofengebirge Entomologische Zeitschrift 43 (16): 204-206, fig. 1-10.
- 1936 Ein Sommer unter den Kurden. Ent. Rundsch. 53: 313-317
- 1939 Neue Weibform von Baronia brevicornis Salv. Entomologische Zeitschrift 53(46):360.
- 1936. Falternenbreiten aus meiner Hindukusch-Expedition Entomologische Rundschau. Bd. 54.5. S. 50–52.
- 1939. Weitere Falterneuheiten aus meiner Hindukusch-Expedition 1936 Entomologische Rundschau 55 (1): 9-10.
