= Ivinskis =

Ivinskis is a surname. Notable people with the surname include:

- Laurynas Ivinskis (1810–1881), Lithuanian teacher, publisher, translator, and lexicographer
- Zenonas Ivinskis (1908–1971), Lithuanian historian
