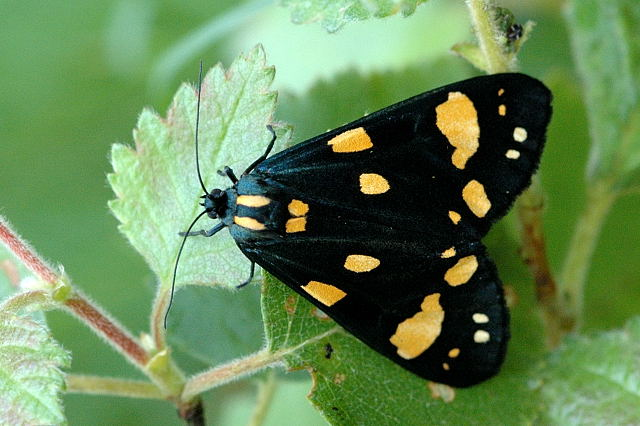
- Callimorpha dominula

Scientific classification
- Kingdom: Animalia
- Phylum: Arthropoda
- Class: Insecta
- Order: Lepidoptera
- Superfamily: Noctuoidea
- Family: Erebidae
- Subfamily: Arctiinae
- Subtribe: Callimorphina
- Genus: Callimorpha; Latreille, 1809

= Callimorpha =

Genus of moths

Callimorpha is a genus of tiger moths in the family Erebidae.

== Species ==
The genus includes the following species.

- Callimorpha dominula Linnaeus, 1758

== Species formerly placed in Callimorpha ==
- Callimorpha quadripunctaria Linnaeus, 1758
- Callimorpha mesogona
- Callimorpha carolina
- Callimorpha terminata
- Callimorpha reversa
- Callimorpha bellatrix
