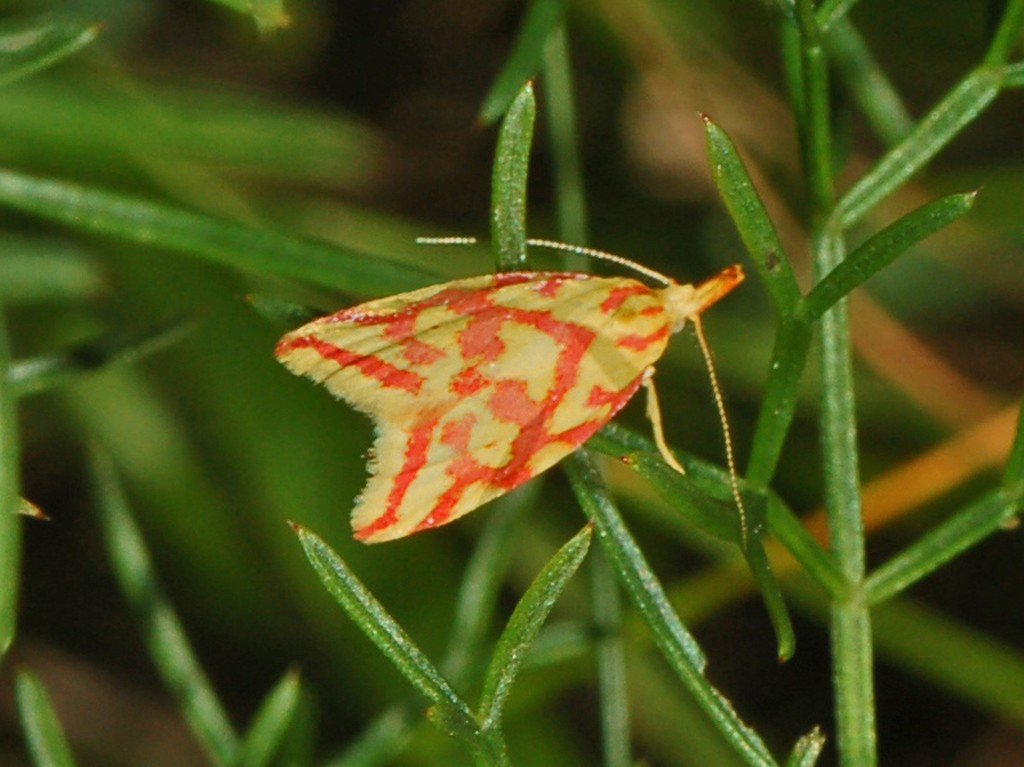
- Hypercallia citrinalis
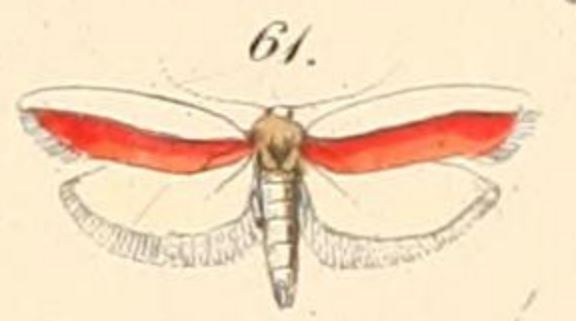
- Hypercallia haematella

Scientific classification
- Kingdom: Animalia
- Phylum: Arthropoda
- Clade: Pancrustacea
- Class: Insecta
- Order: Lepidoptera
- Family: Oecophoridae
- Subfamily: Oecophorinae
- Genus: Hypercallia; Stephens, 1829

Type species
- Phalaena christiernana Linnaeus, 1767

Species
- See text

Synonyms
- Agriocoma Zeller, 1877; Brachyplatea Zeller, 1877; Eumimographe Dognin, 1905

= Hypercallia =

Genus of moths

Hypercallia is a genus of gelechioid moths.

== Taxonomy ==
In some systematic layouts, it is placed in the subfamily Amphisbatinae of the concealer moth family (Oecophoridae). Delimitation of Amphisbatinae versus the closely related Depressariinae and Oecophorinae is a major problem of Gelechioidea taxonomy and systematics, and some authors separate the former two as full-blown families (Amphisbatidae and Depressariidae), and/or include the Amphisbatinae in Depressariinae (or Depressariidae), or merge them in the Oecophorinae outright.

== Species ==
The species of Hypercallia are:

- Hypercallia alexandra (Meyrick, 1909)
- Hypercallia argyropa Meyrick, 1914
- Hypercallia arista Walsingham, 1912
- Hypercallia bruneri Busck, [1934]
- Hypercallia catenella Zeller, 1877
- Hypercallia chaldaica (Meyrick, 1913)
- Hypercallia chionastra Meyrick, 1926
- Hypercallia chionopis Meyrick, 1916
- Hypercallia citrinalis (Scopoli, 1763)
- Hypercallia citroclista Meyrick, 1930
- Hypercallia cnephaea (Walsingham, 1912)
- Hypercallia crocatella Zeller, 1877
- Hypercallia cupreata (Dognin, 1905)
- Hypercallia cuprones van Gijen, 1912
- Hypercallia cyathopa (Meyrick, 1913)
- Hypercallia diplotrocha Meyrick, 1937
- Hypercallia gnorisma (Walsingham, 1912)
- Hypercallia haematella (Felder, 1875)
- Hypercallia halobapta Meyrick, 1930
- Hypercallia heliodepta Meyrick, 1932
- Hypercallia heliomima Meyrick, 1930
- Hypercallia heterochroma Clarke, 1971
- Hypercallia incensella Zeller, 1877
- Hypercallia inguinaris van Gijen, 1912
- Hypercallia leucothyrsa (Meyrick, 1938)
- Hypercallia longimaculata (Dognin, 1905)
- Hypercallia loxochorda Meyrick, 1926
- Hypercallia lydia (Druce, 1901)
- Hypercallia miltopa (Meyrick, 1912)
- Hypercallia miniata (Dognin, 1905)
- Hypercallia niphocycla Meyrick, 1926
- Hypercallia obliquistriga Dognin, 1905
- Hypercallia orthochaeta (Meyrick, 1913)
- Hypercallia phlebodes (Walsingham, 1912)
- Hypercallia psittacopa (Meyrick, 1912)
- Hypercallia pyrarcha Meyrick, 1910
- Hypercallia rhodosarca (Walsingham, 1912)
- Hypercallia sarcodes Diakonoff, 1954
- Hypercallia sincera Meyrick, 1909
- Hypercallia subreticulata Walsingham, 1881
- Hypercallia syntoma (Walsingham, 1912)
- Hypercallia unilorata (Meyrick, 1933)

== Former species ==
- Hypercallia calidaria Meyrick, 1921
