= Hypercallia rhodosarca =

Scientific classification
- Domain: Eukaryota
- Kingdom: Animalia
- Phylum: Arthropoda
- Class: Insecta
- Order: Lepidoptera
- Family: Oecophoridae
- Genus: Hypercallia
- Species: H. rhodosarca

Binomial name
- Hypercallia rhodosarca (Walsingham, 1912)

Synonyms
- Cryptolechia rhodosarca Walsingham, 1912

Species of moth

Hypercallia rhodosarca is a moth in the family Depressariidae. It was described by Lord Walsingham in 1912. It is found in Guatemala and Bolivia.

The wingspan is about 18 mm. The forewings are bright rosy red, much reticulated at the base and towards the apex with bright golden yellow, which forms a series of about eight subterminal spots around the apex. A bright rosy purple suffusion covering the dorsum, except its basal fourth, extends upward across the cell nearly to the costa, its inner edge being marked on the cell by a round silvery white spot, a small white dot lying at its outer edge on the end of the cell - this suffusion is not clearly defined, but blends with the ground colour towards the termen. The hindwings are rosy pink.
