= Hypercallia psittacopa =

Scientific classification
- Kingdom: Animalia
- Phylum: Arthropoda
- Class: Insecta
- Order: Lepidoptera
- Family: Oecophoridae
- Genus: Hypercallia
- Species: H. psittacopa

Binomial name
- Hypercallia psittacopa (Meyrick, 1912)

Synonyms
- Coptotelia psittacopa Meyrick, 1912

Species of moth

Hypercallia psittacopa is a moth in the family Depressariidae. It was described by Edward Meyrick in 1912. It is found in Colombia.

The wingspan is about 19 mm (0.75 in). The forewings are deep bronzy brown largely suffused with purple blackish and with a large yellow basal patch reticulated with bright crimson red, not reaching the dorsum, irregularly marked with dark fuscous towards the costa, the outer edge angulated in the middle. The first discal stigma is represented by a black dot within the angle of the basal patch, the second by an irregular roundish yellow spot containing a suffused crimson-red ring. There are yellow transverse spots marked beneath with crimson red on the costa before the middle and at two-thirds, as well as a subterminal series of pale yellowish dots. The hindwings are dark fuscous.
