= Hypercallia miniata =

Scientific classification
- Domain: Eukaryota
- Kingdom: Animalia
- Phylum: Arthropoda
- Class: Insecta
- Order: Lepidoptera
- Family: Oecophoridae
- Genus: Hypercallia
- Species: H. miniata

Binomial name
- Hypercallia miniata (Dognin, 1905)

Synonyms
- Cryptolechia miniata Dognin, 1905

Species of moth

Hypercallia miniata is a moth in the family Depressariidae. It was described by Paul Dognin in 1905. It is found in Ecuador.
