= Hypercallia incensella =

Scientific classification
- Kingdom: Animalia
- Phylum: Arthropoda
- Clade: Pancrustacea
- Class: Insecta
- Order: Lepidoptera
- Family: Oecophoridae
- Genus: Hypercallia
- Species: H. incensella

Binomial name
- Hypercallia incensella Zeller, 1877

Synonyms
- Hypercallia (Brachyplatea) incensella Zeller, 1877

Species of moth

Hypercallia incensella is a moth in the family Depressariidae. It was described by Philipp Christoph Zeller in 1877. It is found in Peru.
