= Hypercallia cnephaea =

Scientific classification
- Domain: Eukaryota
- Kingdom: Animalia
- Phylum: Arthropoda
- Class: Insecta
- Order: Lepidoptera
- Family: Oecophoridae
- Genus: Hypercallia
- Species: H. cnephaea

Binomial name
- Hypercallia cnephaea (Walsingham, 1912)

Synonyms
- Gonionota cnephaea Walsingham, 1912

Species of moth

Hypercallia cnephaea is a moth in the family Depressariidae. It was described by Lord Walsingham in 1912. It is found in Panama.

The wingspan is about 19 mm. The forewings are dark tawny, with a yellowish-white streak along the outer half of the costa, blending to yellowish ochreous at its lower edge, this colour gradually losing itself in the tawny wing surface toward the end of the cell. On the lower two-thirds of the termen some fawn grey occurs between the tawny lines which mark the veins, extending inward nearly as far as the cell. The hindwings are dark fawn grey.
