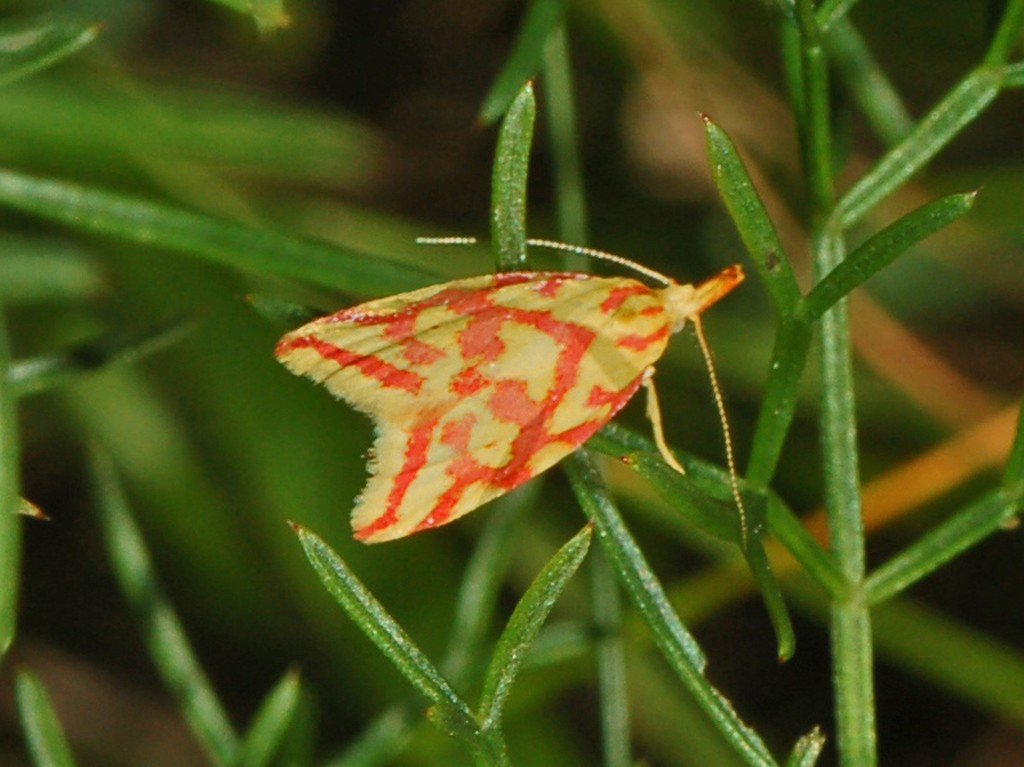

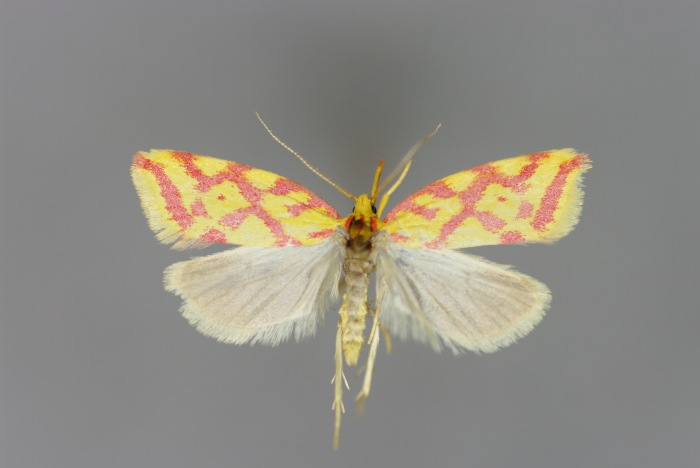

Scientific classification
- Kingdom: Animalia
- Phylum: Arthropoda
- Clade: Pancrustacea
- Class: Insecta
- Order: Lepidoptera
- Family: Oecophoridae
- Genus: Hypercallia
- Species: H. citrinalis

Binomial name
- Hypercallia citrinalis (Scopoli, 1763)

Synonyms
- Phalaena citrinalis Scopoli, 1763; Phalaena christiernana Linnaeus, 1767; Hypercallia christiernella (Hübner, [1824]); Carcina christierella (Hübner, [1825]); Hypercallia christiernini (Zeller, 1850)

= Hypercallia citrinalis =

Species of moth

Hypercallia citrinalis is a moth of the family Depressariidae. It is found in Europe, Asia Minor, Georgia, Armenia, Azerbaijan, Mongolia and southern Siberia (Altai, Minusinsk, Irkutsk).

The wingspan is about 19 mm. The forewings are bright yellow; a streak along the basal third of the costa with two oblique projections, a slender fascia from the middle of the costa to 1/3 of the dorsum, connected by two downward-oblique bars with an irregular interrupted subterminal fascia, second discal stigma, and a narrow terminal fascia bright crimson. Hindwings are grey. The larva is greenish-grey; dorsal line whitish; dots black, whitish-ringed; head and 2 black-speckled.

The moth flies from June to July depending on the location.

The larvae feed on Polygala vulgaris and Polygala calcarea.
