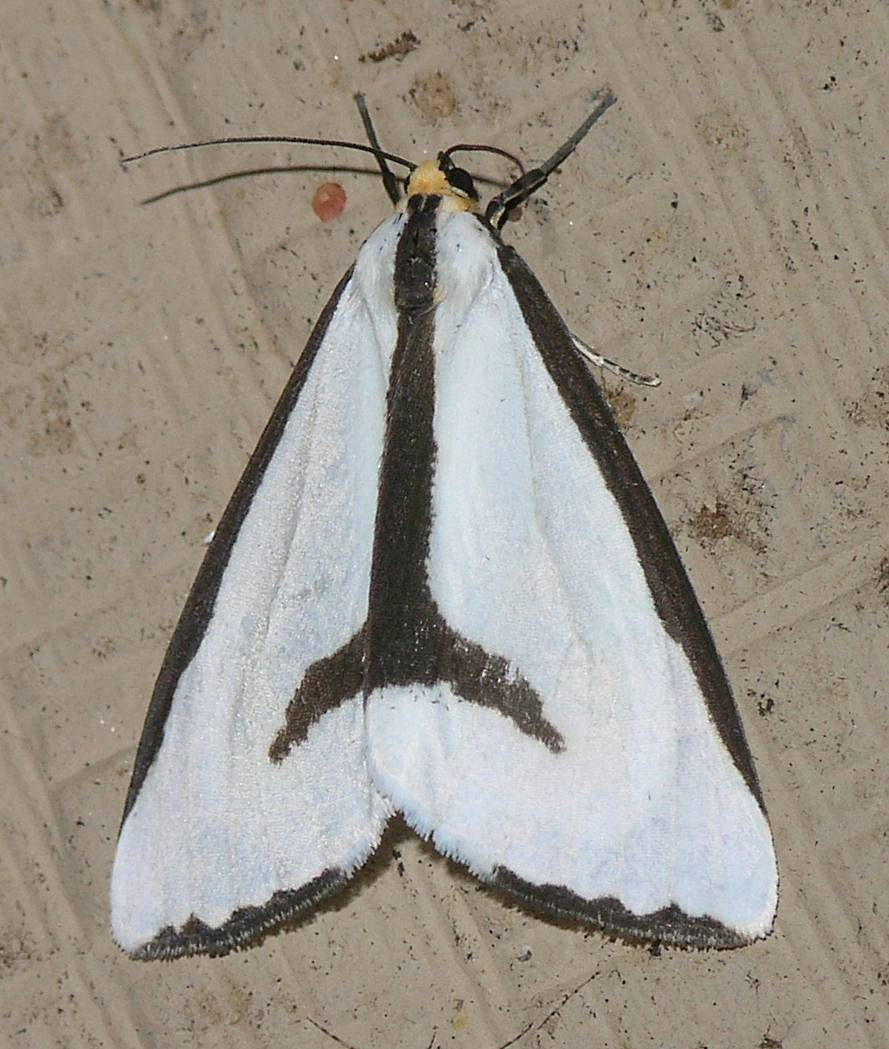

Scientific classification
- Kingdom: Animalia
- Phylum: Arthropoda
- Clade: Pancrustacea
- Class: Insecta
- Order: Lepidoptera
- Superfamily: Noctuoidea
- Family: Erebidae
- Subfamily: Arctiinae
- Genus: Haploa
- Species: H. lecontei

Binomial name
- Haploa lecontei (Guérin-Méneville, 1832)

Synonyms
- Callimorpha lecontei Guérin-Méneville, 1832; Haploa lecontii Lintner, 1874 (missp.); Haploa leucomelas Herrich-Schäffer, 1855; Haploa suffusca Franclemont, 1938

= Haploa lecontei =

Leconte's haploa

Species of moth

Haploa lecontei, or Leconte's haploa, is a moth of the family Erebidae. The species was first described by Félix Édouard Guérin-Méneville in 1832. It is found in North America from Nova Scotia to Georgia, west to Manitoba through Arkansas.

The wingspan is 36–50 mm.

The larvae feed on various plants, including apple, blackberry, peach, spearmint and trembling aspen.

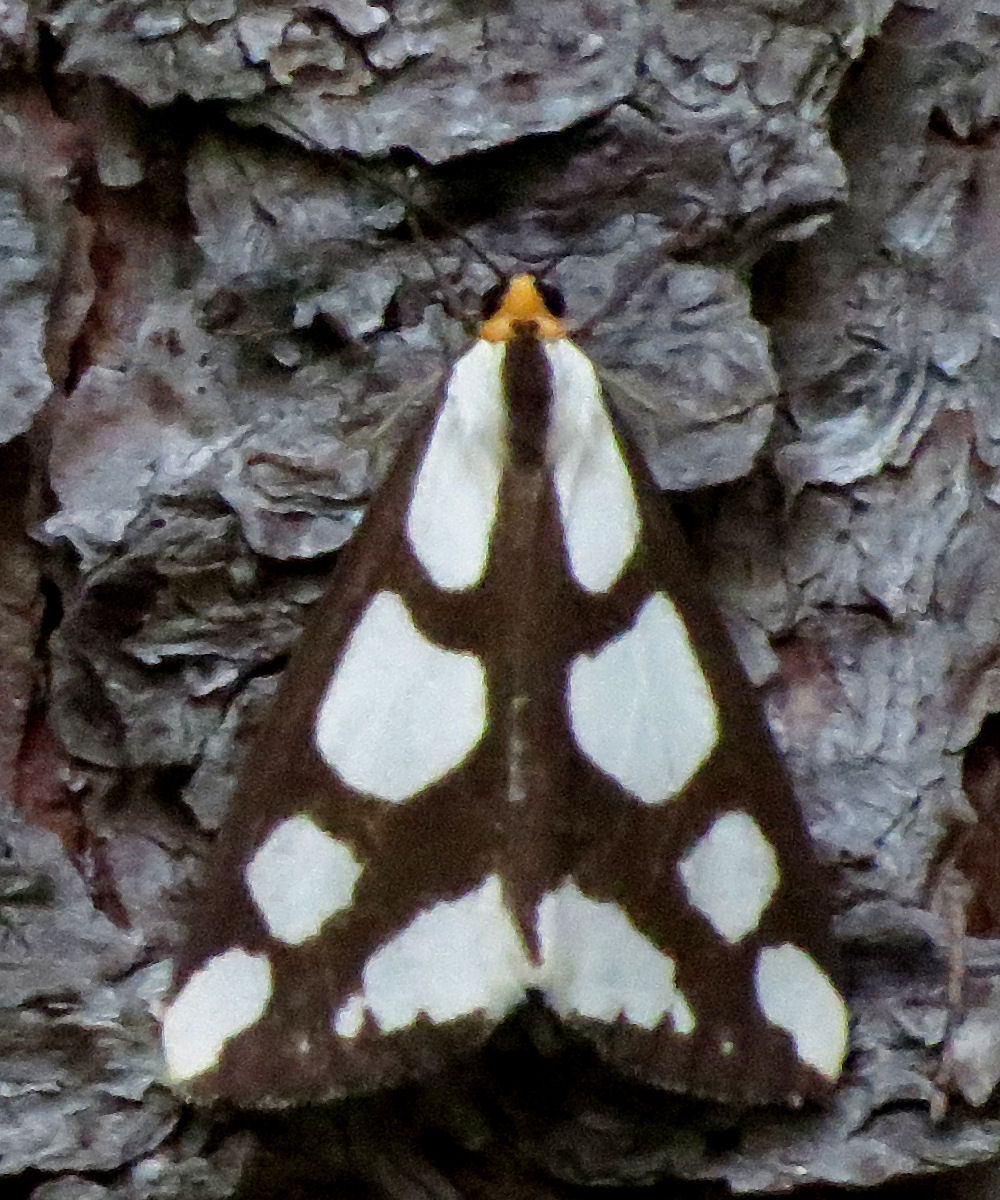
From Ladysmyth, Quebec, Canada
