= Hypercallia diplotrocha =

Scientific classification
- Kingdom: Animalia
- Phylum: Arthropoda
- Class: Insecta
- Order: Lepidoptera
- Family: Oecophoridae
- Genus: Hypercallia
- Species: H. diplotrocha

Binomial name
- Hypercallia diplotrocha Meyrick, 1937

Species of moth

Hypercallia diplotrocha is a moth in the family Depressariidae. It was described by Edward Meyrick in 1937. It is found in Argentina.
