= Hypercallia halobapta =

Scientific classification
- Kingdom: Animalia
- Phylum: Arthropoda
- Class: Insecta
- Order: Lepidoptera
- Family: Oecophoridae
- Genus: Hypercallia
- Species: H. halobapta

Binomial name
- Hypercallia halobapta Meyrick, 1930

Species of moth

Hypercallia halobapta is a moth in the family Depressariidae. It was described by Edward Meyrick in 1930. It is found in Brazil.

The wingspan is about 20 mm.
