= Hypercallia miltopa =

Scientific classification
- Kingdom: Animalia
- Phylum: Arthropoda
- Class: Insecta
- Order: Lepidoptera
- Family: Oecophoridae
- Genus: Hypercallia
- Species: H. miltopa

Binomial name
- Hypercallia miltopa (Meyrick, 1912)

Synonyms
- Coptotelia miltopa Meyrick, 1912; Cryptolechia tunicata Busck, 1914

Species of moth

Hypercallia miltopa is a moth in the family Depressariidae. It was described by Edward Meyrick in 1912. It is found in Panama and Colombia.

The wingspan is about 23 mm. The forewings are dark purplish fuscous suffusedly mixed with blackish and with a bright yellow stripe of uneven width running all around the costa and termen to near the tornus, widest near the base and at the apex, attenuated towards the extremity, the lower edge suffused with fulvous brown. There is a bright red oval spot in the disc before the middle, edged beneath by an elongate sometimes interrupted snow-white mark, its anterior extremity enlarged and surrounded by scattered crimson scales. The second discal stigma is curved, transverse and indicated by obscure crimson edging. The hindwings are dark grey with the cell whitish grey, tinged posteriorly with rosy.
