= Hypercallia heliodepta =

Scientific classification
- Kingdom: Animalia
- Phylum: Arthropoda
- Class: Insecta
- Order: Lepidoptera
- Family: Oecophoridae
- Genus: Hypercallia
- Species: H. heliodepta

Binomial name
- Hypercallia heliodepta Meyrick, 1932

Species of moth

Hypercallia heliodepta is a moth in the family Depressariidae. It was described by Edward Meyrick in 1932. It is found in Mexico.
