= Hypercallia chaldaica =

Scientific classification
- Kingdom: Animalia
- Phylum: Arthropoda
- Class: Insecta
- Order: Lepidoptera
- Family: Oecophoridae
- Genus: Hypercallia
- Species: H. chaldaica

Binomial name
- Hypercallia chaldaica (Meyrick, 1913)

Synonyms
- Coptotelia chaldaica Meyrick, 1913

Species of moth

Hypercallia chaldaica is a moth in the family Depressariidae. It was described by Edward Meyrick in 1913. It is found in Argentina.

The wingspan is about 19 mm. The forewings are pale ochreous yellowish, suffusedly reticulated with crimson and with a brown streak along the basal two-fifths of the costa, as well as an irregular brown streak from beyond the middle of the costa to before the middle of the dorsum preceded and followed in the disc by round semitransparent silvery-white spots, the second followed by a smaller similar spot. There is a lilac-brown terminal fascia, enclosing a pale yellowish pre-apical spot and on the lower half broadly dilated and marked anteriorly with a suffused spot of blackish irroration. The hindwings are whitish, the apical fourth very pale rosy ochreous.
