= Hypercallia subreticulata =

Scientific classification
- Domain: Eukaryota
- Kingdom: Animalia
- Phylum: Arthropoda
- Class: Insecta
- Order: Lepidoptera
- Family: Oecophoridae
- Genus: Hypercallia
- Species: H. subreticulata

Binomial name
- Hypercallia subreticulata Walsingham, 1881

Species of moth

Hypercallia subreticulata is a moth in the family Depressariidae. It was described by Lord Walsingham in 1881. It is found in South Africa.

The wingspan is about 14 mm. The forewings are bright yellow, subreticulated with rosy vermilion streaks and shades, of which the most important are sprinkled with steel-blue metallic scales, notably a narrow oblique fascia from beyond the middle of the costa to the anal angle, a diverging streak leaving this fascia below the costa and running to the basal third of the dorsal margin, two rather triangular costal spots, the one before, the other beyond, the middle, the extreme base of the costa, and a streak along the apical margin. Between these markings are some few bright rosy vermilion shades. The hindwings are brownish fuscous.
