= Hypercallia heterochroma =

Scientific classification
- Domain: Eukaryota
- Kingdom: Animalia
- Phylum: Arthropoda
- Class: Insecta
- Order: Lepidoptera
- Family: Oecophoridae
- Genus: Hypercallia
- Species: H. heterochroma

Binomial name
- Hypercallia heterochroma J. F. G. Clarke, 1971

Species of moth

Hypercallia heterochroma is a moth in the family Depressariidae. It was described by John Frederick Gates Clarke in 1971. It is found in Venezuela.

The wingspan is 19–21 mm. The forewings are brown sparsely irrorated (speckled) with pale yellow and the base of the costa and two triangular spots, one at the basal third, the second at two thirds of costa, yellow. The apex from the coastal four-fifths to vein 4, yellow. Around the apex to vein 5, is a slender, broken, brown line. The costa is brown mixed with scarlet, where the ground color intrudes between the yellow costal markings. These markings are edged scarlet from the yellow costal mark at the basal third and a zigzag scarlet mark extends to the middle of the wing. On the dorsum, an inwardly curved scarlet mark extends from the basal fifth to near the middle and beyond the end of the cell is a large oval scarlet blotch, with a conspicuous, transverse, narrow series of black scales, extending to the tornus. At the basal third, in the cell, is a conspicuous fuscous-edged white spot and at the end of the cell is a very small, ill-defined whitish spot. The hindwings are yellowish white, basally shading to grayish then pink toward the termen. The costa and apex are gray.
