= Coptotelia =

Scientific classification
- Kingdom: Animalia
- Phylum: Arthropoda
- Clade: Pancrustacea
- Class: Insecta
- Order: Lepidoptera
- Family: Depressariidae
- Genus: Coptotelia; Zeller, 1863

Synonyms
- Hyphypena Warren, 1889

Genus of moths

Coptotelia is a moth genus of the family Depressariidae.

== Species ==
- Coptotelia allardi Clarke, 1951
- Coptotelia bipunctalis (Warren, 1889)
- Coptotelia calidaria (Meyrick, 1921)
- Coptotelia colpodes (Walsingham, 1912)
- Coptotelia complicata Clarke, 1951
- Coptotelia cyathopoides Clarke, 1951
- Coptotelia elena Clarke, 1951
- Coptotelia fenestrella Zeller, 1863
- Coptotelia gioia Clarke, 1951
- Coptotelia margaritacea (Meyrick, 1924)
- Coptotelia nigriplaga Dognin, 1904
- Coptotelia pecten Clarke, 1951
- Coptotelia perseaphaga Clarke, 1951
- Coptotelia terminalis Clarke, 1951
