= Hypercallia sincera =

Scientific classification
- Kingdom: Animalia
- Phylum: Arthropoda
- Class: Insecta
- Order: Lepidoptera
- Family: Oecophoridae
- Genus: Hypercallia
- Species: H. sincera

Binomial name
- Hypercallia sincera Meyrick, 1909

Species of moth

Hypercallia sincera is a moth in the family Depressariidae. It was described by Edward Meyrick in 1909. It is found in South Africa.

The wingspan is about 24 mm. The forewings and hindwings are ochreous white.
