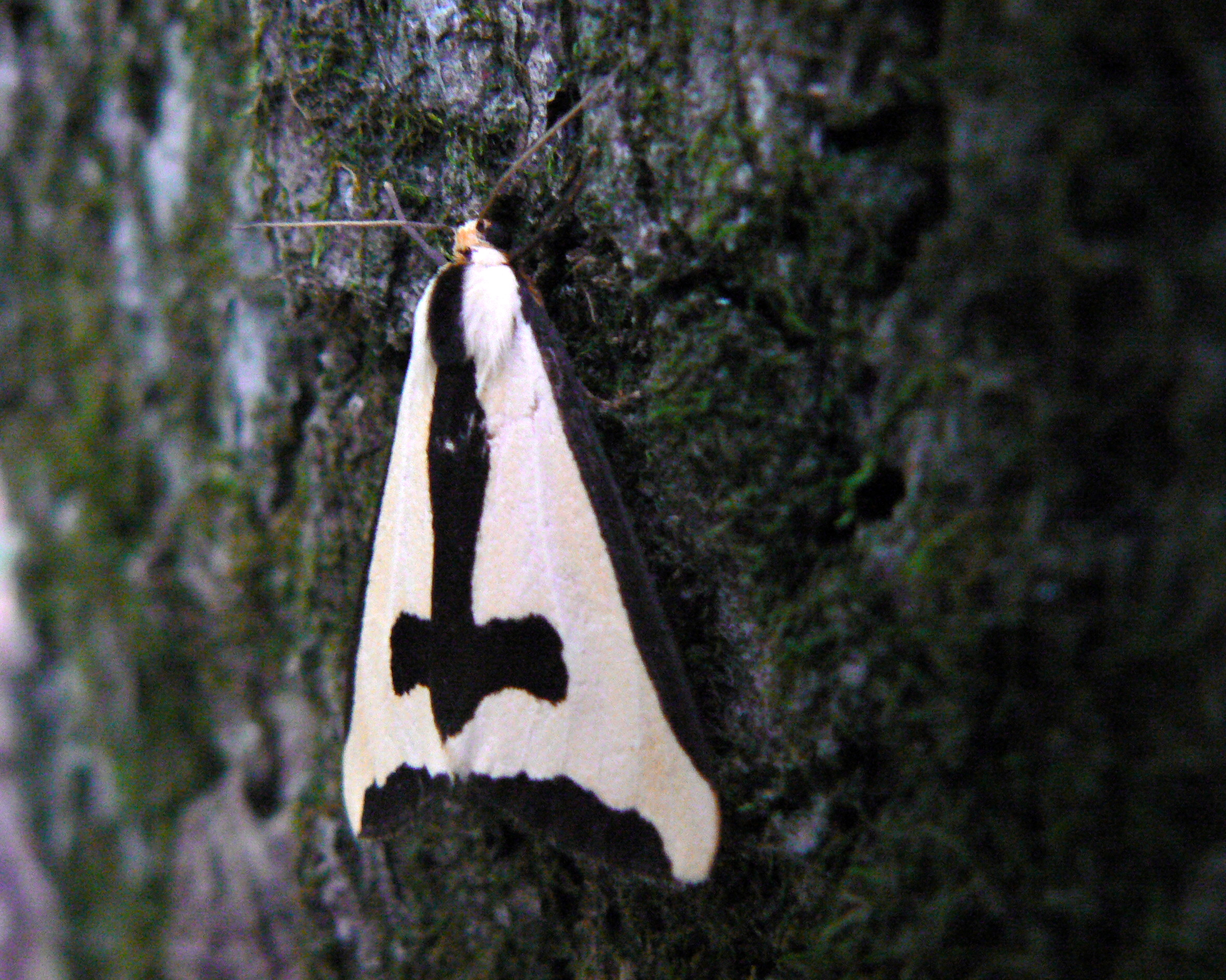
- Haploa clymene

Scientific classification
- Kingdom: Animalia
- Phylum: Arthropoda
- Clade: Pancrustacea
- Class: Insecta
- Order: Lepidoptera
- Superfamily: Noctuoidea
- Family: Erebidae
- Subfamily: Arctiinae
- Subtribe: Callimorphina
- Genus: Haploa; Hübner, [1820]

= Haploa =

Genus of moths

Haploa is a genus of tiger moths in the family Erebidae. The genus was erected by Jacob Hübner in 1820.

Larvae of these species are generally polyphagous, developing on host plants such as Populus, Salix, Prunus, and Rubus.

== Species ==
- Haploa clymene (Brown, 1776) – Clymene moth
- Haploa colona (Hübner, [1804] 1800-1803) – colona moth
- Haploa confusa (Lyman, 1887) – confused haploa moth
- Haploa contigua (Walker, 1855) – neighbor moth
- Haploa lecontei (Guérin-Méneville, 1832) – Leconte's haploa moth
- Haploa reversa (Stretch, 1885) – reversed haploa moth

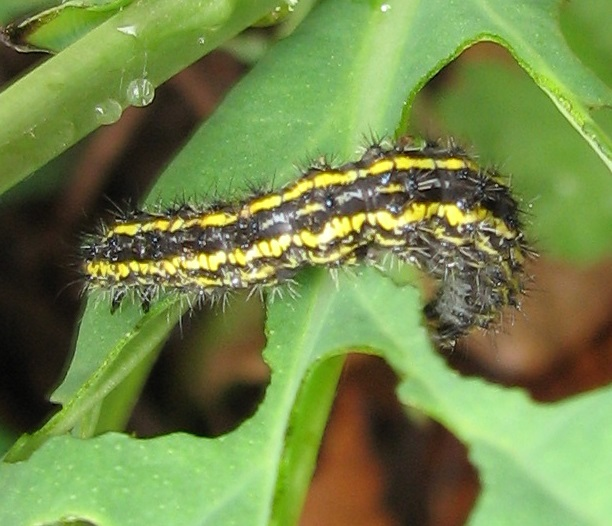
Haploa species caterpillar on bluebells
