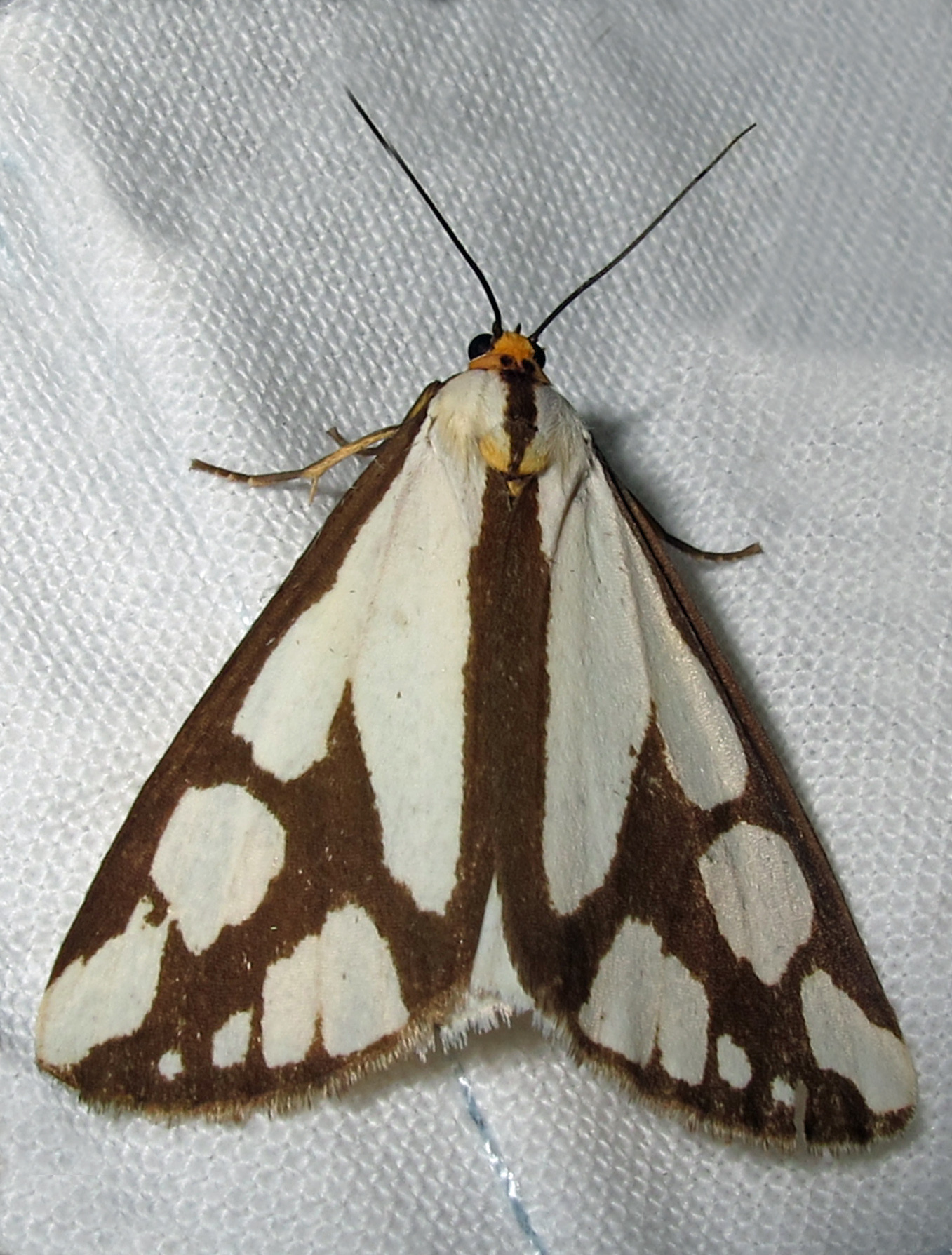

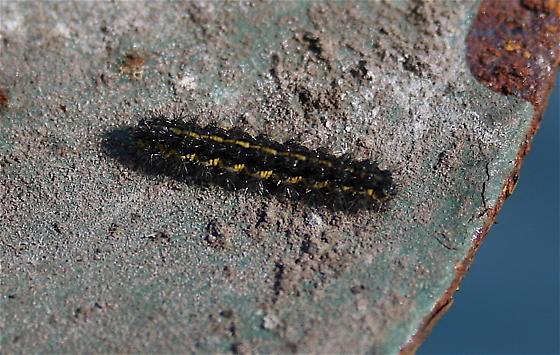
- Adult (top) and larva (bottom)

Scientific classification
- Kingdom: Animalia
- Phylum: Arthropoda
- Clade: Pancrustacea
- Class: Insecta
- Order: Lepidoptera
- Superfamily: Noctuoidea
- Family: Erebidae
- Subfamily: Arctiinae
- Genus: Haploa
- Species: H. confusa

Binomial name
- Haploa confusa (Lyman, 1887)

Synonyms
- Callimorpha confusa Lyman 1887

= Haploa confusa =

Confused haploa

Species of moth

Haploa confusa, the confused haploa or Lyman's haploa, is a moth of the family Erebidae that occurs in North America. The species was first described by H. H. Lyman in 1887. The caterpillars have been observed feeding on hound's tongue (Cynoglossum officinale), dogwoods (Cornus spp.), sugar maple (Acer saccharum), Joe Pye weed (Eutrochium purpureum), purple loosestrife (Lythrum salicaria), Morrow's honeysuckle (Lonicera morrowii), and coyote willow (Salix exigua).

== Description ==
Adult

Adults have cream-colored forewings with brown markings and almost completely white hindwings.

Caterpillar

The caterpillar is black with straight yellow dorsal stripes, sub-dorsal stripes and a broad lateral stripe.
