= Hypercallia crocatella =

Scientific classification
- Kingdom: Animalia
- Phylum: Arthropoda
- Clade: Pancrustacea
- Class: Insecta
- Order: Lepidoptera
- Family: Oecophoridae
- Genus: Hypercallia
- Species: H. crocatella

Binomial name
- Hypercallia crocatella Zeller, 1877

Species of moth

Hypercallia crocatella is a moth in the family Depressariidae. It was described by Philipp Christoph Zeller in 1877. It is found in Colombia.
