= Hypercallia orthochaeta =

Scientific classification
- Kingdom: Animalia
- Phylum: Arthropoda
- Class: Insecta
- Order: Lepidoptera
- Family: Oecophoridae
- Genus: Hypercallia
- Species: H. orthochaeta

Binomial name
- Hypercallia orthochaeta (Meyrick, 1913)

Synonyms
- Coptotelia orthochaeta Meyrick, 1913

Species of moth

Hypercallia orthochaeta is a moth in the family Depressariidae. It was described by Edward Meyrick in 1913. It is found in Peru.

The wingspan is about 23 mm. The forewings are dark brown, somewhat mixed with blackish-grey irroration tending to form suffused strigulae, the costal edge blackish and the dorsum marked with crimson suffusion towards the base. There are obscure dots of crimson suffusion in the disc at one-fifth, and on the fold beyond this. The stigmata are represented by suffused crimson spots, the plical beyond the first discal, the second discal largest. There are also small white wedge-shaped costal spots at two-fifths and three-fourths, and three white costal dots posteriorly. The hindwings are pale whitish ochreous, the posterior half suffused with pale brownish.
