= Hypercallia heliomima =

Scientific classification
- Kingdom: Animalia
- Phylum: Arthropoda
- Class: Insecta
- Order: Lepidoptera
- Family: Oecophoridae
- Genus: Hypercallia
- Species: H. heliomima

Binomial name
- Hypercallia heliomima Meyrick, 1930

Species of moth

Hypercallia heliomima is a moth in the family Depressariidae. It was described by Edward Meyrick in 1930. It is found in Colombia.

The wingspan is about 24 mm.
