= Coptotelia colpodes =

Scientific classification
- Domain: Eukaryota
- Kingdom: Animalia
- Phylum: Arthropoda
- Class: Insecta
- Order: Lepidoptera
- Family: Depressariidae
- Genus: Coptotelia
- Species: C. colpodes

Binomial name
- Coptotelia colpodes (Walsingham, 1912)

Synonyms
- Hyphypena colpodes Walsingham, 1912

Species of moth

Coptotelia colpodes is a moth in the family Depressariidae. It was described by Walsingham in 1912. It is found in Panama.

The wingspan is about 19 mm. The forewings are dark fawn-brown, with rich reddish patches mixed with pale yellow, and two transparent spots on the cell almost white. The red suffusion commences at the base of the dorsum, extending widely along it and narrowly upward to the costa, where it ends in a white marginal spot preceded by a yellowish spot below it, the first transparent spot on the cell lying also within its area at its outer edge. This reddish suffusion is scarcely and very indistinctly separated by fawn-brown from a larger red suffusion, occupying the whole central third of the dorsum and extending upward to the costa, where it ends in a white marginal spot at- three-fourths from the base. This suffused portion, extending beyond the edge of the cell, contains at its inner edge, on the extremity of the cell, the second whitish transparent spot, it is also broken by three or four ill-defined yellow patches and by a large dark fuscous patch below and beyond the lower angle of the cell. The hindwings are semi-transparent, bone-whitish on their basal half, shaded with fawn-brown beyond, an elongate fuscous spot showing through from the underside at the outer end of the cell.
