= Hypercallia cuprones =

Scientific classification
- Domain: Eukaryota
- Kingdom: Animalia
- Phylum: Arthropoda
- Class: Insecta
- Order: Lepidoptera
- Family: Oecophoridae
- Genus: Hypercallia
- Species: H. cuprones

Binomial name
- Hypercallia cuprones van Gijen, 1912

Species of moth

Hypercallia cuprones is a moth in the family Depressariidae. It was described by van Gijen in 1912. It is found on Java.
