= Hypercallia citroclista =

Scientific classification
- Kingdom: Animalia
- Phylum: Arthropoda
- Class: Insecta
- Order: Lepidoptera
- Family: Oecophoridae
- Genus: Hypercallia
- Species: H. citroclista

Binomial name
- Hypercallia citroclista Meyrick, 1930

Species of moth

Hypercallia citroclista is a moth in the family Depressariidae. It was described by Edward Meyrick in 1930. It is found in Brazil.

The wingspan is about 24 mm.
