= Hypercallia lydia =

Scientific classification
- Kingdom: Animalia
- Phylum: Arthropoda
- Clade: Pancrustacea
- Class: Insecta
- Order: Lepidoptera
- Family: Oecophoridae
- Genus: Hypercallia
- Species: H. lydia

Binomial name
- Hypercallia lydia (Druce, 1901)

Synonyms
- Atteria lydia Druce, 1901

Species of moth

Hypercallia lydia is a moth in the family Depressariidae. It was described by Druce in 1901. It is found in Ecuador.

The wingspan is about 25 mm. The forewings are very dark blue, crossed from the costal to the inner margin before the end of the cell by three waved orange-yellow bands. There is a round orange-yellow spot at the end of the cell, beyond which is a curved orange submarginal line. The apex and outer margin are streaked with orange yellow and the fringe is dark brownish yellow. The hindwings are brown, the costal margin yellow and with a black spot at the end of the cell.
