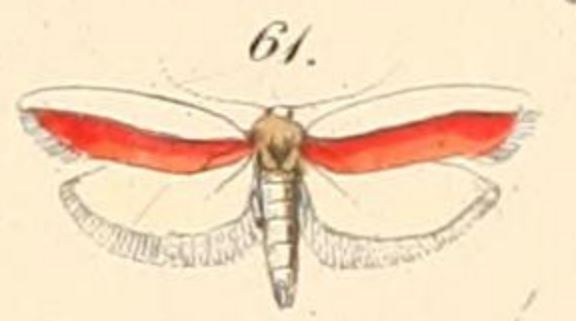

Scientific classification
- Domain: Eukaryota
- Kingdom: Animalia
- Phylum: Arthropoda
- Class: Insecta
- Order: Lepidoptera
- Family: Oecophoridae
- Genus: Hypercallia
- Species: H. haematella

Binomial name
- Hypercallia haematella (Felder, 1875)

Synonyms
- Apiletria haematella Felder, 1875

= Hypercallia haematella =

Species of moth

Hypercallia haematella is a moth of the family Depressariidae. It is found in Mauritius and South Africa.
