= Hypercallia bruneri =

Scientific classification
- Kingdom: Animalia
- Phylum: Arthropoda
- Class: Insecta
- Order: Lepidoptera
- Family: Oecophoridae
- Genus: Hypercallia
- Species: H. bruneri

Binomial name
- Hypercallia bruneri Busck, 1934

Synonyms
- Agriocoma bruneri (Busck, 1934)

Species of moth

Hypercallia bruneri is a moth in the family Depressariidae. It was described by August Busck in 1934. It is found in Cuba.
