= Peter Brown (naturalist) =

English naturalist

- Occupations: naturalist and illustrator
- Notable work: New illustrations of Zoology
- Title: Botanical Painter
- Scientific career
- Fields: natural history

Peter Brown (active 1758–1799) was an English naturalist and natural history illustrator of Danish ancestry who worked mainly in London.

== Life and work ==
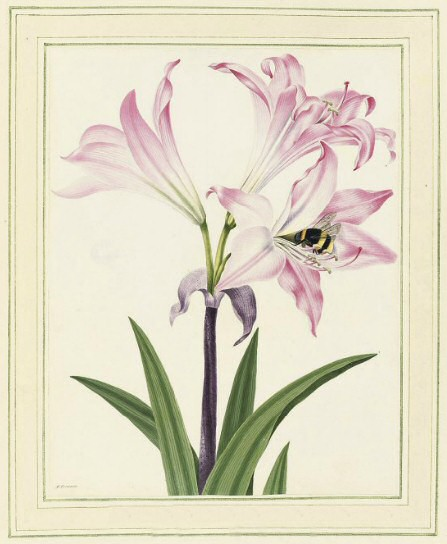
Flower illustration, ca 1782

Brown was an associate of the great English naturalists Thomas Pennant and Joseph Banks. Though primarily an illustrator, he wrote the scientific descriptions of some species, such as the brightly marked North American Arctiid moth Haploa clymene. Brown's illustrations included birds, botanical subjects and insects.

== Published works ==
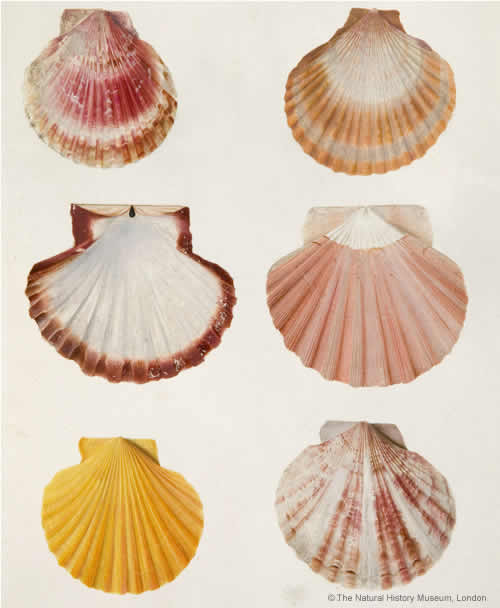
Watercolour on vellum of six scallop shells in varying colours by Peter Brown c. 1766.

Brown illustrated Emanuel Mendes da Costa's book, Elements of Conchology, or An Introduction to the Knowledge of Shells (1771).

In 1776, Brown published his own work, New illustrations of Zoology, "containing fifty coloured plates of new, curious, and non-descript birds, with a few quadrupeds, reptiles and insects. Together with a short and scientific description of the same", published in London by White, and in French as "Nouvelles illustrations de zoologie, contenant cinquante planches enluminées d'oiseaux curieux, et qui non etés jamais descrits, et quelques de quadrupedes, de reptiles et d'insectes, avec de courtes descriptions systematiques".

Brown contributed to Pennant's Arctic Zoology (1784–1785).

== Exhibitions and distinctions ==
Brown exhibited at the Free Society of Artists and the Royal Academy from 1770 until 1791. He was appointed to be Botanical Painter to the Prince of Wales in 1783. He contributed botanical illustrations to private albums of Elizabeth Montagu, wife of George Montagu, 4th Duke of Manchester, implying that he was her drawing master and tutor. According to Christie's, his drawings "reveal an extremely high level of accomplishment".

== See also ==
- Papilio dardanus
