= Hypercallia chionastra =

Scientific classification
- Kingdom: Animalia
- Phylum: Arthropoda
- Class: Insecta
- Order: Lepidoptera
- Family: Oecophoridae
- Genus: Hypercallia
- Species: H. chionastra

Binomial name
- Hypercallia chionastra Meyrick, 1926

Species of moth

Hypercallia chionastra is a moth in the family Depressariidae. It was described by Edward Meyrick in 1926. It is found in Colombia.

The wingspan is about 21 mm. The forewings are brown sprinkled dark fuscous, the base and basal half of the costa moderately broadly suffused rather dark fuscous, the dorsum and termen slenderly suffused dark fuscous, the discal area beyond the cell suffused brassy yellowish, the veins in this area forming dark brown lines. There is a transverse dark fuscous line from the dorsum at one-fourth to the costal suffusion and a slightly oblique dark fuscous shade from the costa before the middle to the lower margin of the cell, as well as a crescentic white spot on the costal postmedian depression. A very small snow-white transverse spot is found on the end of the cell and there is a dark brown subterminal line enclosing with dark terminal suffusion and veins a series of brassy-yellow spots. The hindwings are pale grey.
