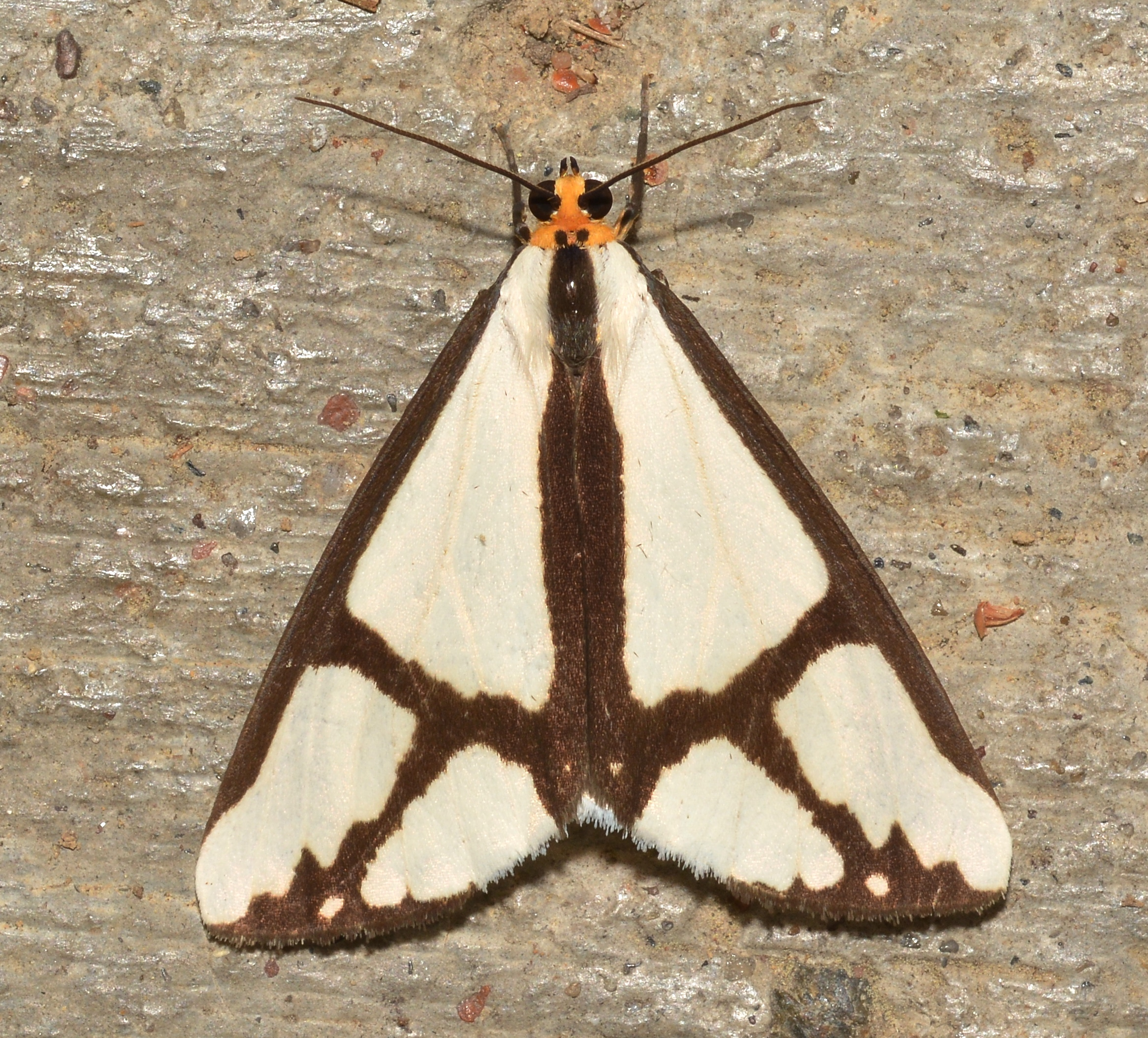

Scientific classification
- Kingdom: Animalia
- Phylum: Arthropoda
- Class: Insecta
- Order: Lepidoptera
- Superfamily: Noctuoidea
- Family: Erebidae
- Subfamily: Arctiinae
- Genus: Haploa
- Species: H. contigua

Binomial name
- Haploa contigua (Walker, 1855)

Synonyms
- Hypercompa contigua Walker, 1855; Haploa contigua var. lumbonigera Dyar, 1902; Haploa lumbonigera Dyar, [1903]

= Haploa contigua =

Species of moth

Haploa contigua, the neighbor moth, is a moth of the family Erebidae. It was described by Francis Walker in 1855. It is found in eastern North America, from Quebec to the mountains of Georgia and west to South Dakota, Arkansas and Mississippi.
