= Hypercallia sarcodes =

Scientific classification
- Kingdom: Animalia
- Phylum: Arthropoda
- Clade: Pancrustacea
- Class: Insecta
- Order: Lepidoptera
- Family: Oecophoridae
- Genus: Hypercallia
- Species: H. sarcodes

Binomial name
- Hypercallia sarcodes Diakonoff, 1954

Species of moth

Hypercallia sarcodes is a moth in the family Depressariidae. It was described by Alexey Diakonoff in 1954. It is found in New Guinea.
