= Hypercallia cyathopa =

Scientific classification
- Kingdom: Animalia
- Phylum: Arthropoda
- Class: Insecta
- Order: Lepidoptera
- Family: Oecophoridae
- Genus: Hypercallia
- Species: H. cyathopa

Binomial name
- Hypercallia cyathopa (Meyrick, 1913)

Synonyms
- Coptotelia cyathopa Meyrick, 1913

Species of moth

Hypercallia cyathopa is a moth in the family Depressariidae. It was described by Edward Meyrick in 1913. It is found in Colombia.

The wingspan is about 22 mm. The forewings are yellow, streaked with crimson-red on the veins and with a rather dark purplish-fuscous streak edged with crimson from the base of the dorsum along the costa to one-third, then bent abruptly down to the middle of the disc and again angulated upwards to the costa beyond the middle, the discal angle truncate, preceded and followed by round semitransparent white spots edged with crimson, and sending a slender streak to the dorsum at one-third, dilated on the dorsum. There is a rather dark fuscous transverse mark in the disc at one-fourth and a slender curved crimson streak mixed with fuscous running from the extremity of the costal streak to a spot of dark fuscous suffusion above the dorsum towards the tornus. The costal edge is shortly white beyond this and there is a moderate lilac-brown fascia rurming around the apical portion of the costa and termen to the tornus, its costal portion including three small spots of crimson and yellow. The hindwings are whitish, on the posterior half tinged with yellowish, and towards the upper half of the termen with pale rosy.
