= Coptotelia fenestrella =

Scientific classification
- Kingdom: Animalia
- Phylum: Arthropoda
- Clade: Pancrustacea
- Class: Insecta
- Order: Lepidoptera
- Family: Depressariidae
- Genus: Coptotelia
- Species: C. fenestrella

Binomial name
- Coptotelia fenestrella Zeller, 1863

Species of moth

Coptotelia fenestrella is a moth in the family Depressariidae. It was described by Philipp Christoph Zeller in 1863. It is found in Colombia and Venezuela.
