= Hypercallia loxochorda =

Scientific classification
- Kingdom: Animalia
- Phylum: Arthropoda
- Class: Insecta
- Order: Lepidoptera
- Family: Oecophoridae
- Genus: Hypercallia
- Species: H. loxochorda

Binomial name
- Hypercallia loxochorda Meyrick, 1926

Species of moth

Hypercallia loxochorda is a moth in the family Depressariidae. It was described by Edward Meyrick in 1926. It is found in Colombia.

The wingspan is 29–33 mm. The forewings are yellow, closely marbled crimson or orange throughout and with some irregular dark brown spotting on the costal half of the basal area. The discal stigmata are black, yellow circled, with a similar dot obliquely before and above the first and an irregular dark brown streak sprinkled blackish along the dorsum throughout, as well as a thick irregular streak rising from the middle of this and running to the apex of the wing, receiving oblique streaks from the costa at one-third and beyond the middle which are connected by a bar above the middle so as to enclose a space centred by the second discal stigma, in females more rounded and suffused whitish. There is an angulated subterminal series of small dark brown spots, on the dorsal half sometimes confluent with preceding markings. A marginal series of dark fuscous marks is found around the apical area and termen, in females obsolete. The hindwings are ochreous whitish.
