= Philip Sheppard (biologist) =

British geneticist and lepidopterist

- Born: 27 July 1921; Marlborough, Wiltshire, England
- Died: 17 October 1976 (age 55); Liverpool, Merseyside, England
- Occupation: Professor of Genetics
- Known for: Population genetics of lepidoptera, and work on Rh disease
- Spouse: Patricia Beatrice Lee (married 1948–1976)
- Children: 3 sons

Professor Philip MacDonald Sheppard, F.R.S. (27 July 1921 – 17 October 1976) was a British geneticist and lepidopterist. He made advances in ecological and population genetics in lepidopterans, pulmonate land snails and humans. In medical genetics, he worked with Cyril Clarke on Rh disease.

== Early life and education ==
He was born on 27 July 1921 in Marlborough, Wiltshire, England and attended Marlborough College from 1935 to 1939.

He saw war service from 1940 to 1945 in the Royal Air Force Volunteer Reserve, but was a prisoner of war from 1942 to 1945. During this period he participated, as an earth-bearer, in one of the famous tunnel escapes; it is unclear whether this was the "Wooden Horse" escape, or the "Great" Escape.

After the war, Sheppard returned to his studies and studied Zoology at Worcester College, Oxford, from 1946 to 1948.

== Career ==
In 1956, Sheppard became a lecturer at the University of Liverpool, being promoted to reader in 1959 and professor of genetics in 1963. He was elected a Fellow of the Royal Society on 18 May 1965 and received the society' Darwin Medal in 1974. He received the Linnean Medal (Gold Medal) for Zoology from the Linnean Society of London in 1975.

Cyril Clarke answered an advert in an insect magazine for swallowtail butterfly pupa that had been placed by Sheppard. They met and began working together in their common interest of lepidopterology. They also worked on Rh disease.

In 1961 Sheppard started a colony of scarlet tiger moths by the Wirral Way, West Kirby, Merseyside, which were rediscovered in 1988 by Cyril Clarke, who continued to observe them in his retirement to study changes in the moth population.

== Personal life ==
Sheppard married Patricia Beatrice Lee in 1948. They had three sons. He died of acute leukemia on 17 October 1976.
