= Hypercallia leucothyrsa =

Scientific classification
- Kingdom: Animalia
- Phylum: Arthropoda
- Class: Insecta
- Order: Lepidoptera
- Family: Oecophoridae
- Genus: Hypercallia
- Species: H. leucothyrsa

Binomial name
- Hypercallia leucothyrsa (Meyrick, 1938)

Synonyms
- Agriocoma leucothyrsa Meyrick, 1938

Species of moth

Hypercallia leucothyrsa is a moth in the family Depressariidae. It was described by Edward Meyrick in 1938. It is found in China (Yunnan).
