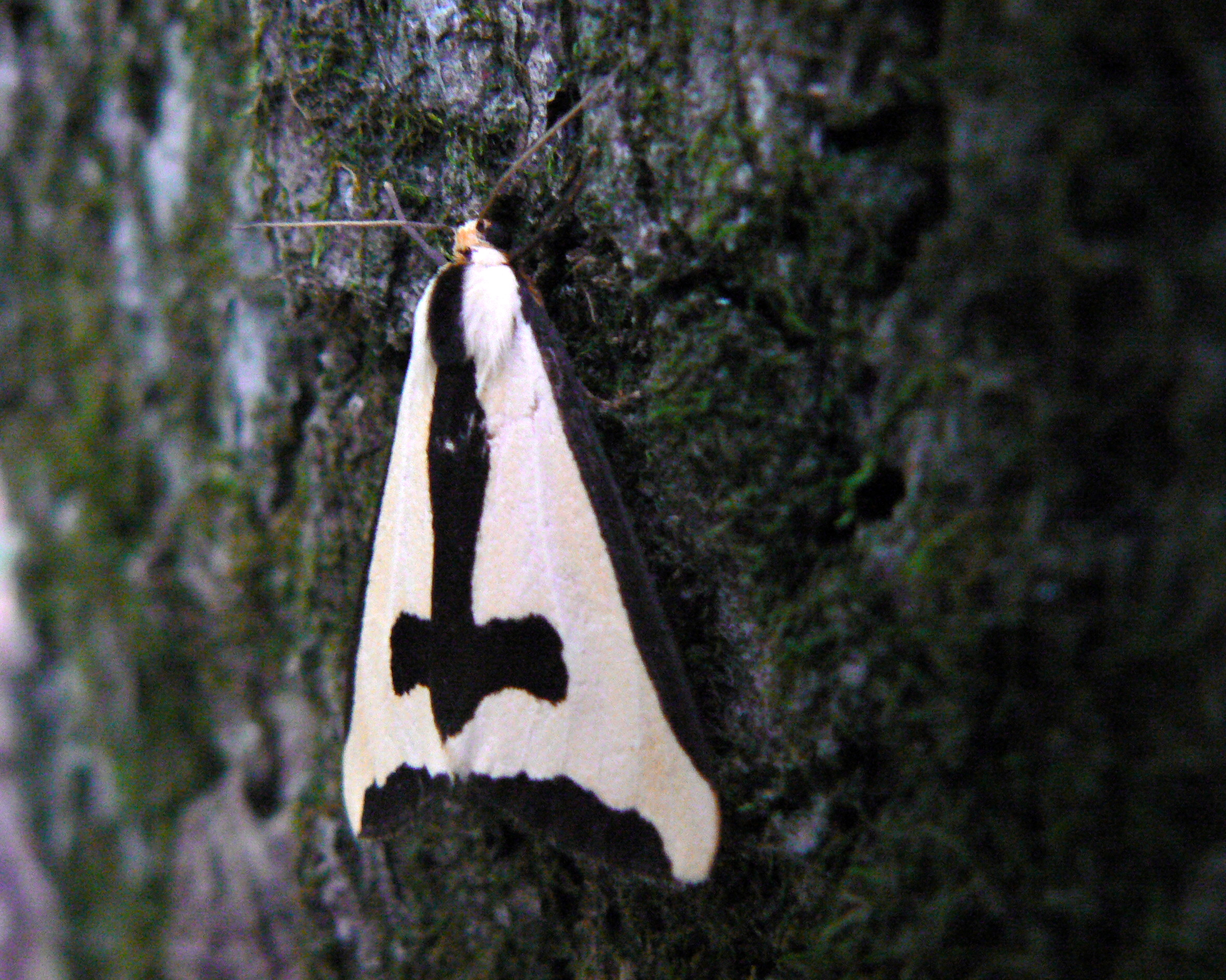

Scientific classification
- Domain: Eukaryota
- Kingdom: Animalia
- Phylum: Arthropoda
- Class: Insecta
- Order: Lepidoptera
- Superfamily: Noctuoidea
- Family: Erebidae
- Subfamily: Arctiinae
- Genus: Haploa
- Species: H. clymene

Binomial name
- Haploa clymene (P. Brown, 1776)

Synonyms
- Phalaena clymene Brown, 1776; Bombyx interruptomarginata Palisot de Beauvois, 1824; Hypercompa comma Walker, 1855

= Haploa clymene =

Clymene moth

Species of moth

Haploa clymene, the Clymene moth, is a moth of the tiger moth subfamily - Arctiinae, tribe Arctiini. The species was first described to Western science by Peter Brown in 1776. It is found in eastern North America.

== Description ==
The forewing is creamy yellow with a partial brown-black border that extends inward from the inner margin near anal angle. The hindwing is yellow orange with one or two brown-black spots. The wingspan is 40–55 mm.

== Life cycle ==
The spiny larva is brownish black with a yellow middorsal stripe. The larvae overwinter and mature in the spring and early summer. The larvae feed on Eupatorium, oak, peach and willow. The Clymene moth has one brood per year.
