= Coptotelia bipunctalis =

Scientific classification
- Domain: Eukaryota
- Kingdom: Animalia
- Phylum: Arthropoda
- Class: Insecta
- Order: Lepidoptera
- Family: Depressariidae
- Genus: Coptotelia
- Species: C. bipunctalis

Binomial name
- Coptotelia bipunctalis (Warren, 1889)

Synonyms
- Hyphypena bipunctalis Warren, 1889; Hypercallia byrsocyma Meyrick, 1921

Species of moth

Coptotelia bipunctalis is a moth in the family Depressariidae. It was described by Warren in 1889. It is found in Brazil.

The wingspan is 15–16 mm. The forewings are ochreous-yellow, coarsely and suffusedly reticulated brown and the costa suffused brown. The costal edge is dark fuscous, interrupted at the middle and three-fourths by yellowish spots with the costal edge white. The discal stigmata are blackish, the first minute, surrounded with yellowish, the second larger. The dorsal area is tinged rosy towards the base and the termen is suffused brown. The hindwings are pale yellowish, towards the apex and upper part of the termen tinged light brownish.
