= Coptotelia margaritacea =

Scientific classification
- Kingdom: Animalia
- Phylum: Arthropoda
- Class: Insecta
- Order: Lepidoptera
- Family: Depressariidae
- Genus: Coptotelia
- Species: C. margaritacea

Binomial name
- Coptotelia margaritacea (Meyrick, 1924)

Synonyms
- Hypercallia margaritacea Meyrick, 1924

Species of moth

Coptotelia margaritacea is a moth in the family Depressariidae. It was described by Edward Meyrick in 1924. It is found in Bolivia.

The wingspan is about 18 mm. The forewings are whitish yellowish, with silver-white reflections and the markings fuscous partially tinged with reddish ferruginous on the veins. There is a fascia occupying the basal fourth, extended on the costa to one-third, where it sends an oblique bar to the middle of the next fascia, a line on the upper edge of the cell connecting these. A rather narrow fascia is found from the middle of the costa to the middle of the dorsum, expanded on the costal edge, broader towards the dorsum but almost interrupted by a spot of ground colour below the middle, on the dorsum confluent with preceding and following fasciae. There is a moderate terminal fascia, broader towards the ends but apically including a spot of ground colour, a curved stria from the second fascia near the costa to the terminal below the middle, another running round the end of the cell, and indications of lines on some veins tending to break the postmedian area up into spots. The hindwings are white, with a narrow streak of grey suffusion along the upper half of the termen.
