= Hypercallia phlebodes =

Scientific classification
- Domain: Eukaryota
- Kingdom: Animalia
- Phylum: Arthropoda
- Class: Insecta
- Order: Lepidoptera
- Family: Oecophoridae
- Genus: Hypercallia
- Species: H. phlebodes

Binomial name
- Hypercallia phlebodes (Walsingham, 1912)

Synonyms
- Gonionota phlebodes Walsingham, 1912

Species of moth

Hypercallia phlebodes is a moth in the family Depressariidae. It was described by Lord Walsingham in 1912. It is found in Guatemala.

The wingspan is about 19 mm. The forewings are yellow, with fawn-brown blotches and bright reddish ferruginous streaks. An elongate fawn-brown blotch occupies the base of the costa above the cell, extending to one-third, with some reddish ferruginous scales intermixed. A second fawn-brown blotch occupies the middle of the costa, descending to the lower edge of the cell, where, at its inner angle, is a black spot, a second black spot lying at the end of the cell a little beyond its outer angle. A dorsal blotch of the same colour, at one-third from the base, is attenuated upwards to the fold, near the first black spot. A third fawn-brown shade occurs along the outer third of the costa, produced through the terminal cilia and connected with a narrow fawn-brown terminal band which shades the pale yellow cilia with brown toward the tornus. An irregular curved line of scattered blackish scales runs parallel to the margin of the wing, from the fold to vein 10, halfway between the cell and the margin. The whole of the bright yellow intermediate space between the somewhat ill-defined brown blotches is mottled with rich reddish ferruginous, each vein being distinctly marked by a line of that colour. The hindwings are greyish white.
