= Hypercallia gnorisma =

Scientific classification
- Domain: Eukaryota
- Kingdom: Animalia
- Phylum: Arthropoda
- Class: Insecta
- Order: Lepidoptera
- Family: Oecophoridae
- Genus: Hypercallia
- Species: H. gnorisma

Binomial name
- Hypercallia gnorisma (Walsingham, 1912)

Synonyms
- Coptotelia gnorisma Walsingham, 1912

Species of moth

Hypercallia gnorisma is a moth in the family Depressariidae. It was described by Lord Walsingham in 1912. It is found in Mexico, Guatemala and Panama.

The wingspan is 20–21 mm. The forewings are yellowish, much suffused with fawn ochreous and reddish orange. A minute black dot on the cell, at one-third of the wing length, in a spot of the yellow ground colour, is followed by an oblique black spot at the end of the cell, an oblique dark fuscous dorsal shade, arising at one-fourth from the base, crosses the fold, and passes between the two black spots, blending with the fawn shading towards the costa, where a narrow dark fuscous shade occupies the middle of the margin between two equally narrow, elongate, white marginal spots, a third minute white spot occurring before the apex. The termen is somewhat shaded with fawn brownish, extending to one-half the length of the cilia, which along the middle of the termen are pale yellowish on their outer half. The hindwings are rich rosy grey, paler towards the base.
