= Hypercallia pyrarcha =

Scientific classification
- Kingdom: Animalia
- Phylum: Arthropoda
- Class: Insecta
- Order: Lepidoptera
- Family: Oecophoridae
- Genus: Hypercallia
- Species: H. pyrarcha

Binomial name
- Hypercallia pyrarcha Meyrick, 1910

Species of moth

Hypercallia pyrarcha is a moth in the family Depressariidae. It was described by Edward Meyrick in 1910. It is found in India (Assam).

The wingspan is 17–18 mm. The forewings are yellow, reticulated with orange red and with the basal third of the costa orange red with three oblique dark fuscous streaks. There are two fasciae of dark purplish-grey suffusion, the first median, dilated towards the dorsum so as to reach one-fourth and coalesce posteriorly with the second, the second is broad, terminal, and united with the first by a bar beneath the costa so as to enclose in the disc an orange-red roundish patch containing a yellow spot marked with a dark fuscous dot. The hindwings are grey, lighter anteriorly.
