= Hypercallia chionopis =

Scientific classification
- Kingdom: Animalia
- Phylum: Arthropoda
- Class: Insecta
- Order: Lepidoptera
- Family: Oecophoridae
- Genus: Hypercallia
- Species: H. chionopis

Binomial name
- Hypercallia chionopis Meyrick, 1916

Species of moth

Hypercallia chionopis is a moth in the family Depressariidae. It was described by Edward Meyrick in 1916. It is found in French Guiana.

The wingspan is 13–14 mm. The forewings are pale yellow, coarsely and irregularly reticulated with crimson and the costa with about six short oblique streaks of dark fuscous suffusion. The discal stigmata are small, round and white, surrounded with crimson and there is a slender fascia of dark fuscous suffusion from the middle of the costa behind the first discal stigma to the dorsum before the middle, where it is expanded. There is a curved streak of dark fuscous suffusion edged with crimson running near the posterior part of the costa and termen. The hindwings are rather dark grey, with a faint crimson tinge.
