= Hypercallia alexandra =

Scientific classification
- Kingdom: Animalia
- Phylum: Arthropoda
- Class: Insecta
- Order: Lepidoptera
- Family: Oecophoridae
- Genus: Hypercallia
- Species: H. alexandra

Binomial name
- Hypercallia alexandra (Meyrick, 1909)

Synonyms
- Gonionota alexandra Meyrick, 1909

Species of moth

Hypercallia alexandra is a moth in the family Depressariidae. It was described by Edward Meyrick in 1909. It is found in Peru.

The wingspan is 18–20 mm. The forewings are brown, more or less largely suffused with light rosy carmine and with a suffused dark reddish-fuscous streak from the base above the middle to the middle of the costa, marked with a more or less distinct short pale ochreous-yellowish line from the base and an ochreous-yellow oblique dash at two-fifths, the costal extremity whitish edged anteriorly. Beneath this dash are two round white dots longitudinally placed in the disc, the second somewhat lower and larger. The costal sinuation beyond the dark streak is marked with a wedge-shaped white spot, separated from it beneath by a suffused yellow spot, beyond this are two approximated inwardly oblique dark reddish-fuscous marks on the costa. There is a dark reddish-fuscous streak along the basal two-thirds of the dorsum, thickest in the middle, attenuated posteriorly. There is also an oblique dark fuscous mark crossing the subdorsal area at one-fourth and suffused dark reddish-fuscous streaks along the posterior half of the submedian fold, the posterior portion of the lower margin of the cell, and veins 2 and 3. An undefined triangular blotch covers veins 4-7, suffused with rather dark brown. The hindwings are fuscous irrorated with dark fuscous.
