= Coptotelia elena =

Scientific classification
- Domain: Eukaryota
- Kingdom: Animalia
- Phylum: Arthropoda
- Class: Insecta
- Order: Lepidoptera
- Family: Depressariidae
- Genus: Coptotelia
- Species: C. elena

Binomial name
- Coptotelia elena Clarke, 1951

Species of moth

Coptotelia elena is a moth in the family Depressariidae. It was described by Clarke in 1951. It is found in Brazil (Amazonas).
