= Hypercallia arista =

Scientific classification
- Domain: Eukaryota
- Kingdom: Animalia
- Phylum: Arthropoda
- Class: Insecta
- Order: Lepidoptera
- Family: Oecophoridae
- Genus: Hypercallia
- Species: H. arista

Binomial name
- Hypercallia arista Walsingham, 1912

Species of moth

Hypercallia arista is a moth in the family Depressariidae. It was described by Lord Walsingham in 1912. It is found in Mexico (Veracruz).

The wingspan is about 16 mm. The forewings are pale yellow, much mottled with bright reddish ferruginous, and clouded with chestnut brown. This is most conspicuous in a broad fasciaform shade, commencing a little before the middle of the costa, extending outward to the costal cilia, narrowed downward to the cell, and thence bifurcate to the dorsum. The inner fork, more conspicuous than the outer, forming a brown dorsal patch at one-fourth from the base, the outer fork diffused toward the termen which is also shaded throughout with chestnut brown. The hindwings are dark tawny brown, tending to brownish fuscous toward their apex; cilia brownish grey, with a paler, patch below the apex.
