= Coptotelia nigriplaga =

Scientific classification
- Domain: Eukaryota
- Kingdom: Animalia
- Phylum: Arthropoda
- Class: Insecta
- Order: Lepidoptera
- Family: Depressariidae
- Genus: Coptotelia
- Species: C. nigriplaga

Binomial name
- Coptotelia nigriplaga Dognin, 1904

Synonyms
- Coptotelia prominula Meyrick, 1913

Species of moth

Coptotelia nigriplaga is a moth in the family Depressariidae. It was described by Paul Dognin in 1904. It is found in Colombia and Ecuador.

The wingspan is 19–20 mm. The forewings are crimson, suffusedly spotted with yellow between the veins and with a rather dark lilac-fuscous band along the costa from the base to three-fifths, then abruptly bent down to the middle of the disc, and again angulated to the costa beyond the middle, its median section including a subcostal spot of ground colour, and an oval semitransparent white crimson-edged spot in the disc. The costal edge is shortly white before the middle and at three-fourths and the dorsal area more or less spotted indistinctly with fuscous, sometimes with a streak from the disc to the dorsum at one-third. There is an oval semitransparent white spot in the disc beyond the dark band, followed by three round similar spots placed transversely, the median one smallest, and a narrow oblique similar spot beneath the discal extremity of the band. There is a broad rather dark lilac-fuscous terminal fascia extending to the costa, connected above by two cloudy oblique streaks with the costal band, below the middle with a broad projection occupied by a blotch of blackish suffusion. There are three pale yellow dots on the costa within this fascia. The hindwings are whitish, faintly tinged with yellowish and towards the dorsum with rosy and there is a broad light brown terminal fascia not reaching the tornus.
