= Hypercallia obliquistriga =

Scientific classification
- Domain: Eukaryota
- Kingdom: Animalia
- Phylum: Arthropoda
- Class: Insecta
- Order: Lepidoptera
- Family: Oecophoridae
- Genus: Hypercallia
- Species: H. obliquistriga

Binomial name
- Hypercallia obliquistriga Dognin, 1905

Species of moth

Hypercallia obliquistriga is a moth in the family Depressariidae. It was described by Paul Dognin in 1905. It is found in Ecuador.
