= Hypercallia syntoma =

Scientific classification
- Domain: Eukaryota
- Kingdom: Animalia
- Phylum: Arthropoda
- Class: Insecta
- Order: Lepidoptera
- Family: Oecophoridae
- Genus: Hypercallia
- Species: H. syntoma

Binomial name
- Hypercallia syntoma (Walsingham, 1912)

Synonyms
- Hyphypena syntoma Walsingham, 1912

Species of moth

Hypercallia syntoma is a moth in the family Depressariidae. It was described by Lord Walsingham in 1912. It is found in Panama.

The wingspan is about 13 mm. The forewings are canary yellow, mottled with vermilion, especially about the base, along the cell, and on the lines of the veins beyond the end of the cell. The costa and termen are narrowly tawny brownish, an indistinct outwardly curved subterminal fascia of the same colour, from the outer third of the costa, not quite reaching the tornus. There is a small tawny-brownish spot at the end of the cell, and another on the dorsum near the flexus containing some raised scales. The hindwings are shining, semitransparent, pale golden yellowish.
