= Hypercallia niphocycla =

Scientific classification
- Kingdom: Animalia
- Phylum: Arthropoda
- Class: Insecta
- Order: Lepidoptera
- Family: Oecophoridae
- Genus: Hypercallia
- Species: H. niphocycla

Binomial name
- Hypercallia niphocycla Meyrick, 1926

Species of moth

Hypercallia niphocycla is a moth in the family Depressariidae. It was described by Edward Meyrick in 1926. It is found in Colombia.

The wingspan is about 23 mm. The forewings are yellow reticulated orange red, the basal area also reticulated dark brown and there are dark brown spots on the costa at one-fifth and two-fifths, and the dorsum is dark brown towards the base. There is a broad dark brown median fascia parallel to the termen, followed on the lower three-fourths by another fascia confluent with it above the middle and connected beneath by bars on the veins, also connected similarly with a terminal fascia confluent with it on the tornus, the costal area on the apical third suffusedly reticulated dark brown. A round white spot edged red above is found on the edge of the median fascia, indicating the first discal stigma, and a white dot on its posterior edge representing the second. The hindwings are grey, thinly scaled towards the base.
