= Hypercallia argyropa =

Scientific classification
- Kingdom: Animalia
- Phylum: Arthropoda
- Class: Insecta
- Order: Lepidoptera
- Family: Oecophoridae
- Genus: Hypercallia
- Species: H. argyropa

Binomial name
- Hypercallia argyropa Meyrick, 1914

Species of moth

Hypercallia argyropa is a moth in the family Depressariidae. It was described by Edward Meyrick in 1914. It is found in Peru.

The wingspan is about 16 mm. The forewings are pale ochreous in males, suffusedly irrorated with crimson brownish. In females, the forewings are reddish brown largely suffused with grey. There is a small whitish-yellowish basal spot or mark not reaching the margins and an indistinct pale ochreous spot on the costa at one-fourth. In males, there are obscure markings of light grey suffusion: a subbasal fascia, a spot on the costa before the middle, a triangular patch on the costa about two-thirds, where a streak runs to the middle of the dorsum and a line to the tornus, and a narrow streak along the termen, but in females all these are merged in the general grey suffusion. The hindwings are light yellow, in females deeper posteriorly.
