= Hypercallia unilorata =

Scientific classification
- Kingdom: Animalia
- Phylum: Arthropoda
- Class: Insecta
- Order: Lepidoptera
- Family: Oecophoridae
- Genus: Hypercallia
- Species: H. unilorata

Binomial name
- Hypercallia unilorata Meyrick, 1933

Species of moth

Hypercallia unilorata is a moth in the family Depressariidae. It was described by Edward Meyrick in 1933. It is found in China.
