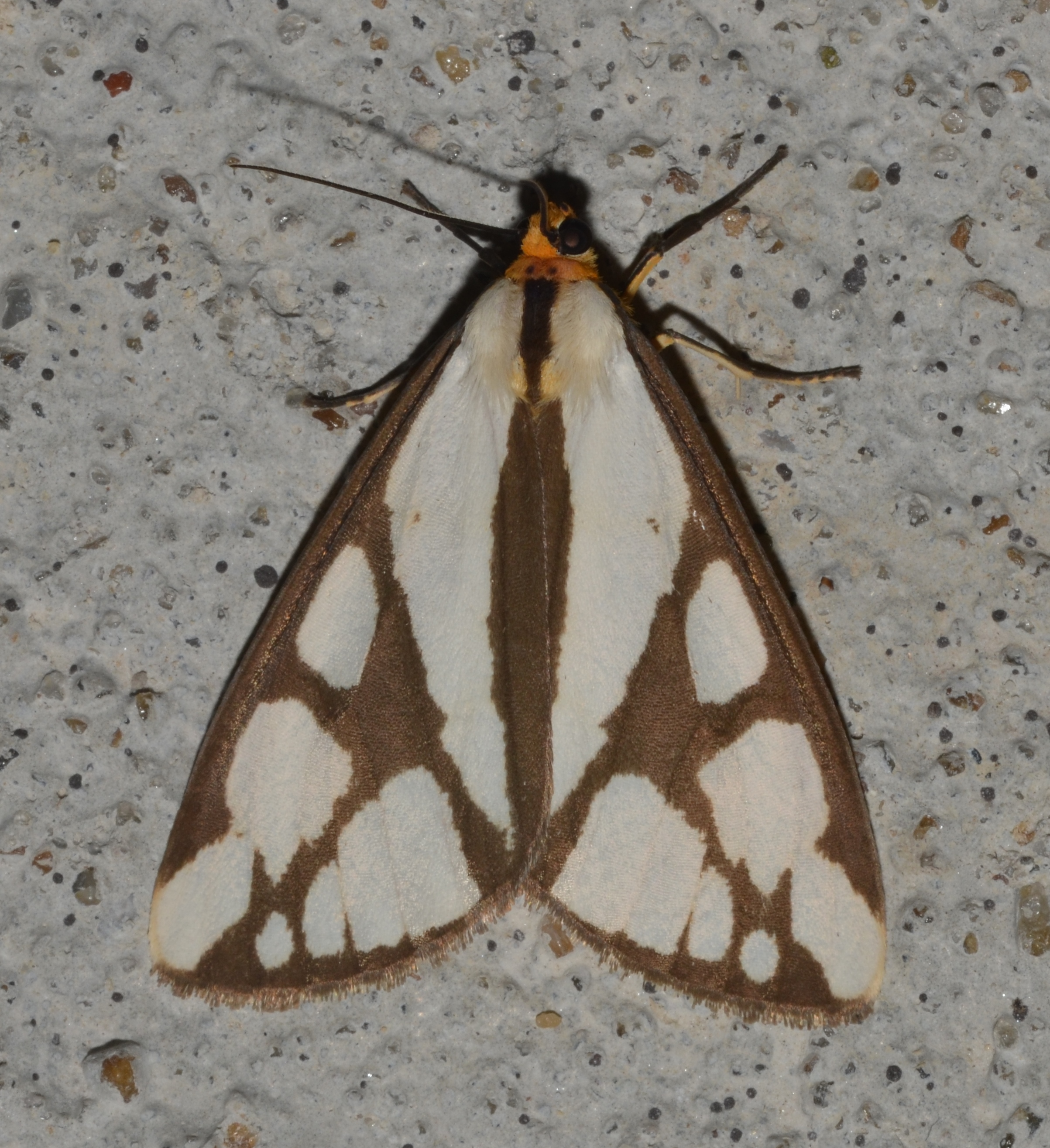

Scientific classification
- Kingdom: Animalia
- Phylum: Arthropoda
- Clade: Pancrustacea
- Class: Insecta
- Order: Lepidoptera
- Superfamily: Noctuoidea
- Family: Erebidae
- Subfamily: Arctiinae
- Genus: Haploa
- Species: H. reversa

Binomial name
- Haploa reversa (Stretch, 1885)

Synonyms
- Callimorpha reversa Stretch, 1885; Callimorpha suffusa Smith, 1887; Callimorpha suffusa Smith, 1888

= Haploa reversa =

Reversed haploa

Species of moth

Haploa reversa, the reversed haploa, is a moth of the family Erebidae. The species was first described by Stretch in 1885. It is found in North America, from south-eastern Illinois, Iowa, Kansas, New York, Oklahoma and Wisconsin and north into Southern Canada.

== Description ==
The wingspan of this species ranges between 33 mm and 48mm. The upper side of the front wings has brown bands and white patches, including a distinctive white triangular patch that extends from the thorax to more than half the length of the wing and three similar white patches along the front edges. The larvae are black with yellow to orange stripes, a reddish orange stripe along their back, and bristly spines.

== Life Cycle ==
Adults are on wing in June in one generation per year.

The larvae feed on a wide range of plants, including Malus species (apple trees).

== Conservation ==
=== Ontario ===
In Ontario, the species is listed as "Threatened", a step below endangered and something that the Government of Ontario classifies as "but is likely to become endangered if steps are not taken to address factors threatening it".

The species was added to the "Species at Risk in Ontario List" on 25 January 2023, with the assessment report published in February 2021 which identified 5 sites (about 36Km^{2}) where these moths could be found.
