= Haploa colona =

Colona moth

Scientific classification
- Kingdom: Animalia
- Phylum: Arthropoda
- Clade: Pancrustacea
- Class: Insecta
- Order: Lepidoptera
- Superfamily: Noctuoidea
- Family: Erebidae
- Subfamily: Arctiinae
- Genus: Haploa
- Species: H. colona

Binomial name
- Haploa colona (Hübner, [1802])

Synonyms
- Bombyx colona Hübner, 1804; Phalaena (Noctua) clymene Esper, 1794 (preocc.); Phalaena (Noctua) clymene Esper, 1798 (preocc.); Callimorpha carolina Harris, 1841; Hypercompa fulvicosta Clemens, 1860; Haploa duplicata Neumoegen & Dyar, 1893; Tanada conscita Walker, 1865; Callimorpha lactata Smith, 1887; Callimorpha lactata Smith, 1888; Callimorpha reversa Stretch, 1885; Callimorpha suffusa Smith, 1887; Callimorpha suffusa Smith, 1888

Species of moth

Haploa colona, the colona moth, is a moth of the family Erebidae. The species was first described by Jacob Hübner in 1802. It is found from south-eastern Virginia south to Florida and west to Texas.

The wingspan is 40–58 mm.

== Subspecies ==
- Haploa colona colona
- Haploa colona fulvicosta (Clemens, 1860) (New Jersey, Kansas, Texas)
- Haploa colona conscita (Walker, 1865)
