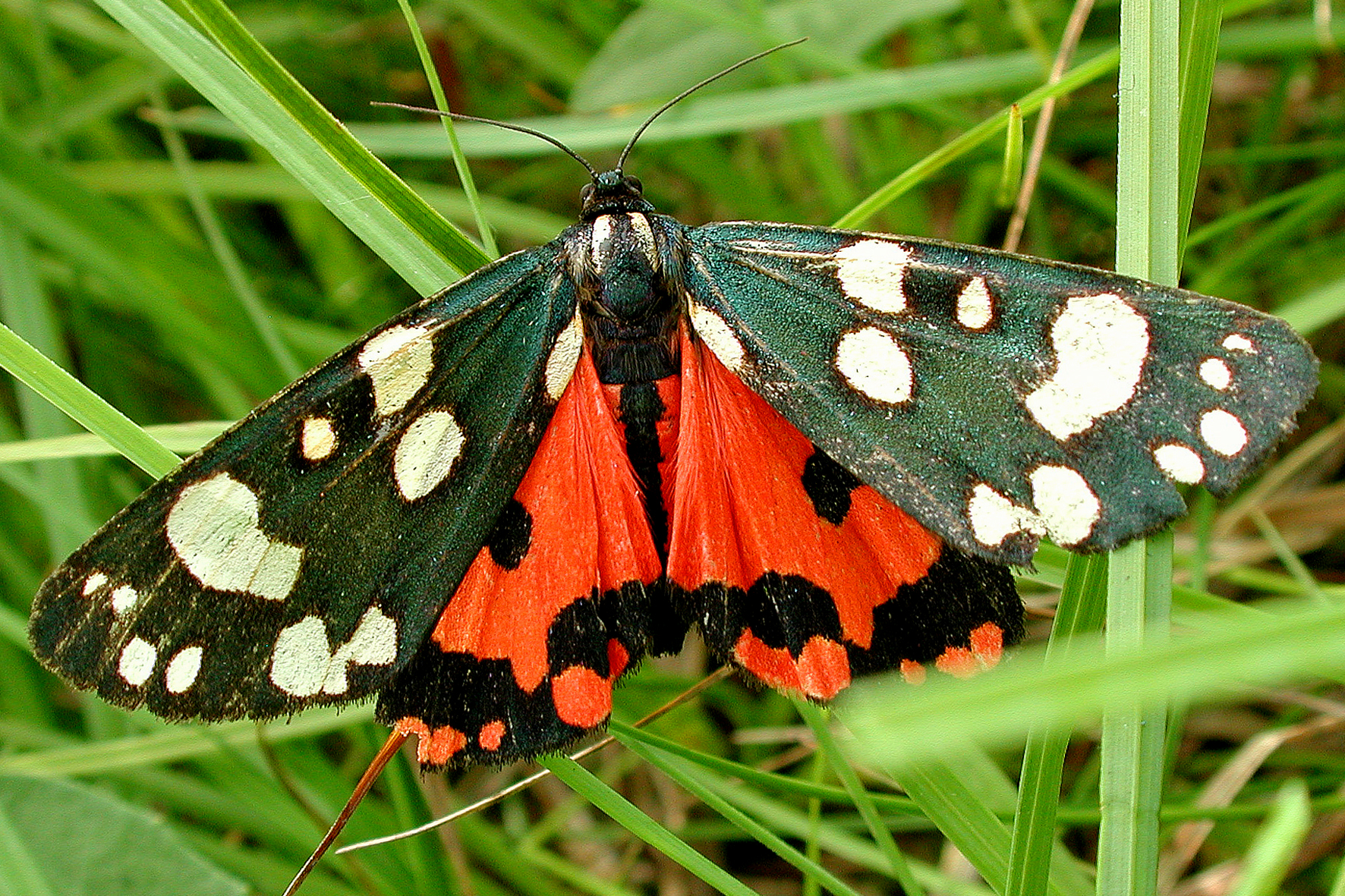
- Dorsal view
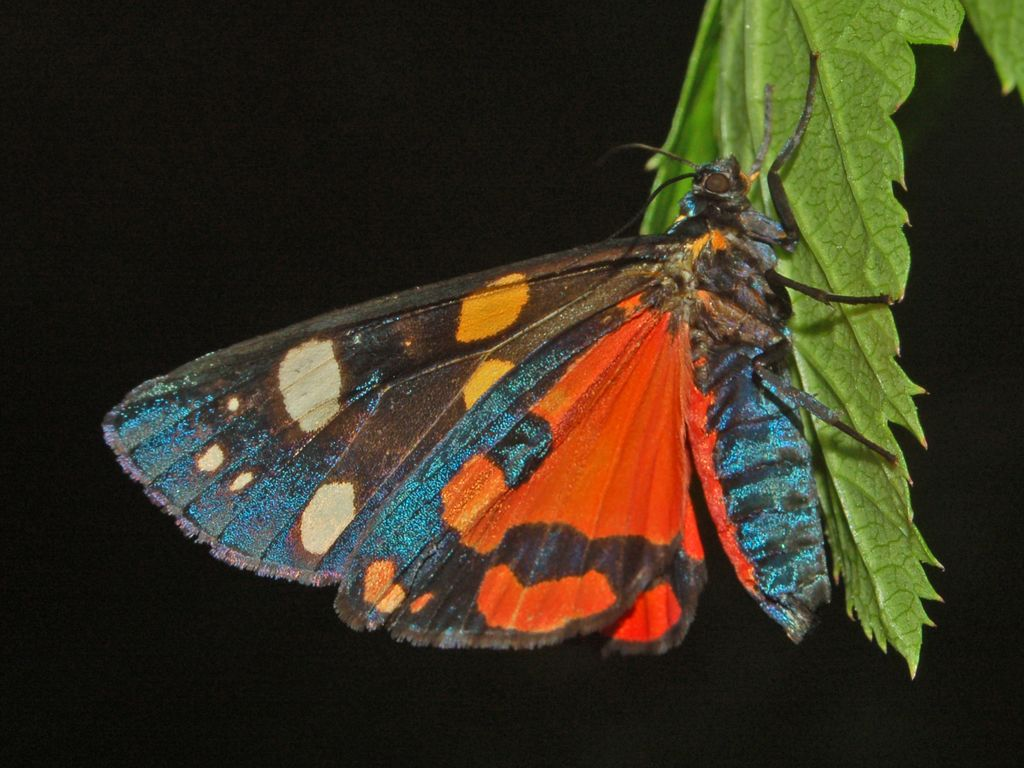
- Ventral view

Scientific classification
- Kingdom: Animalia
- Phylum: Arthropoda
- Class: Insecta
- Order: Lepidoptera
- Superfamily: Noctuoidea
- Family: Erebidae
- Subfamily: Arctiinae
- Genus: Callimorpha
- Species: C. dominula

Binomial name
- Callimorpha dominula (Linnaeus, 1758)

Synonyms
- Panaxia dominula

= Scarlet tiger moth =

Species of moth

The scarlet tiger moth (Callimorpha dominula, formerly Panaxia dominula) is a colorful moth belonging to the tiger moth subfamily, Arctiinae. The species was first described by Carl Linnaeus in his 1758 10th edition of Systema Naturae.

== Subspecies ==
Subspecies within this species include:

- Callimorpha dominula dominula (Linnaeus, 1758) (Baltic, Belarus, Ukraine, Moldova, western Russia and central Europe)
- Callimorpha dominula lusitanica Staudinger, 1894 (Portugal)
- Callimorpha dominula pompalis Nitsche, [1926] (valleys of the southern Alps)
- Callimorpha dominula persona (Hübner, 1790) (Italy south of the Alps, excluding Piedmont and southern Alpine valleys)
- Callimorpha dominula trinacriae Nardelli & Giandolfo, 1996 (Sicily)
- Callimorpha dominula profuga (Goeze, 1781) (Balkans: Macedonia (Scopje); Albania; Greece; western Turkey)
- Callimorpha dominula rossica Kolenati, 1846 (Caucasus, Transcaucasia, except Talysh Mountains; north-western Iran)
- Callimorpha dominula philippsi Bartel, 1906 (Talysh Mountains, northern Iran, southern Turkmenistan)
- Callimorpha dominula kurdistanica Thomas, 1983 (south-eastern Turkey, possibly Iraq)

== Distribution and habitat ==
This species is present in most of Europe and in the Near East (Turkey, South Caucasus and northern Iran). These moths prefer damp areas (wet meadows, river banks, fens and marshes), but they also can be found on rocky cliffs close to the sea.

== Description ==
Callimorpha dominula has a wingspan of 45–55 millimetres (1.8–2.2 in). Adults of this species are quite variable in color. The forewings usually have a metallic-green sheen on the blackish areas, with white and yellow or orange markings. Hindwings are red with three large and irregular black markings. These moths may also occur in rare color forms, one with yellow hindwings and body and one with extended black on hindwings. The thorax is black glossed with green and shows two longitudinal short yellow stripes. The abdomen is black. The scarlet tiger moth has developed mouthparts, that allow it to feed on nectar. The caterpillars can reach a length of about 40 millimetres (1.6 in). They are dark gray with yellow stripes and small white dots.

== Biology ==
The imagines are active during the day in May and June. This species has a single generation. The caterpillars are polyphagous. They mainly feed on comfrey (Symphytum officinale), but also on a number of other plants (Urtica, Cynoglossum, Fragaria, Fraxinus, Geranium, Lamium, Lonicera, Myosotis, Populus, Prunus, Ranunculus, Rubus, Salix and Ulmus species).

The three morphs occurring in the population at the Cothill reserve in Oxfordshire, Britain, have been the subject of considerable genetic study (McNamara 1998), including research by E. B. Ford, Ronald Fisher and Denis Owen. Don McNamara (1998) describes how amateurs can rear this species.

== Gallery ==
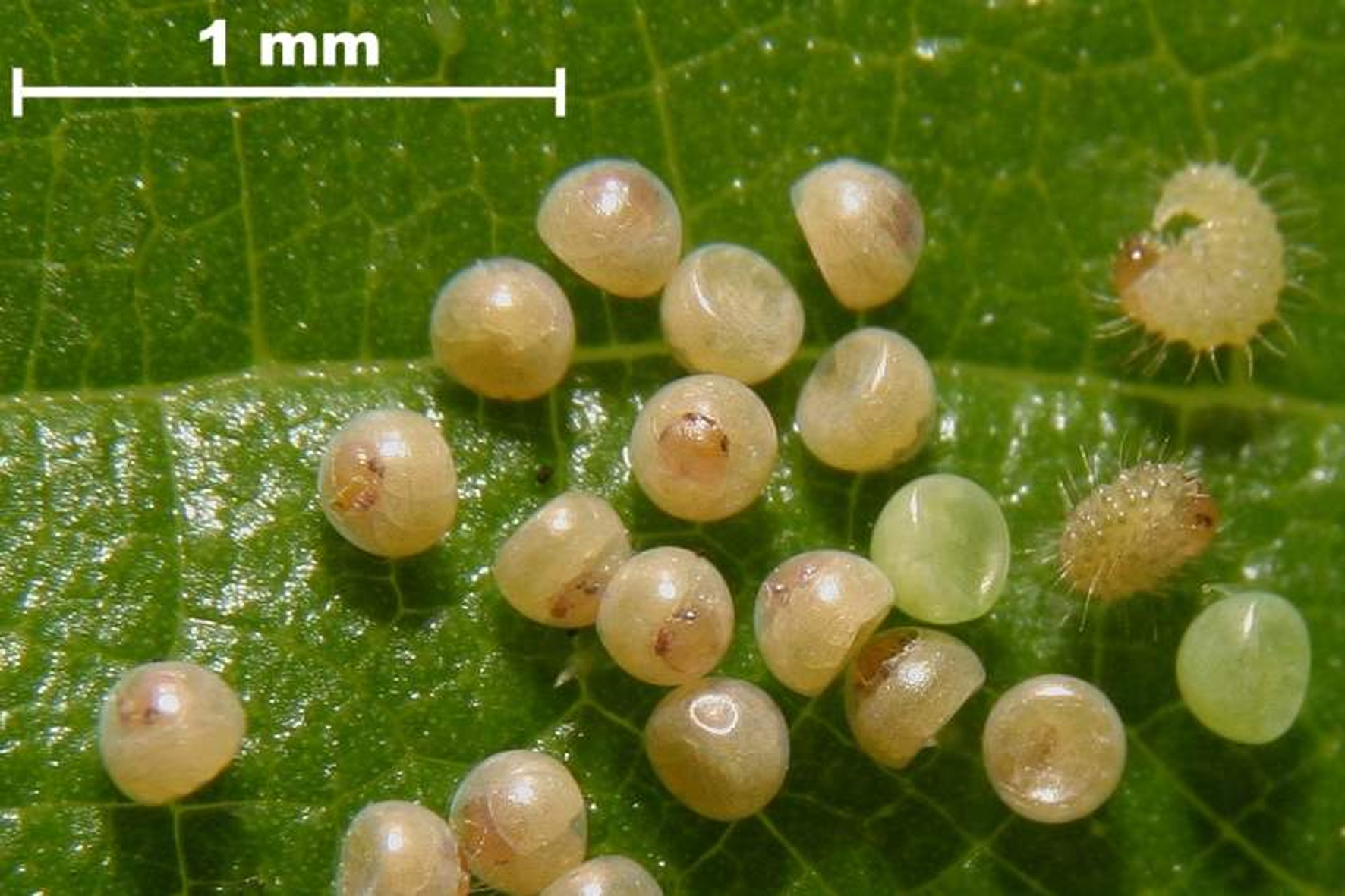
Eggs

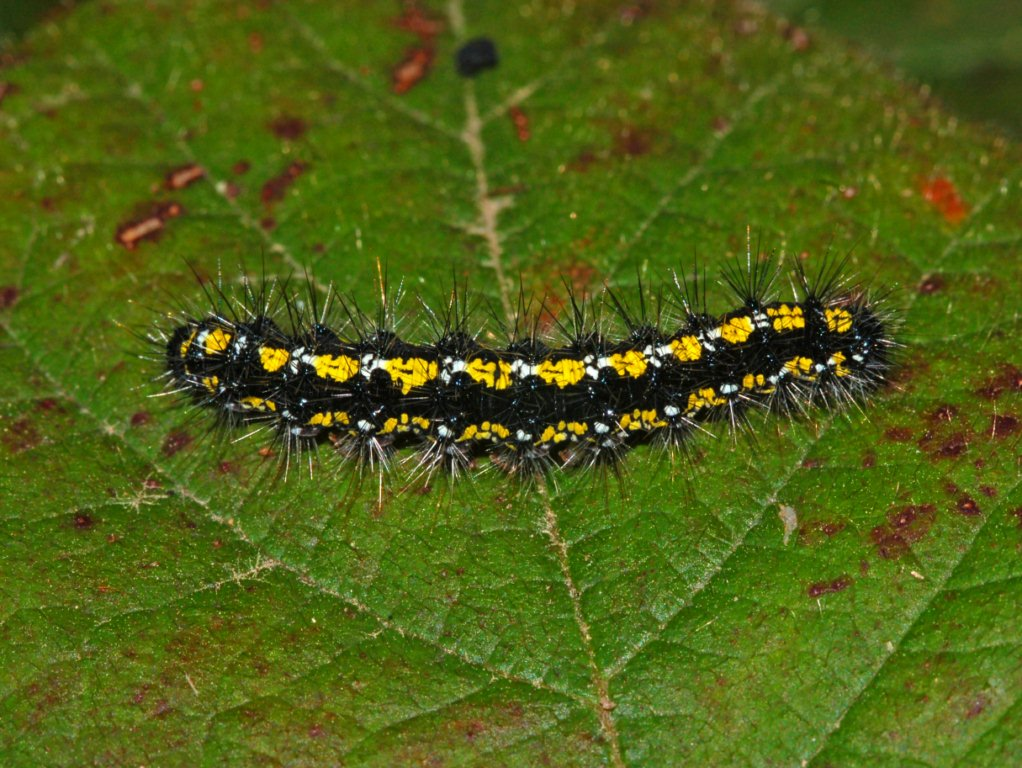
Caterpillar

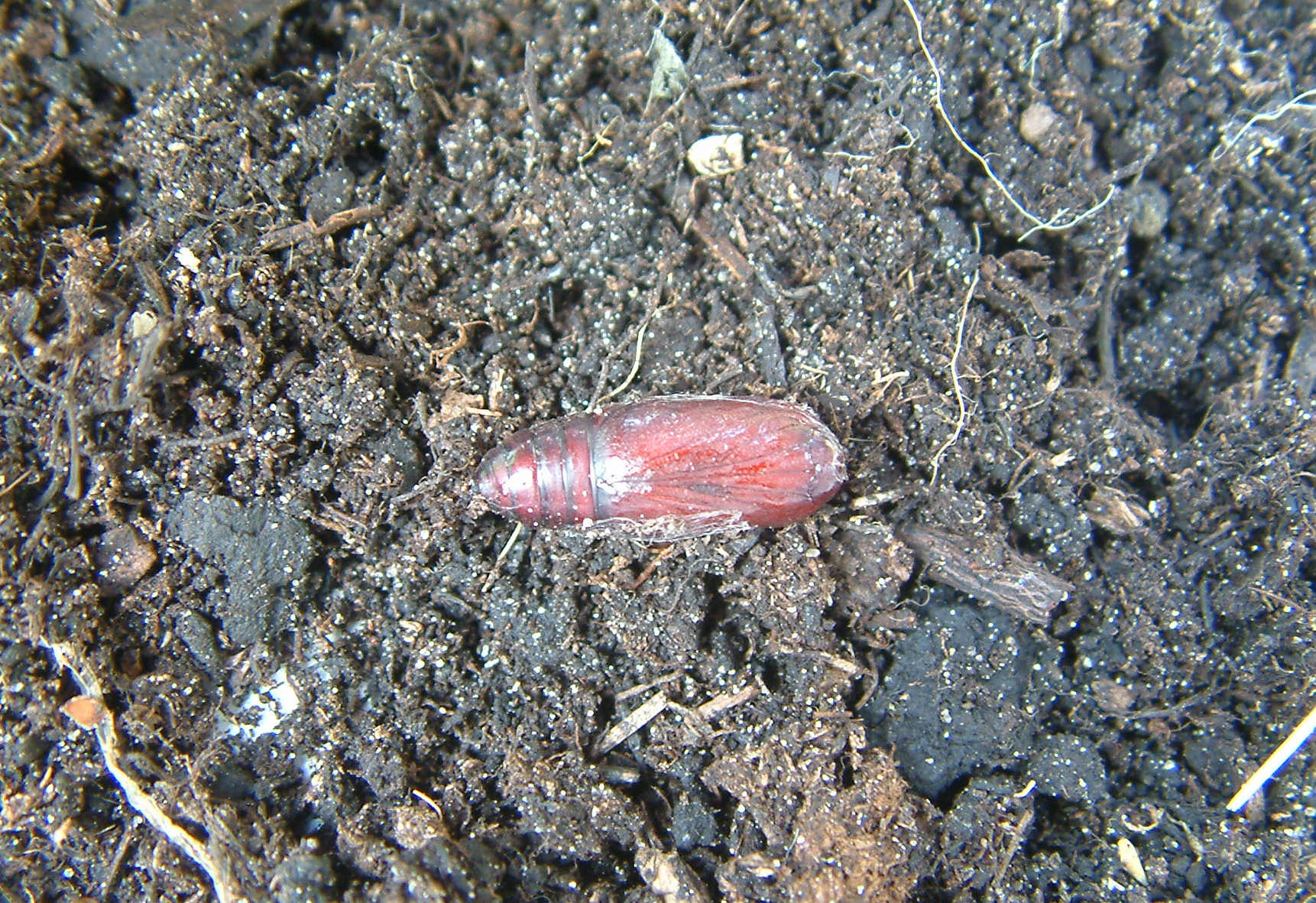
Chrysalis

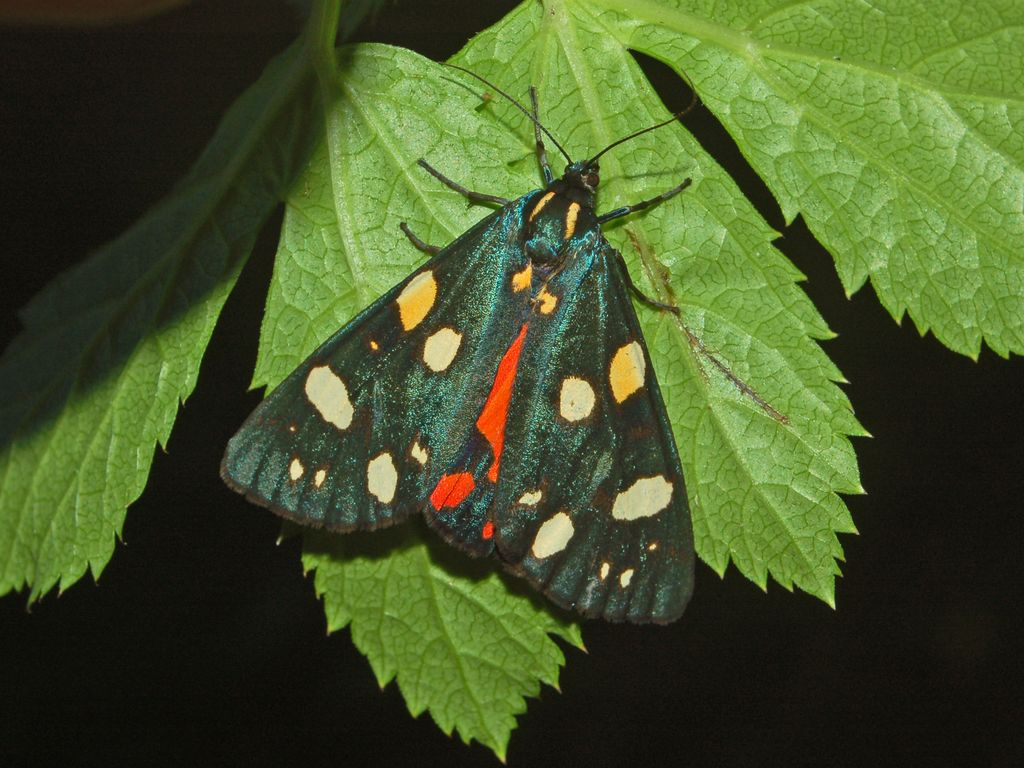
Imago

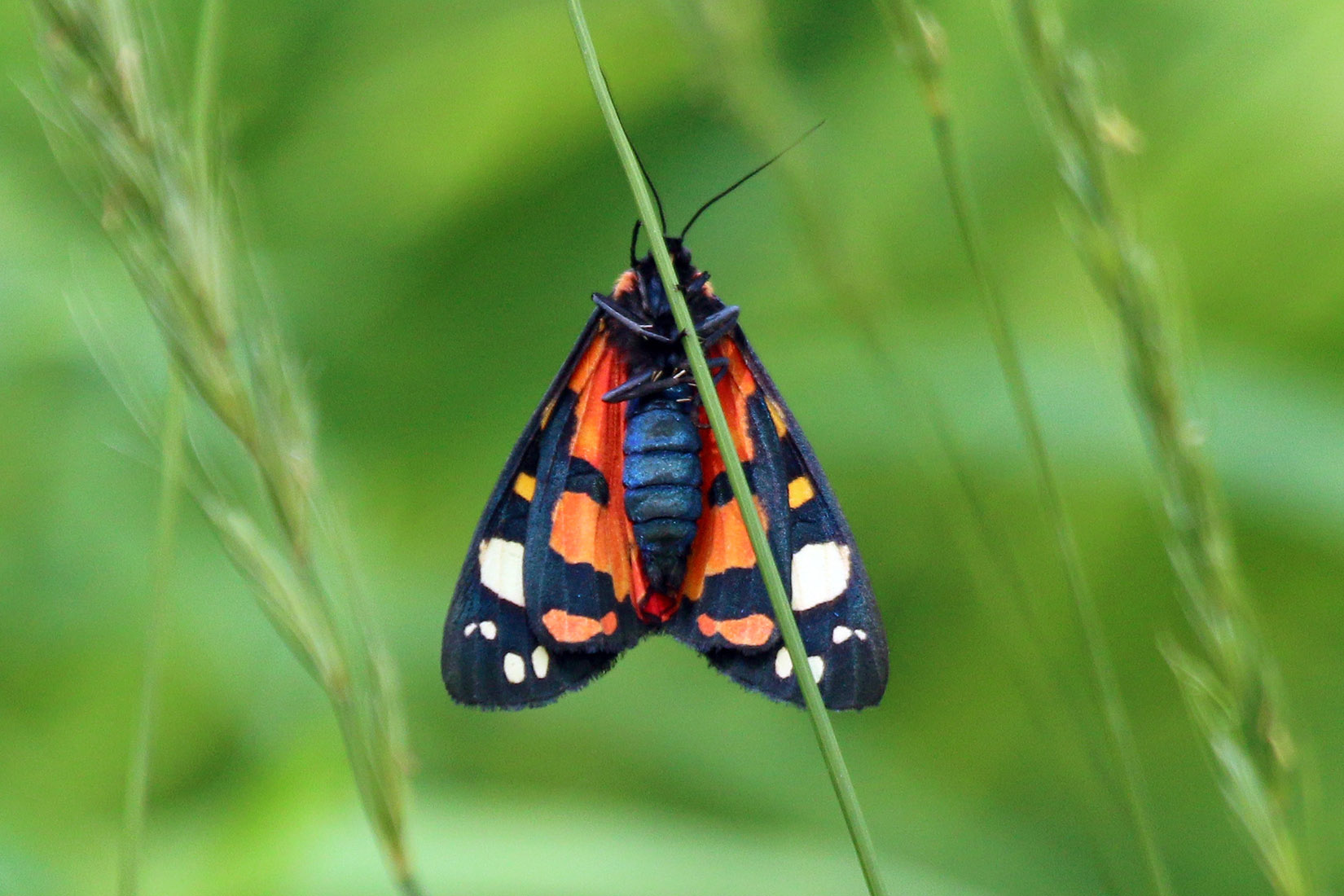

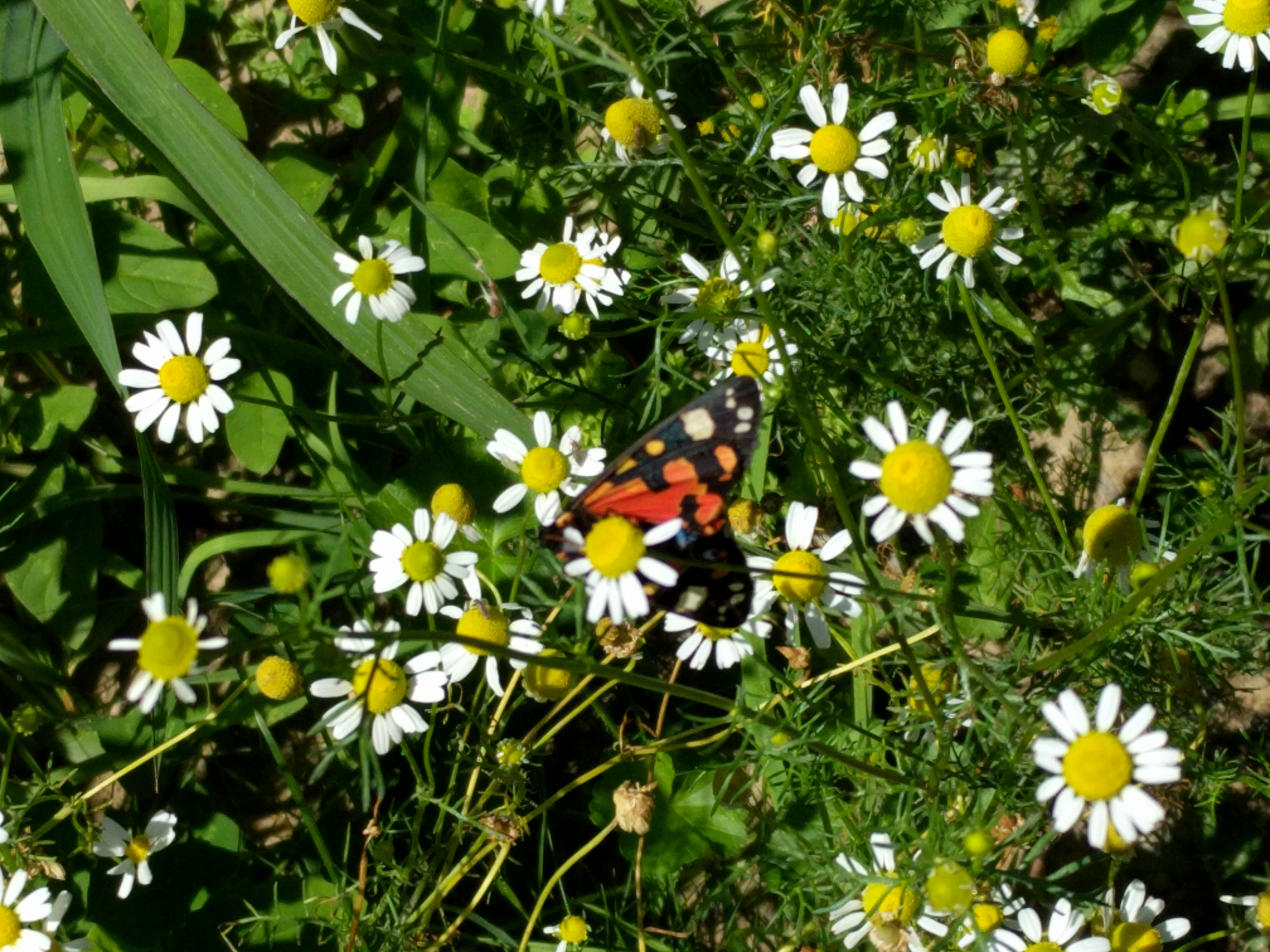

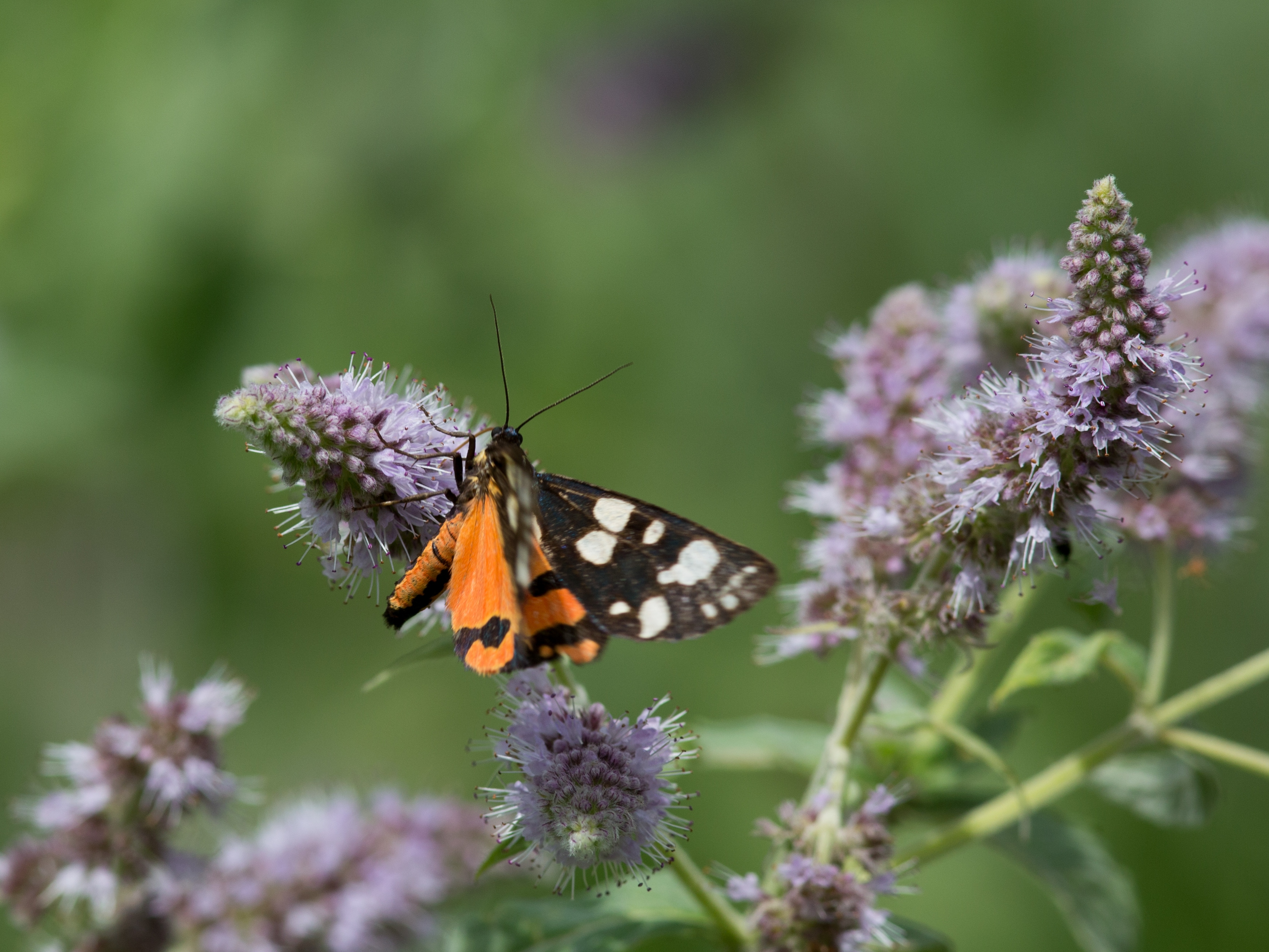

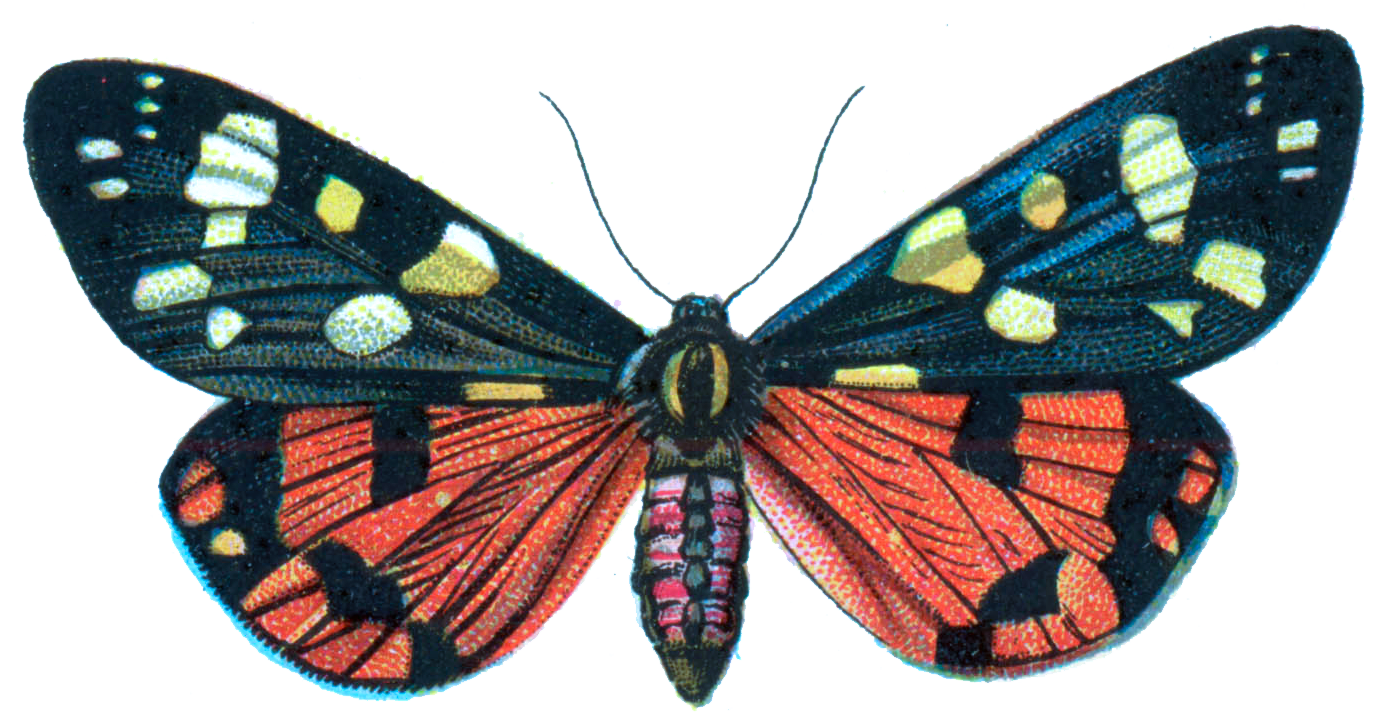

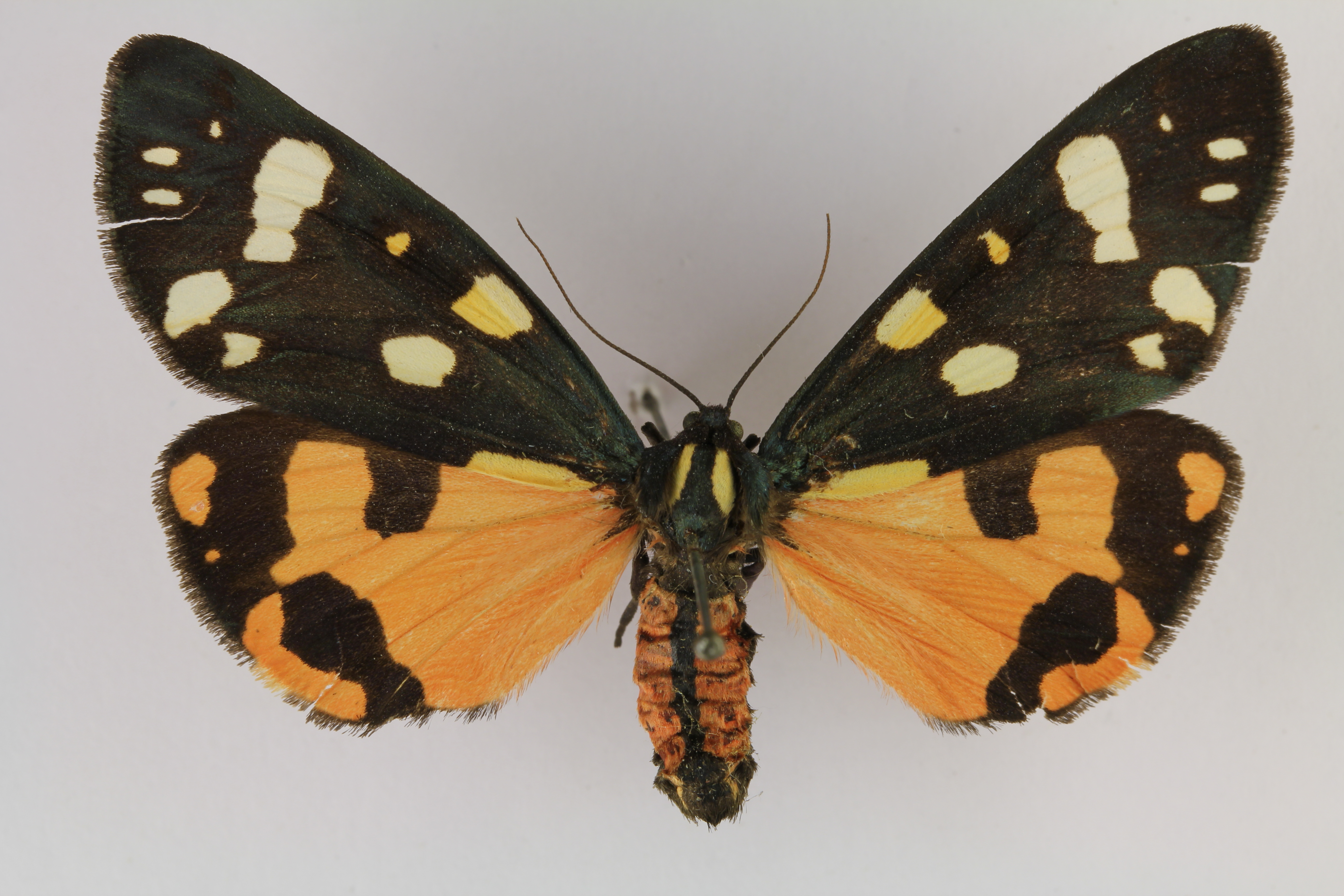

== Bibliography ==
- Dubatolov, V. V. (2010) "Tiger-moths of Eurasia (Lepidoptera, Arctiidae) (Nyctemerini by Rob de Vos & Vladimir V. Dubatolov)". Neue Entomologische Nachrichten. 65: 1–106.
- Fisher, R. A. & Ford, E. B. (1947). "The spread of a gene in natural conditions in a colony of the moth Panaxia dominula L.". Heredity. 1: 143–174.
- Fisher, R. A. & Ford, E. B. (1950). "The 'Sewall Wright' effect". Heredity. 4: 117–119.
- Ford, E. B. & Sheppard, P. M. (1969). "The medionigra polymorphism of Panaxia dominula". Heredity. 24: 112–134.
- Kettlewell, H. B. D. (1943). "A survey of the insect Panaxia (Callimorpha) dominula, L.". Proceedings of the South London Entomological and Natural History Society. 1942-43 (pt. 1): 1-49, pl. I-IV, IVa.
- Kettlewell, H. B. D. (1943) "Original descriptions of new forms of Panaxia (Callimorpha) dominula, L., and Panaxia rossica, Kolenati". The Entomologist's Record and Journal of Variation. 55: 45–48.
- Nardelli, U. & Giandolfo, B. (1996). "Anmerkungen uber die siziliansche Population von Callimorpha dominula L. mit Bschreibung einer neuen Untrart (Lepidoptera: Arctiidae)" [Observations on the population of Callimorpha dominula L. from Sicily, with description of a new subspecies (Lepidoptera: Arctiidae)]. Nachrichten des Entomologischen Vereins, Apollo, N.F. 17 (3): 283–299.
- Sheppard, P. M. (1951). "A quantitive study of two populations of the moth Panaxia dominula (L.)". Heredity. 5: 349–378.
- Sheppard, P. M. (1952). "A note on non-random mating in the moth Panaxia dominula L.". Heredity. 5 349–378.
- Sheppard, P. M. & Cook, L. M. (1962). "The manifold effects of the medionigra gene of the moth Panaxia dominula and the maintenance of polymorphism". Heredity. 17: 415–426.
- Wright, S. (1948). "On the roles of directed and random changes in the frequency of genetics of populations". Evolution. 2: 279–294.
- Thomas, W. (1983) "Eine neue Callimorpha dominula – Unterart aus der Osttürkei (Lep.: Arctiidae)". Entomologische Zeitschrift. 93 (8): 107–110. the animals are colorful
