= Coptotelia calidaria =

Scientific classification
- Kingdom: Animalia
- Phylum: Arthropoda
- Class: Insecta
- Order: Lepidoptera
- Family: Depressariidae
- Genus: Coptotelia
- Species: C. calidaria

Binomial name
- Coptotelia calidaria (Meyrick, 1921)

Synonyms
- Hypercallia calidaria Meyrick, 1921

Species of moth

Coptotelia calidaria is a moth in the family Depressariidae. It was described by Edward Meyrick in 1921. It is found in Brazil.

The wingspan is 19–20 mm. The forewings are pale yellow suffusedly reticulated with crimson with a brownish border running all around the wing, broad on the termen, interrupted in the middle of the costa, connected by a fascia from beyond the costal interruption to before the middle of the dorsum, with an arm from the middle to before the costal interruption, and an excurved streak from near the costal end of this to the dorsum at two-thirds, indented below the middle. There are small round subhyaline (almost glass like) white spots in the disc before and beyond the middle, the second followed by an indistinct dark fuscous dot. There are also whitish marks on the costal edge in middle and at four-fifths. The hindwings are light rosy brownish, becoming whitish towards the base.
