= Cyril Clarke =

British geneticist and lepidopterist

Professor Sir Cyril Clarke KBE FRS FRCP FRCOG
- Born: 22 August 1907; Leicester, England
- Died: 21 November 2000 (aged 93); West Kirby, England
- Education: Gonville and Caius College, Guy's Hospital
- Occupations: Professor of Medicine and consultant physician
- Known for: Pioneering work on prevention of Rh disease, and genetics of Lepidoptera
- Spouse: Frieda (or Féo) Clarke (m. 1935–1998)
- Children: 3 sons: Miles, Charles, John
- Awards: Albert Lasker Award for Clinical Medical Research (1980); Buchanan Medal (1990)
- Scientific career
- Fields: Medicine and genetics
- Workplaces: Liverpool University

Sir Cyril Astley Clarke (22 August 1907 – 21 November 2000) was a British physician, geneticist and lepidopterist. He was honoured for his pioneering work on prevention of Rh disease of the newborn, and also for his work on the genetics of the Lepidoptera (butterflies and moths).

== Biography ==
Cyril Clarke was born on 22 August 1907 in Leicester, England and received his school education at Wyggeston Grammar School for Boys, Leicester and at the independent Oundle School near Peterborough. His interest in butterflies and moths began at school. His studied natural science at Gonville and Caius College, Cambridge, graduating in 1929, and then medicine at Guy's Hospital, London, graduating in 1932. During the Second World War he worked as a medical specialist in the Royal Naval Volunteer Reserve. After the war Clarke worked as a registrar at the Queen Elizabeth Hospital in Birmingham and then as Consultant Physician at the United Liverpool Hospitals. In 1963 he was appointed Director of the Nuffield Unit of Medical Genetics based at the University of Liverpool and two years later was made Professor of Medicine. He held these posts until his retirement in 1972. In retirement he served as President of the Royal College of Physicians (1972–1977)

Clarke helped to develop the technique of giving Rh-negative women inter-muscular injections of anti-RhD antibodies during pregnancy to prevent Rh disease in their newborn babies. This was one of the major advances in preventive medicine in the second half of the 20th century.

Clarke answered an advert in the Bulletin of the Amateur Entomologists’ Society for swallowtail butterfly pupae that had been placed by Philip Sheppard. They met and began working together in their common interest of lepidoptery. From 1959 they started running a moth trap in Caldy Common near West Kirby, Wirral, England. They studied the peppered moth, the scarlet tiger moth and swallowtail butterfly. They published papers on the genetics of Lepidoptera and also on Rh disease. Clarke continued research in his retirement and in 1988 he rediscovered a scarlet tiger moth colony on the Wirral Way, West Kirby, that had been started in 1961 by Philip Sheppard. The colony was useful for study of the genetics of changes in populations.

He married Frieda (or Féo) in 1934. Lady Clarke died in 1998. Cyril Clarke died in 2000. They had three sons, one of whom is a consultant neurologist.

Cyril Clarke Secondary School located in Mataffin, Mbombela, South Africa, near the Mbombela Stadium is named after him.

== Career and awards ==
- Second World War – Medic in Royal Navy Volunteer Reserve
- 1947 to 1958 – Part-time Clinical Lecturer at Liverpool University, England.
- 1958 to 1965 – Reader at Liverpool University, England.
- 1965 to 1972 – Professor of Medicine at Liverpool University, England. Later, Honorary Nuffield Research Fellow, Department of Genetics and Emeritus Professor of Medicine, University of Liverpool. Director, Research Unit, Royal College of Physicians of London.
- 1967 – Lumleian lecture to Royal College of Physicians on Prevention of Rh-Haemolytic Disease

== Awards and accolades ==
- 1969 – Order of the British Empire (CBE)
- 19 March 1970 – Fellow of the Royal Society (FRS)
- 1972 to 1977 – President of the Royal College of Physicians of London.
- 1974 – Knighted
- 1977 – Gairdner Foundation International Award
- 1980 – Lasker Award – Prof Cyril Clarke, together with Dr Ronald Finn, Dr John Gorman, Dr Vincent Freda, and Dr William Pollack were jointly awarded the Albert Lasker Award for Clinical Medical Research for their pioneering work on the rhesus blood group system, the role of rhesus D antibodies in the causation of Rh disease and the prevention of Rh disease.
- 1981 – Linnean Medal from the Linnean Society of London.
- 1990 – Buchanan Medal from the Royal Society of the United Kingdom for work on haemolytic disease of the newborn.
- 1992 – Honorary Degree given by the College of William and Mary, Williamsburg, Virginia, United States.

== Bibliography ==
- Professor Sir Cyril (A.) Clarke (1987), Human Genetics and Medicine (3rd ed.), London: Edward Arnold, ISBN 0-7131-2944-1

== See also ==
- Peppered moth evolution

== Bibliography ==
- Obituary on Liverpool University website – includes a photograph
- 1980 Lasker award to Prof Cyril Clarke
- RCP Presidents

Academic offices
Preceded by The Lord Rosenheim	President of the Royal College of Physicians; 1972–1977	Succeeded by Sir Douglas Black
Awards
Preceded by Gyorgy Karoly Radda	Buchanan Medal; 1990	Succeeded by Denis Parsons Burkitt
