= C. pallida =

C. pallida may refer to:

- Cadrema pallida, a species of fly
- Caladenia pallida, a species of orchid
- Calcaritis pallida, a species of moth
- Calceolaria pallida, a species of flowering plant
- Calleida pallida, a species of beetle
- Calliclava pallida, a species of sea snail
- Camissoniopsis pallida, a species of evening primrose
- Campanula pallida, a species of bellflower
- Cantharis pallida, a species of soldier beetle
- Caphys pallida, a species of snout moth
- Carya pallida, a species of hickory
- Castiarina pallida, a species of beetle
- Castilleja pallida, a species of Indian paintbrush
- Cataxia pallida, a species of spider
- Celtis pallida, a species of hackberry
- Centris pallida, a species of bee
- Centrolepis pallida, a species of flowering plant
- Ceranthia pallida, a species of fly
- Cerithiopsis pallida, a species of sea snail
- Cetonia pallida, a species of beetle
- Chaetophiloscia pallida, a species of woodlouse in the family Philosciidae
- Chamaepsila pallida, a species of fly
- Chamaesaracha pallida, a species of nightshade
- Chelidonura pallida, a species of sea slug
- Cheritra pallida, a species of butterfly
- Cheumatopsyche pallida, a species of caddisfly in the subfamily Hydropsychinae
- Chionochloa pallida, a species of tussock grass
- Chloronia pallida, a species of dobsonfly
- Chloroplaga pallida, a species of moth in the subfamily Chloephorinae
- Chrysoperla pallida, a species of lacewing
- Chusquea pallida, a species of bamboo
- Cicurina pallida, a species of spider in the family Dictynidae
- Clermontia pallida, a species of Hawaiian lobelioid
- Clivina pallida, a species of ground beetle
- Clostera pallida, a species of moth
- Clubionina pallida, a species of sac spider
- Cnodontes pallida, a species of butterfly
- Coccoloba pallida, a species of flowering plant
- Cologania pallida, a species of legume
- Columnea pallida, a species of flowering plant
- Commelina pallida, a species of dayflower
- Connomyia pallida, a species of robber fly
- Corbula pallida, a species of clam
- Coryphantha pallida, a species of cactus
- Corythucha pallida, a species of lace bug
- Cosmotoma pallida, a species of longhorn beetle
- Costasiella pallida, a species of sea slug
- Crambidia pallida, a species of moth
- Cranioleuca pallida, the Pallid Spinetail, a species of bird
- Crataerina pallida, the swift lousefly, a species of biting fly
- Crematogaster pallida, a species of ant
- Crotalaria pallida, a species of legume
- Cryptotreta pallida, a species of fly
- Ctenusa pallida, a species of moth
- Cyathissa pallida, a species of moth
- Cyclothone pallida, a species of bristlemouth
- Cymbalaria pallida, a species of flowering plant
- Cymosafia pallida, a species of moth
- Cyrtandra pallida, a species of flowering plant
- Cytora pallida, a species of land snail

== Synonyms ==
- Canna pallida, a synonym for Canna indica, a species of flowering plant
- Cassida pallida, a synonym for Cassida flaveola, a species of leaf beetle
- Catocala pallida, a synonym for Catocala amatrix, a species of moth
- Celosia pallida, a synonym for Celosia argentea, a species of cockscomb
- Chalcophora pallida, a synonym for Chalcophora angulicollis, a species of beetle
- Chionochloa pallida, a synonym for Rytidosperma pallidum, a species of grass
- Cirrhaea pallida, a synonym for Cirrhaea loddigesii, a species of orchid
- Cissus pallida, a synonym for Cissus adnata, a species of woody vine
- Cloeon pallida, a synonym for Cloeon dipterum, a species of mayfly
- Coleophora pallida, a synonym for Coleophora tanaceti, a species of moth
- Colias pallida, a synonym for Colias erate, a species of butterfly
- Coris pallida, a synonym for Coris batuensis, the Batu coris, a species of wrasse
- Cryphia pallida, a synonym for Cryphia pallidioides, a species of moth
- Curtomerus pallida, a synonym for Curtomerus flavus, a species of beetle
- Cyclosia pallida, a synonym for Cyclosia papilionaris, a species of moth
