= Psila angustata =

Scientific classification
- Domain: Eukaryota
- Kingdom: Animalia
- Phylum: Arthropoda
- Class: Insecta
- Order: Diptera
- Family: Psilidae
- Genus: Psila
- Species: P. angustata

Binomial name
- Psila angustata Cresson, 1919

Species of fly

Psila angustata is a species of rust flies in the family Psilidae.
