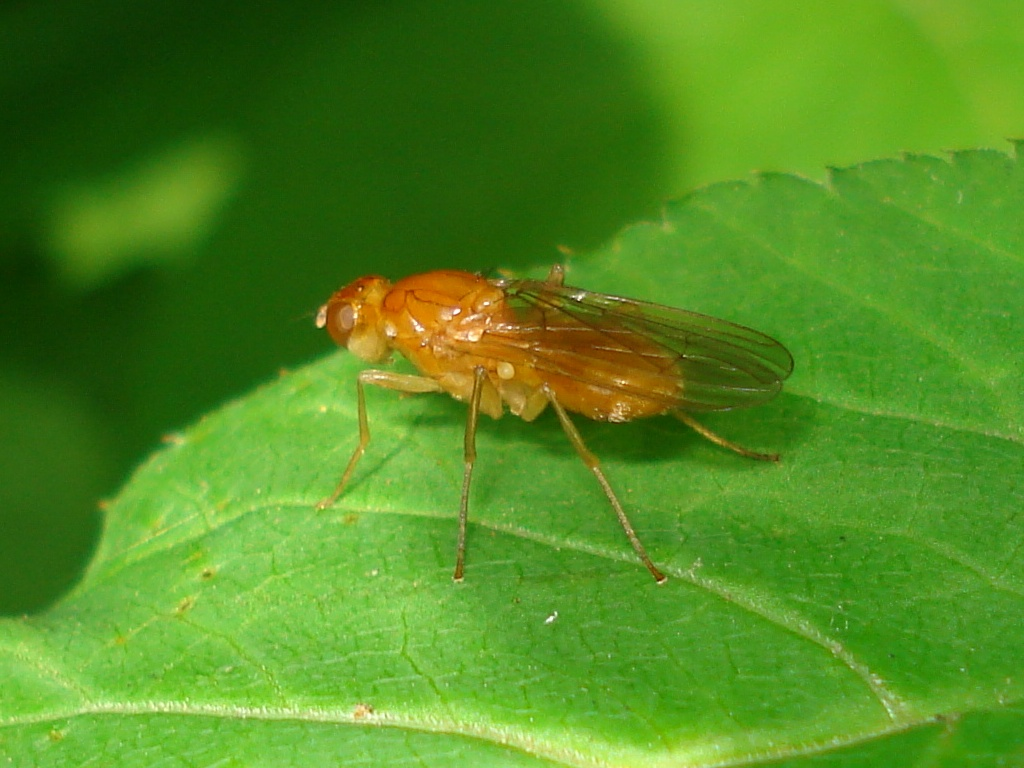
- Psila fimetaria. Side view

Scientific classification
- Kingdom: Animalia
- Phylum: Arthropoda
- Class: Insecta
- Order: Diptera
- Family: Psilidae
- Genus: Psila
- Species: P. fimetaria

Binomial name
- Psila fimetaria (Linnaeus, 1761)

Synonyms
- Musca fimetaria Linnaeus, 1761; Musca rufa Scopoli, 1763; Psila rufescens Stephens, 1829; Oblicia testacea Robineau-Desvoidy, 1830; Pelethophila flava Hagenbach, 1822

= Psila fimetaria =

Species of fly

Psila fimetaria is a species of fly, a member of the family Psilidae.

== Distribution ==
This species is present in part of Europe (Belgium, Great Britain, Czech Republic, Denmark, Germany, Hungary, Italy, Lithuania, Slovakia, Ireland), in Russia and in North Africa.

== Habitat ==
These common flies inhabit woods and forests, bushes and herbs, especially damp places, lush vegetation, hedge rows and amongst the crops.

== Description ==
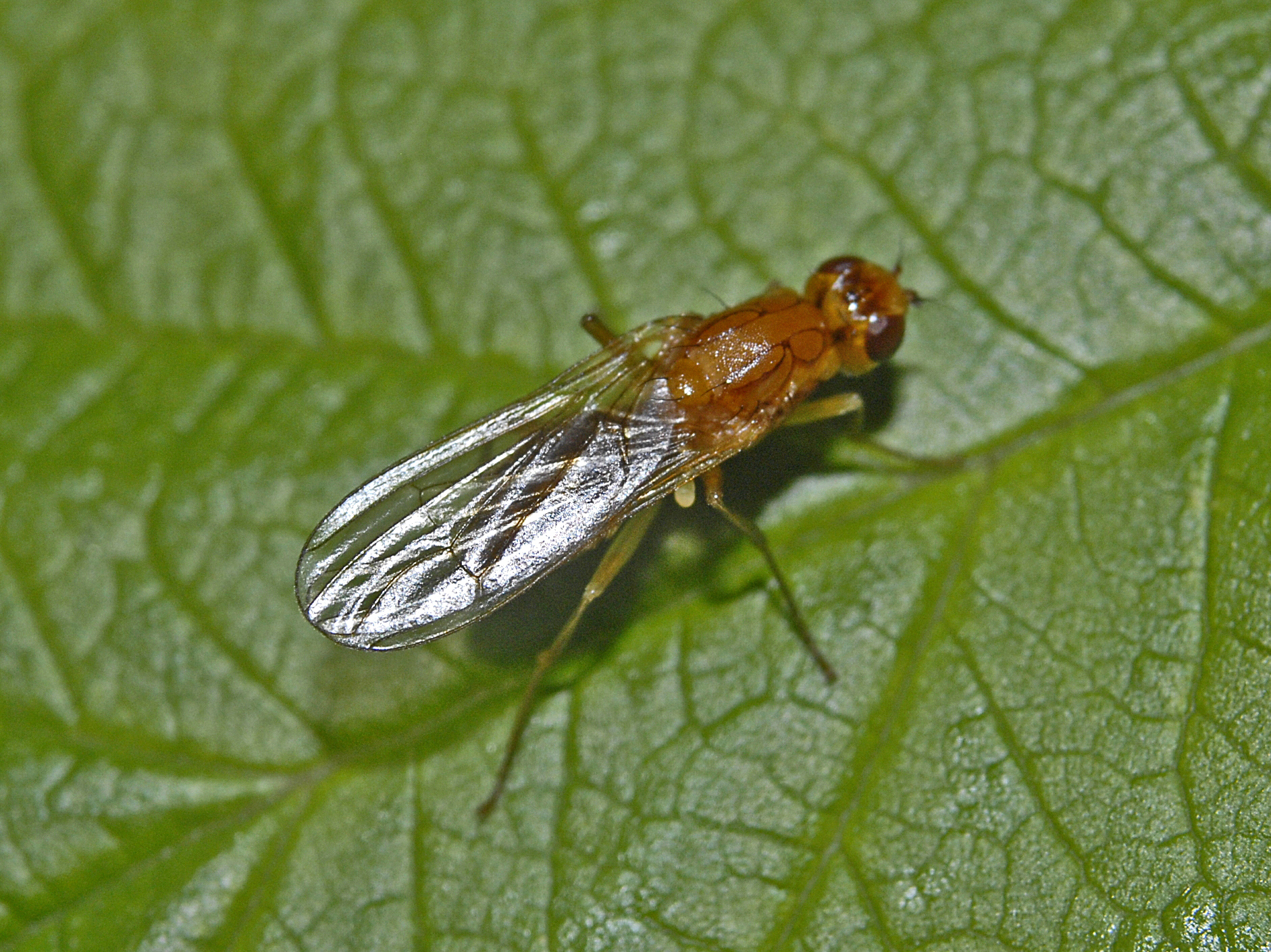
Psila fimetaria. Dorsal view

Psila fimetaria can reach a length of 7.7–8.8 millimetres (0.30–0.35 in). Body is basically yellow-red, covered with short black bristles. On the abdomen tergites are sometimes distinctly browned. Head is red, with a black ocellar triangle. Eyes are large and reniformes. Palps are yellow. Antennae are short, red, with the third subconical segment a little thicker and black at the base. Arista shows a longer pubescence. Legs are long, yellowish, slightly dark at the tip of tarsi. Wings are transparent, a little yellowed at the anterior edge.

As with all species of the genus Psila, the males have no thickened femora on the hind legs and the females have only a simple ovipositor.

This species is very similar to Psila merdari, but in P. fimetaria the hairs beneath the second antennal joint are longer and the third antennal joint is darkened on the outer side at the base of the arista.

== Biology ==
Adults can be found from May to September. Imago are not very active Larvae are phytophagous and oligophagous. They develop in the roots, bulbs and non-woody stems of plants, especially on Carex.

== Bibliography ==
- Joachim Haupt, Hiroko Haupt: Fliegen und Mücken. Beobachtung, Lebensweise. 1. Auflage. Naturbuch-Verlag, Jena und Stuttgart 1995, ISBN 3-89440-278-4.
- Pape T. & Thompson F.C. (eds) - Systema Dipterorum
