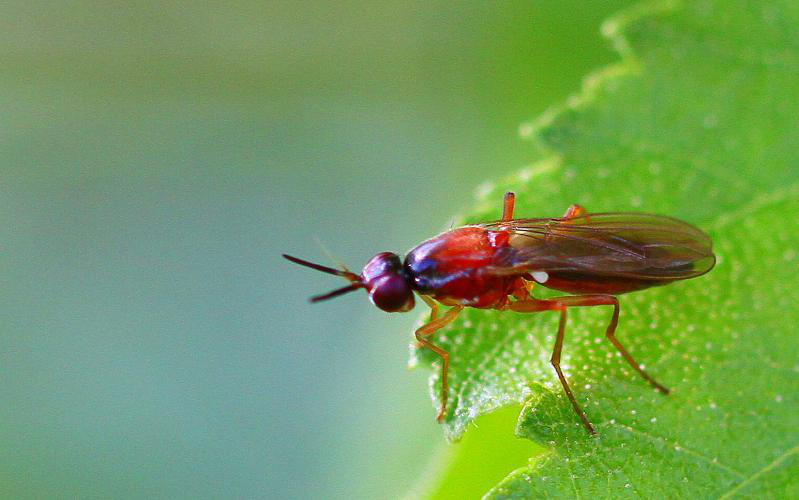
- Loxocera albiseta Netherlands

Scientific classification
- Kingdom: Animalia
- Phylum: Arthropoda
- Class: Insecta
- Order: Diptera
- Family: Psilidae
- Genus: Loxocera
- Species: L. albiseta

Binomial name
- Loxocera albiseta (Schrank, 1803)

= Loxocera albiseta =

Species of fly

Loxocera albiseta is a species of fly in the family Psilidae. It is found in the Palearctic. The interocular space is red orange or red brown with a black triangle. Scutellum red.The face lacks a black median band.The anterior mesonotum is largely black, the posterior red without black. For terms see Morphology of Diptera.
