= Psila collaris =

Scientific classification
- Domain: Eukaryota
- Kingdom: Animalia
- Phylum: Arthropoda
- Class: Insecta
- Order: Diptera
- Family: Psilidae
- Genus: Psila
- Species: P. collaris

Binomial name
- Psila collaris Loew, 1869

Species of fly

Psila collaris is a species of rust flies (insects in the family Psilidae).
