= Psila bivittata =

Scientific classification
- Domain: Eukaryota
- Kingdom: Animalia
- Phylum: Arthropoda
- Class: Insecta
- Order: Diptera
- Family: Psilidae
- Genus: Psila
- Species: P. bivittata

Binomial name
- Psila bivittata Loew, 1869

Species of fly

Psila bivittata is a species of rust flies (insects in the family Psilidae).
