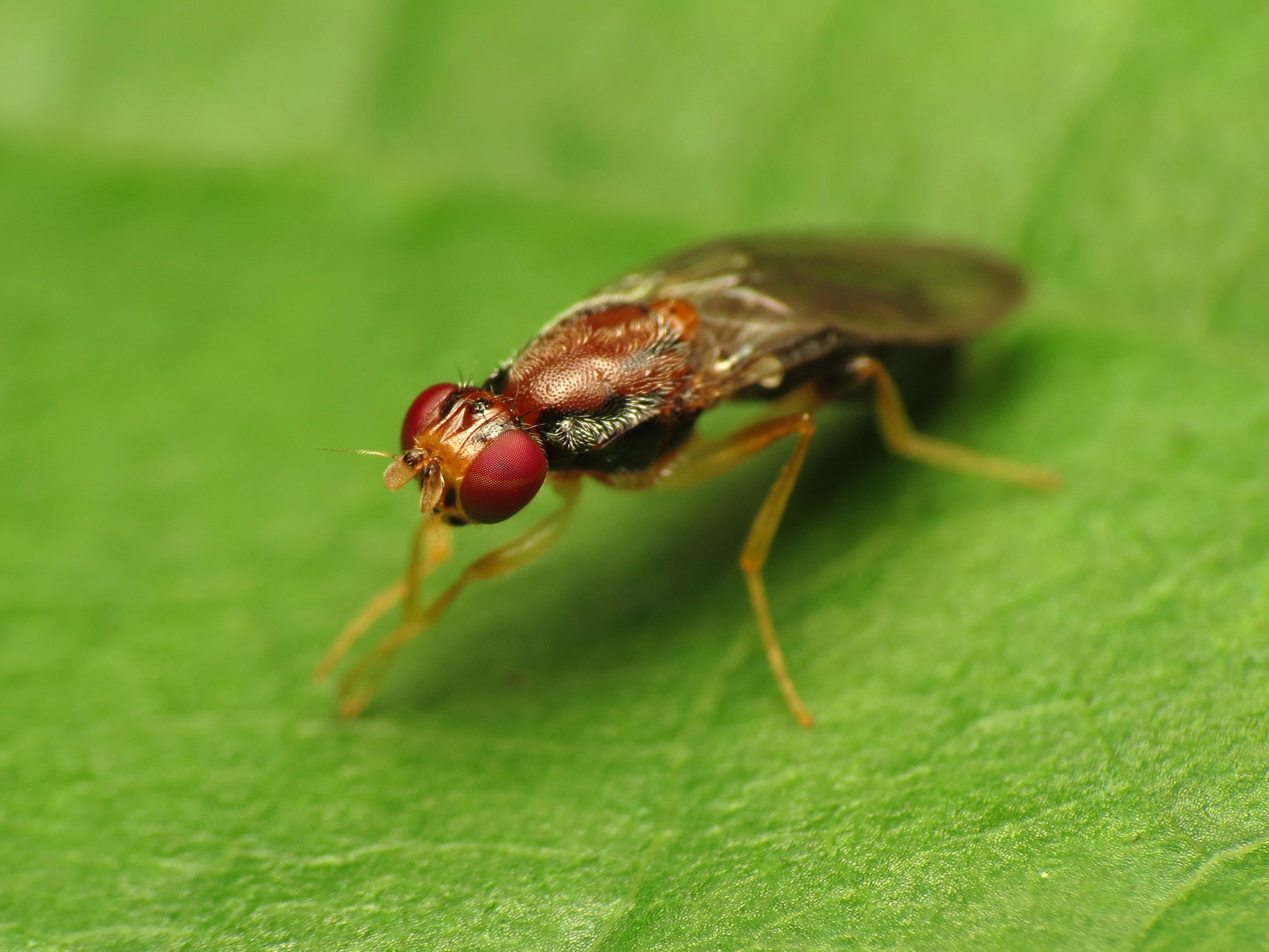

Scientific classification
- Domain: Eukaryota
- Kingdom: Animalia
- Phylum: Arthropoda
- Class: Insecta
- Order: Diptera
- Family: Psilidae
- Genus: Chyliza
- Species: C. erudita

Binomial name
- Chyliza erudita Melander, 1920

= Chyliza erudita =

Species of fly

Chyliza erudita is a species of rust flies in the family Psilidae.

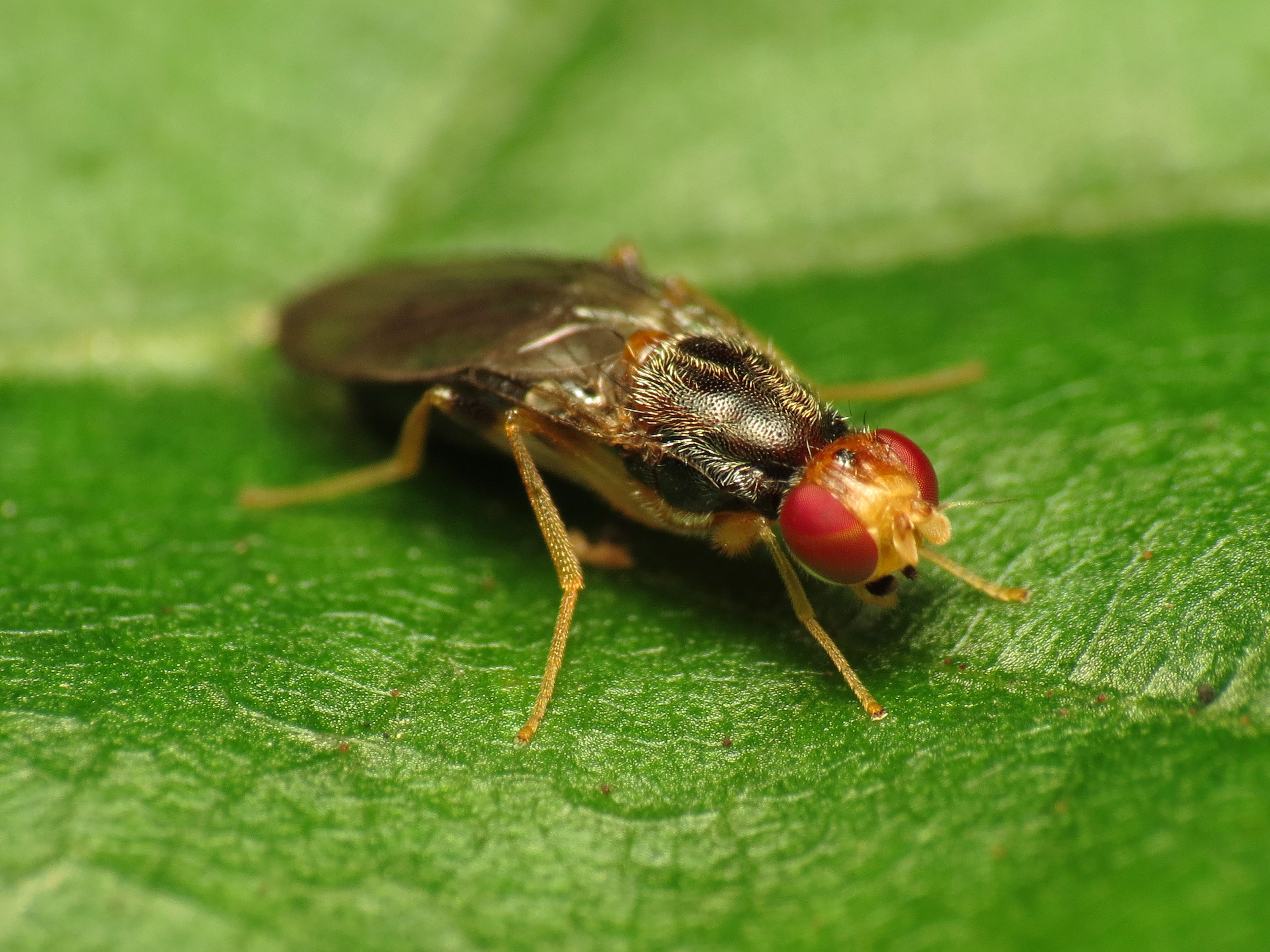

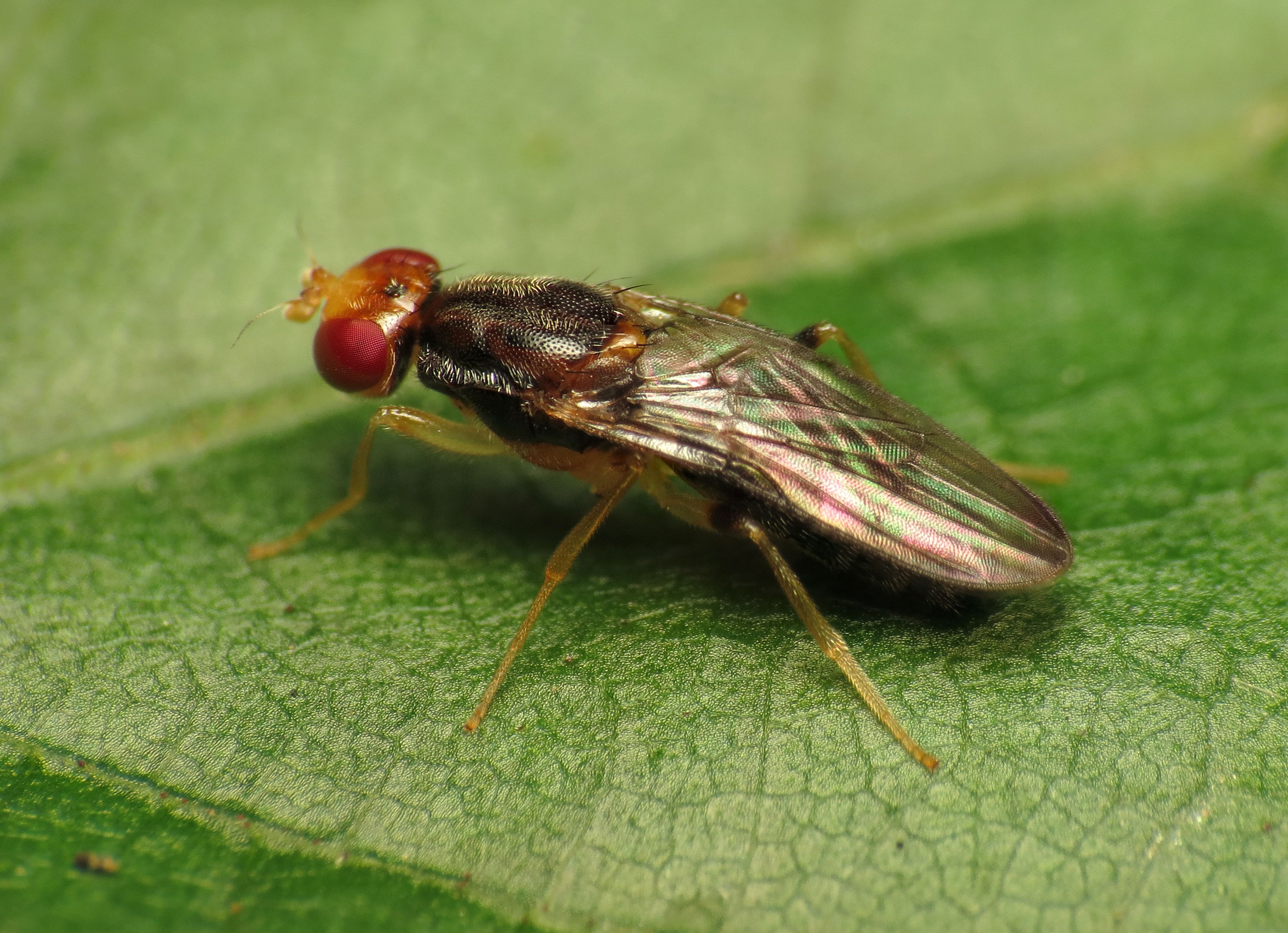
