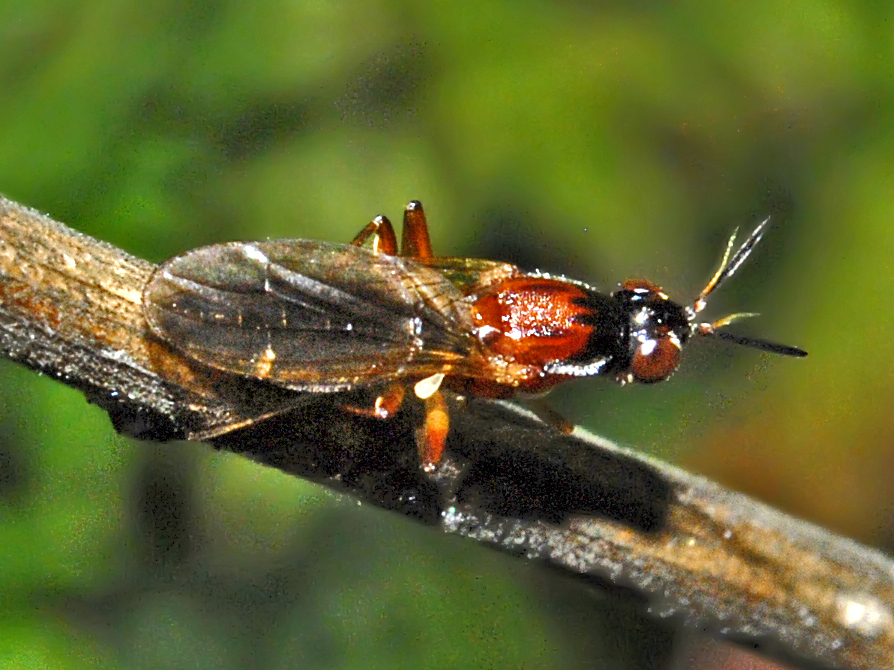
- Loxocera aristata, dorsal view
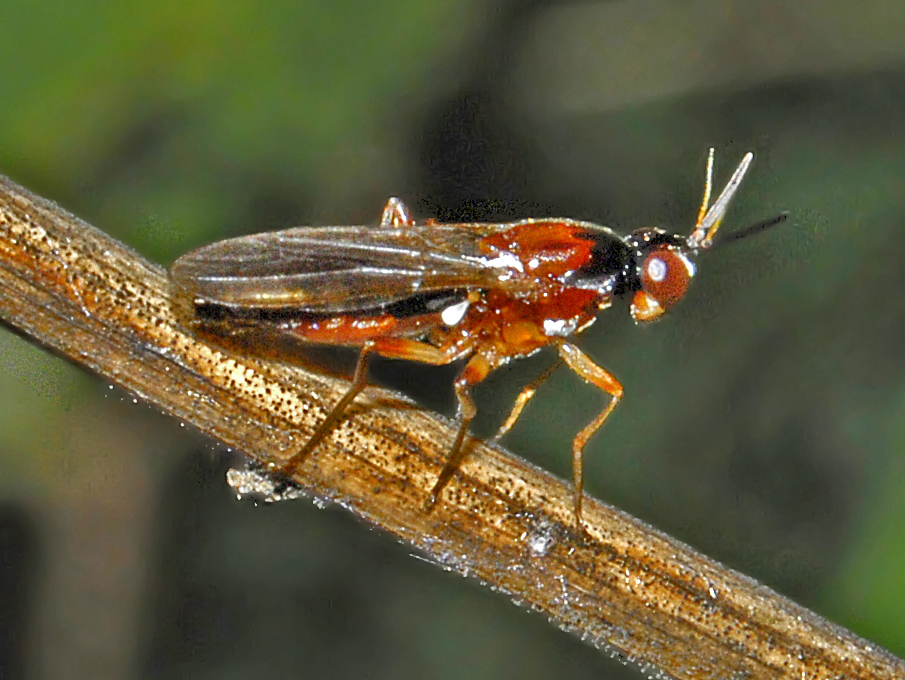
- Loxocera aristata, lateral view

Scientific classification
- Kingdom: Animalia
- Phylum: Arthropoda
- Class: Insecta
- Order: Diptera
- Family: Psilidae
- Genus: Loxocera
- Species: L. aristata

Binomial name
- Loxocera aristata (Panzer, 1801)

Synonyms
- Loxocera yerburyi Austen, 1899; Loxocera atriceps Bigot, 1886; Loxocera maculata Rondani, 1876; Loxocera didimiata Roser, 1840; Loxocera intermedia Robineau-Desvoidy, 1830; Loxocera elongata Meigen, 1826

= Loxocera aristata =

Species of fly

Loxocera aristata is a species of fly and member of the family Psilidae.

== Description ==
Loxocera aristata can reach a length of 7–12 millimetres (0.28–0.47 in). These flies, which resemble certain Ichneumonidae, have a dark, slender body. Head is black, thorax is black anteriorly and orange-brown posteriorly, while the abdomen is black. Legs are yellowish. Wings are hyaline.The third antennal segment conspicuously elongated with a conspicuous arista.

== Distribution ==
This species is present in Europe. It can be found in hedge rows and grassy meadows.

== Bibliography ==
- Systema Dipterorum. Pape T. & Thompson F.C. (eds)
- Collin, J.E. 1944a. The British species of Psilidae (Diptera). Entomologist's Monthly Magazine 80: 214-224.
- Greve, L. & Skartveit, J. 2001. The genus Loxocera (Psilidae, Diptera) in Norway. Norw. J. Entomol. 48, 329-334
