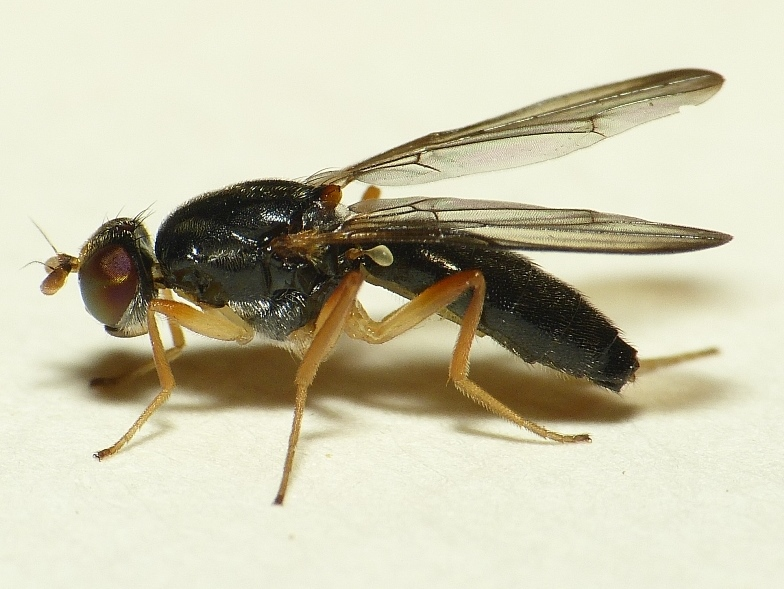
- Chyliza leptogaster

Scientific classification
- Kingdom: Animalia
- Phylum: Arthropoda
- Class: Insecta
- Order: Diptera
- Family: Psilidae
- Genus: Chyliza
- Species: C. leptogaster

Binomial name
- Chyliza leptogaster Panzer, 1798

Synonyms
- Musca leptogaster Panzer, 1798; Chyliza scutellata (Fabricius, 1798)

= Chyliza leptogaster =

Species of fly

Chyliza leptogaster is a species of rust flies (insects in the family Psilidae).

== Range ==
Andorra, Belgium, Britain, Czech Republic, Denmark, Germany, Hungary, Ireland, Italy, Norway, Sicily, Slovakia, Spain & Switzerland.
