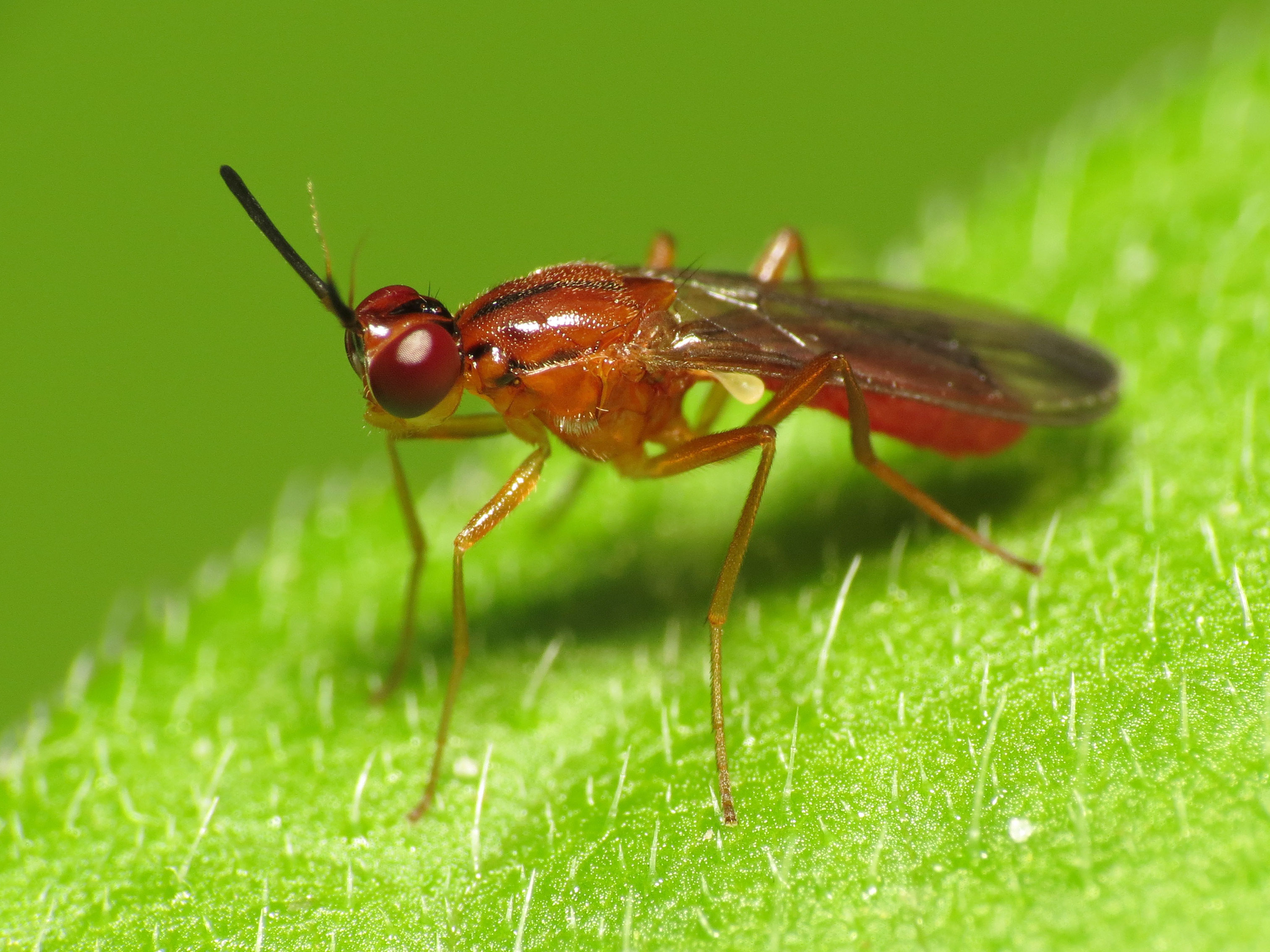

Scientific classification
- Kingdom: Animalia
- Phylum: Arthropoda
- Class: Insecta
- Order: Diptera
- Family: Psilidae
- Genus: Loxocera
- Species: L. cylindrica

Binomial name
- Loxocera cylindrica Say, 1823

Synonyms
- Loxocera atricornis Harris, 1835; Loxocera obsoleta Johnson, 1920; Loxocera pectoralis Loew, 1869; Loxocera pleuritica Loew, 1869

= Loxocera cylindrica =

Species of fly

Loxocera cylindrica is a species of rust flies in the family Psilidae.

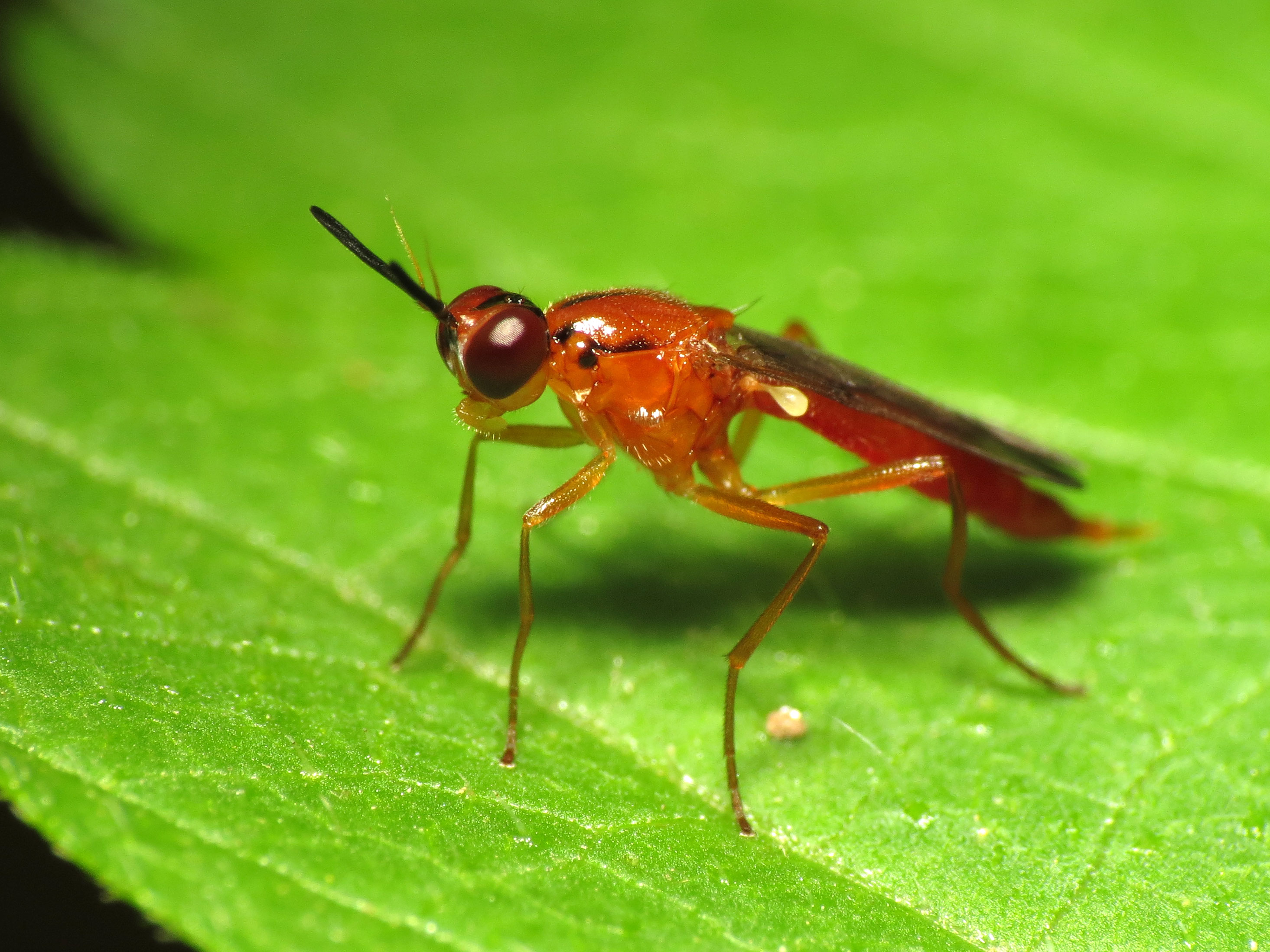
