= Chyliza elegans =

Scientific classification
- Kingdom: Animalia
- Phylum: Arthropoda
- Class: Insecta
- Order: Diptera
- Family: Psilidae
- Genus: Chyliza
- Species: C. elegans

Binomial name
- Chyliza elegans Hendel, 1913

Species of fly

Chyliza elegans is a species of rust flies (insects in the family Psilidae). It is found in Taiwan.
