= Psila fallax =

Scientific classification
- Domain: Eukaryota
- Kingdom: Animalia
- Phylum: Arthropoda
- Class: Insecta
- Order: Diptera
- Family: Psilidae
- Genus: Psila
- Species: P. fallax

Binomial name
- Psila fallax (Loew, 1869)

Synonyms
- Loxocera fallax Loew, 1869

Species of fly

Psila fallax is a species of rust flies (insects in the family Psilidae).
