= Psila perpolita =

Scientific classification
- Domain: Eukaryota
- Kingdom: Animalia
- Phylum: Arthropoda
- Class: Insecta
- Order: Diptera
- Family: Psilidae
- Genus: Psila
- Species: P. perpolita

Binomial name
- Psila perpolita (Johnson, 1920)

Synonyms
- Pseudopsila perpolita Johnson, 1920

Species of fly

Psila perpolita is a species of rust flies (insects in the family Psilidae).
