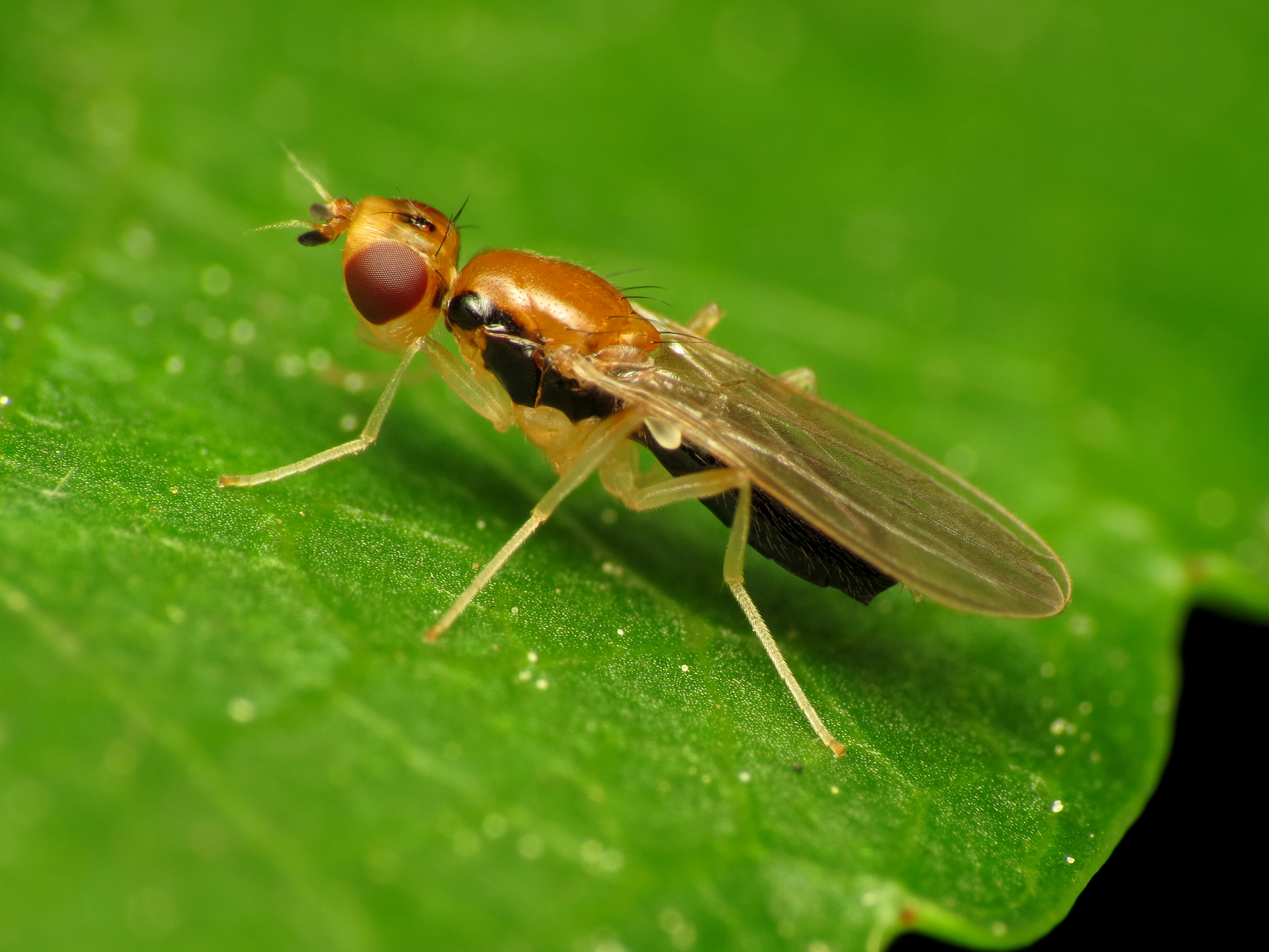

Scientific classification
- Domain: Eukaryota
- Kingdom: Animalia
- Phylum: Arthropoda
- Class: Insecta
- Order: Diptera
- Family: Psilidae
- Genus: Psila
- Species: P. lateralis

Binomial name
- Psila lateralis Loew, 1860

Synonyms
- Psila colorata Melander, 1920

= Psila lateralis =

Species of fly

Psila lateralis is a species of rust flies (insects in the family Psilidae).
