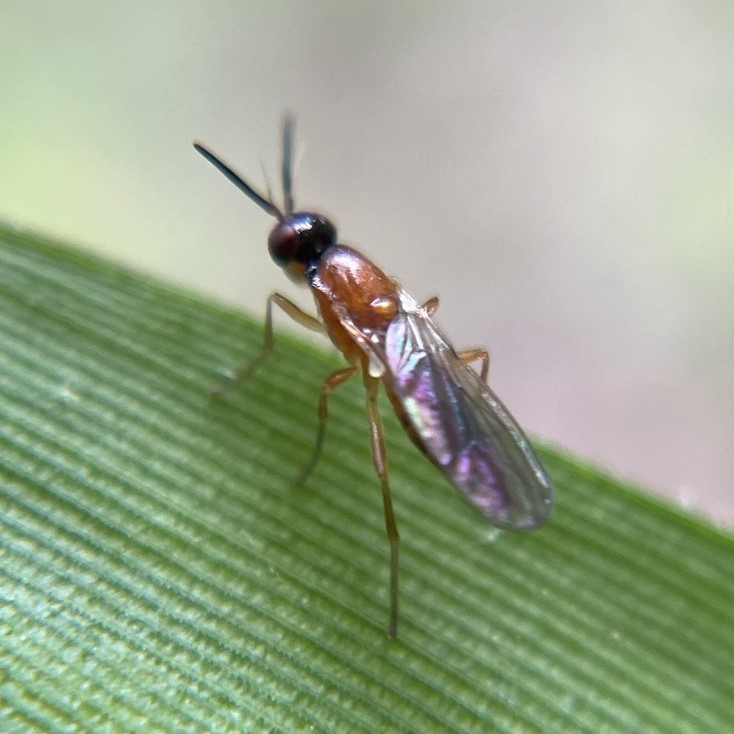

Scientific classification
- Kingdom: Animalia
- Phylum: Arthropoda
- Class: Insecta
- Order: Diptera
- Family: Psilidae
- Genus: Loxocera
- Species: L. collaris

Binomial name
- Loxocera collaris Loew, 1869

= Loxocera collaris =

Species of fly

Loxocera collaris is a species of rust fly in the family Psilidae.
