= Crambidia myrlosea =

Scientific classification
- Kingdom: Animalia
- Phylum: Arthropoda
- Class: Insecta
- Order: Lepidoptera
- Superfamily: Noctuoidea
- Family: Erebidae
- Subfamily: Arctiinae
- Genus: Crambidia
- Species: C. myrlosea

Binomial name
- Crambidia myrlosea Dyar, 1917

Species of moth

Crambidia myrlosea is a moth of the family Erebidae. It was described by Harrison Gray Dyar Jr. in 1917. It is found from the US states of New Mexico, Texas and Arizona, south to Belize.
