= Crambidia impura =

Scientific classification
- Domain: Eukaryota
- Kingdom: Animalia
- Phylum: Arthropoda
- Class: Insecta
- Order: Lepidoptera
- Superfamily: Noctuoidea
- Family: Erebidae
- Subfamily: Arctiinae
- Genus: Crambidia
- Species: C. impura

Binomial name
- Crambidia impura Barnes & McDunnough, 1913

Species of moth

Crambidia impura is a moth of the family Erebidae. It was described by William Barnes and James Halliday McDunnough in 1913. There are two disjunct populations. It has been recorded from southern Rocky Mountain states, the Yukon and northern British Columbia and Alberta.

Adults are light grey. Adults are on wing from August to September.

The larvae probably feed on lichens.
