= Cosmotoma adjuncta =

Scientific classification
- Domain: Eukaryota
- Kingdom: Animalia
- Phylum: Arthropoda
- Class: Insecta
- Order: Coleoptera
- Suborder: Polyphaga
- Infraorder: Cucujiformia
- Family: Cerambycidae
- Genus: Cosmotoma
- Species: C. adjuncta

Binomial name
- Cosmotoma adjuncta (Thomson, 1860)

Species of beetle

Cosmotoma adjuncta is a species of longhorn beetles of the subfamily Lamiinae. It was described by Thomson in 1860, and is widely distributed throughout South America, as well as Central American countries such as Panama, Costa Rica, and Bolivia.
