= Crambidia uniformis =

Scientific classification
- Kingdom: Animalia
- Phylum: Arthropoda
- Class: Insecta
- Order: Lepidoptera
- Superfamily: Noctuoidea
- Family: Erebidae
- Subfamily: Arctiinae
- Genus: Crambidia
- Species: C. uniformis

Binomial name
- Crambidia uniformis Dyar, 1898

Species of moth

Crambidia uniformis, the uniform lichen moth, is a moth of the family Erebidae. It was described by Harrison Gray Dyar Jr. in 1898. It is found from eastern North America, including Alabama, Florida, Georgia, Indiana, Iowa, Kentucky, Maryland, North Carolina, Ohio, Oklahoma, South Carolina, Tennessee and West Virginia.

The wingspan is 12–18 mm.
