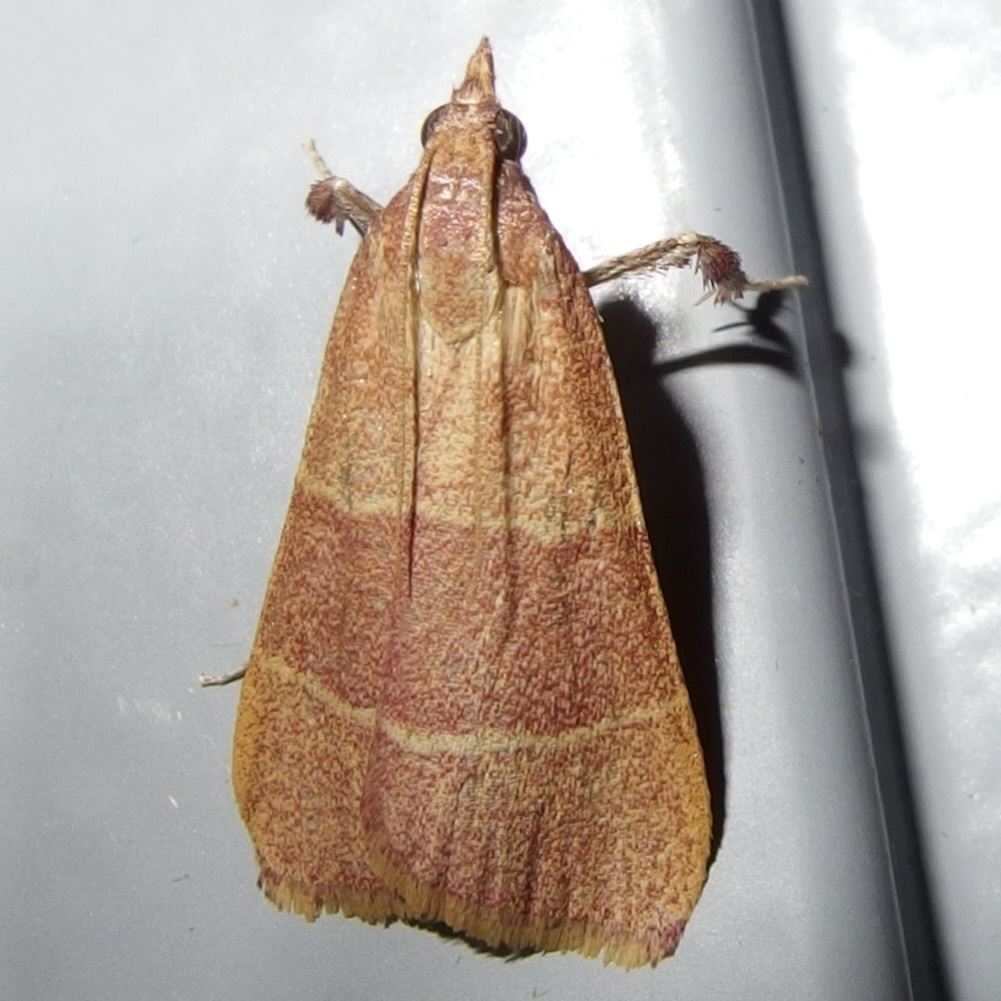

Scientific classification
- Domain: Eukaryota
- Kingdom: Animalia
- Phylum: Arthropoda
- Class: Insecta
- Order: Lepidoptera
- Family: Pyralidae
- Genus: Caphys
- Species: C. arizonensis

Binomial name
- Caphys arizonensis Munroe, 1970

= Caphys arizonensis =

Species of moth

Caphys arizonensis is a species of snout moth in the genus Caphys. It was described by Eugene G. Munroe in 1970, and is known from Arizona, United States, from which its species epithet is derived.
