= Cosmotoma sertifer =

Scientific classification
- Domain: Eukaryota
- Kingdom: Animalia
- Phylum: Arthropoda
- Class: Insecta
- Order: Coleoptera
- Suborder: Polyphaga
- Infraorder: Cucujiformia
- Family: Cerambycidae
- Genus: Cosmotoma
- Species: C. sertifer

Binomial name
- Cosmotoma sertifer (Audinet-Serville, 1835)

Species of beetle

Cosmotoma sertifer is a species of longhorn beetles of the subfamily Lamiinae. It was described by Audinet-Serville in 1835, and is known from Brazil.
