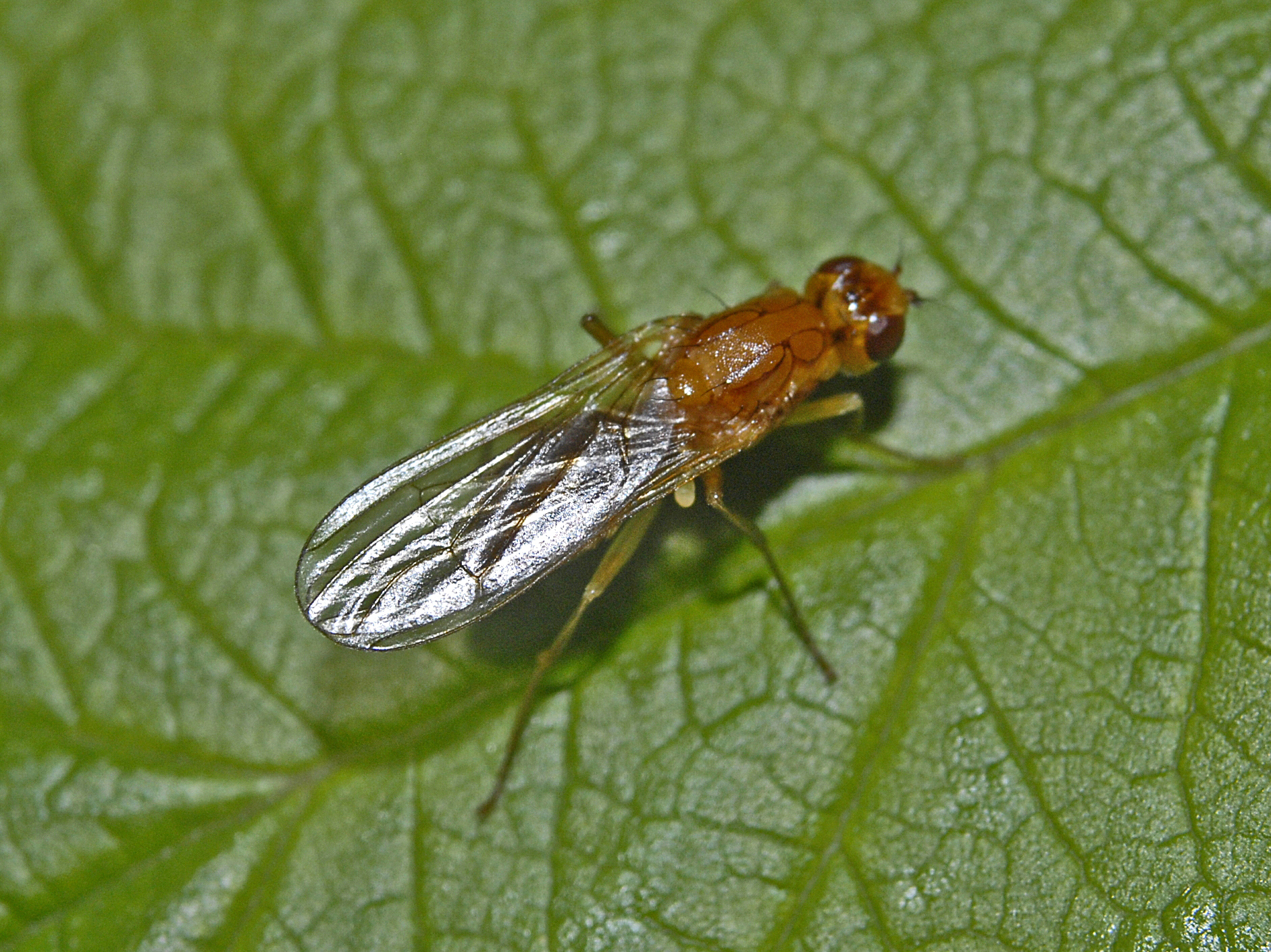
- Psila fimetaria

Scientific classification
- Kingdom: Animalia
- Phylum: Arthropoda
- Class: Insecta
- Order: Diptera
- Family: Psilidae
- Subfamily: Psilinae
- Genus: Psila; Meigen, 1803

= Psila =

Genus of flies

Psila is a European genus of flies which is a member of the family Psilidae or rust flies.

== Genera ==
- Psila acmocephala
- Psila aethiopica
- Psila albiseta
- Psila amurensis
- Psila andreji
- Psila angustata
- Psila apicalis
- Psila arbustorum
- Psila asiatica
- Psila atlasica
- Psila atra
- Psila atrata
- Psila bicolor
- Psila bimaculata
- Psila bivittata
- Psila calobatoides
- Psila caucasica
- Psila celidoptera
- Psila clunalis
- Psila collaris
- Psila crassula
- Psila dichroa
- Psila dimidiata
- Psila dimorpha
- Psila dolichocera
- Psila dubia
- Psila emiliae
- Psila exigua
- Psila fallax
- Psila fenestralis
- Psila fimetaria
- Psila flavigena
- Psila freidbergi
- Psila freyi
- Psila frontalis
- Psila fulviseta
- Psila gracilis
- Psila hebraica
- Psila hennigi
- Psila hexachaeta
- Psila himalayensis
- Psila huashana
- Psila humeralis
- Psila indica
- Psila iwasai
- Psila jakutica
- Psila japonica
- Psila kanmiyai
- Psila kashmirica
- Psila kaszabi
- Psila kovalevi
- Psila krivosheinae
- Psila lateralis
- Psila levis
- Psila limbatella
- Psila lineata
- Psila longipennis
- Psila luteifrons
- Psila luteola
- Psila macra
- Psila maculata
- Psila maculipennis
- Psila magna
- Psila maritima
- Psila martineki
- Psila megacephala
- Psila melanocera
- Psila merdaria
- Psila merzi
- Psila michelseni
- Psila microcera
- Psila microphthalma
- Psila mixta
- Psila mongolica
- Psila morio
- Psila mucrifera
- Psila musiva
- Psila nartschukae
- Psila nartshukae
- Psila negrobovi
- Psila nemoralis
- Psila nigra
- Psila nigricollis
- Psila nigricornis
- Psila nigrifulva
- Psila nigripalpis
- Psila nigriseta
- Psila nigromaculata
- Psila nigrotaeniata
- Psila nitida
- Psila notata
- Psila obscuritarsis
- Psila orientalis
- Psila oxycera
- Psila ozerovi
- Psila pallida
- Psila pectoralis
- Psila perpolita
- Psila persimilis
- Psila potanini
- Psila problematica
- Psila pseudobicolor
- Psila pteropleuralis
- Psila pullata
- Psila qinlingana
- Psila quadrilineata
- Psila rossolimoae
- Psila rozkosnyi
- Psila rufa
- Psila sanguinolenta
- Psila sardoa
- Psila shatalkini
- Psila sibirica
- Psila silacruscula
- Psila sonora
- Psila stackelbergi
- Psila sternalis
- Psila strigata
- Psila subtilis
- Psila szechuana
- Psila tarbagotaica
- Psila tenebrica
- Psila tetrachaeta
- Psila tibetana
- Psila triorbiseta
- Psila washingtona
- Psila villosula
