= Crambidia dusca =

Scientific classification
- Domain: Eukaryota
- Kingdom: Animalia
- Phylum: Arthropoda
- Class: Insecta
- Order: Lepidoptera
- Superfamily: Noctuoidea
- Family: Erebidae
- Subfamily: Arctiinae
- Genus: Crambidia
- Species: C. dusca

Binomial name
- Crambidia dusca Barnes & McDunnough, 1913

Species of moth

Crambidia dusca is a moth of the family Erebidae. It was described by William Barnes and James Halliday McDunnough in 1913. It is found in North America, where it has been recorded from California and Ontario.

The wingspan is about 27 mm.
