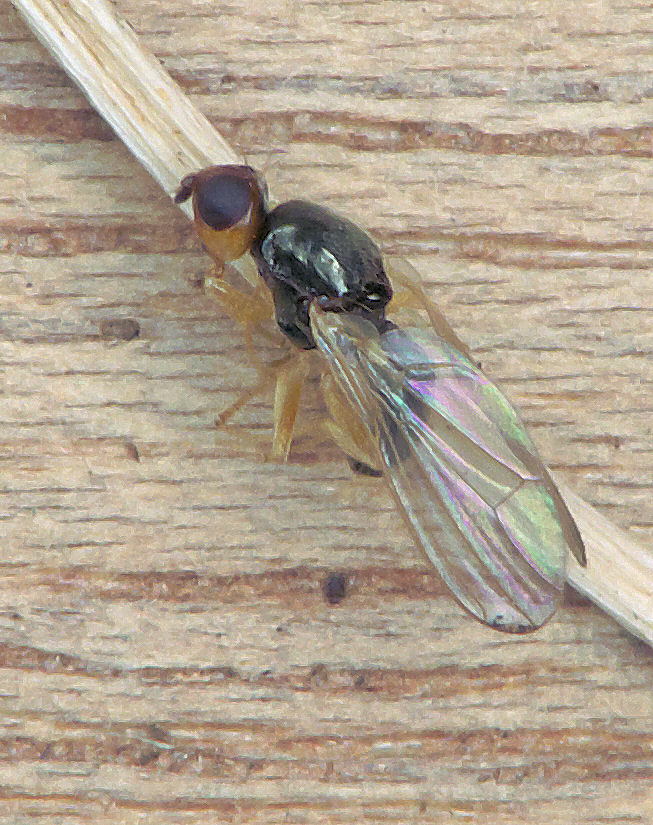

Scientific classification
- Kingdom: Animalia
- Phylum: Arthropoda
- Class: Insecta
- Order: Diptera
- Family: Psilidae
- Genus: Chamaepsila
- Species: C. rosae

Binomial name
- Chamaepsila rosae (Fabricius, 1794)

Synonyms
- Musca rosae Fabricius, 1794; Psila rosae (Fabricius, 1794); Chamaepsila hennigi Thompson & Pont, 1994

= Carrot fly =

Species of fly

The carrot fly (Chamaepsila rosae) is a pest of gardens and farms, and mainly affects the crop of carrots, but can also attack parsnips, parsley and celery. It is a member of the family Psilidae (order Diptera).

== Larvae ==
Crop damage is caused by the creamy-yellow larvae (maggots) feeding on the outer layers of the carrot root. In autumn, they may penetrate further into the root. The legless larvae are up to 10 mm in length.

== Symptoms of infestation ==
Foliage becomes wilted and discoloured. Leaves turn rusty red to scarlet with some yellowing. Rusty-brown tunnels are seen under the outer skin of mature roots.

== Control ==
The flies lay their eggs around the developing carrots; the larvae, once hatched, burrow into the root. As female carrot flies are very low flying, the best method of prevention is to erect a barrier around the crop at least 2 feet (60 cm) high. Alternatively horticultural fleece may be used as a floating mulch to cover the crop. Because the carrot fly is attracted to host plants by odor, masking the smell of the host plant by planting odoriferous companion crops such as onions, chives, and garlic can successfully deter attack. Intermixing of crops can also be a fruitful way to confuse and avoid carrot fly attack. Some plants such as rosemary and sage are also used to deter the carrot fly. Newer varieties of carrot which claim to be resistant to carrot fly (e.g. "Flyaway") may be used. Another method of control is to use heavier, fine plastic mesh available from garden centers and over the internet made specially for the purpose. This can be in the form of a surrounding wall or a complete "cage". Some form of support framework is necessary to prevent the netting from flattening the foliage. Also the bottom of the netting needs to be in close contact or buried in the soil as it is believed that the eggs are laid on bare soil. When the maggots hatch they then crawl towards the carrots so a soil level barrier is necessary.

Commercially available beneficial nematodes (Steinernema spp.) can be applied to the soil surrounding the carrot crop, where they will infect the damaging carrot root fly larvae.

== Latin name ==
The original species name of Musca rosae (Fabricius in Entomologia systematica emendata et aucta (1794)) was originally occupied by Musca rosae (De Geer 1776), which was itself a synonym for the hoverfly species Musca pyrastri Linnaeus, 1758 (now Scaeva pyrastri). The new name of Chamaepsila hennigi was proposed for the Carrot fly by Thompson & Pont in 1994. As the name rosae Fabricius was well known for this major crop pest, applications were made to the International Commission on Zoological Nomenclature for suppression of the name rosae of De Geer and the conservation of rosae of Fabricius. In 2006 they ruled under their plenary powers that rosae Fabricius, 1794 was not to be regarded as invalid by reason of being a junior primary homonym of Musca rosae De Geer, 1776.
