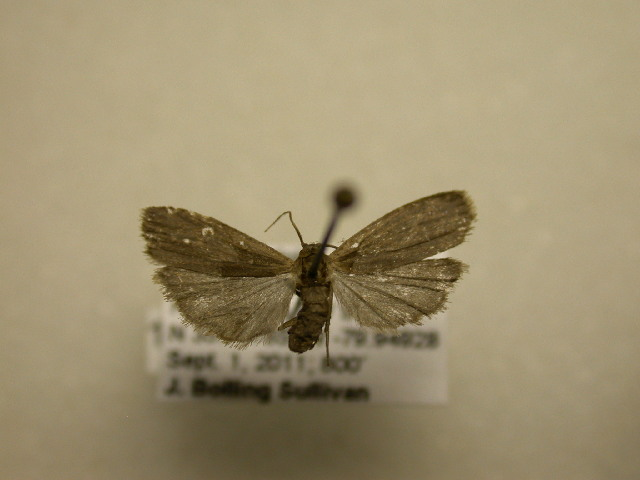

Scientific classification
- Kingdom: Animalia
- Phylum: Arthropoda
- Class: Insecta
- Order: Lepidoptera
- Superfamily: Noctuoidea
- Family: Erebidae
- Subfamily: Arctiinae
- Genus: Crambidia
- Species: C. lithosioides

Binomial name
- Crambidia lithosioides Dyar, 1898

= Crambidia lithosioides =

Species of moth

Crambidia lithosioides, the dark gray lichen moth, is a moth of the family Erebidae. It was described by Harrison Gray Dyar Jr. in 1898. It is found in the United States from North Carolina to Florida and from Kentucky to Mississippi.

The larvae feed on lichens.
