= Caphys subrosealis =

Scientific classification
- Kingdom: Animalia
- Phylum: Arthropoda
- Class: Insecta
- Order: Lepidoptera
- Family: Pyralidae
- Genus: Caphys
- Species: C. subrosealis

Binomial name
- Caphys subrosealis Walker, 1866

Species of moth

Caphys subrosealis is a species of snout moth in the genus Caphys. It was described by Francis Walker in 1866, and is known from Honduras.
