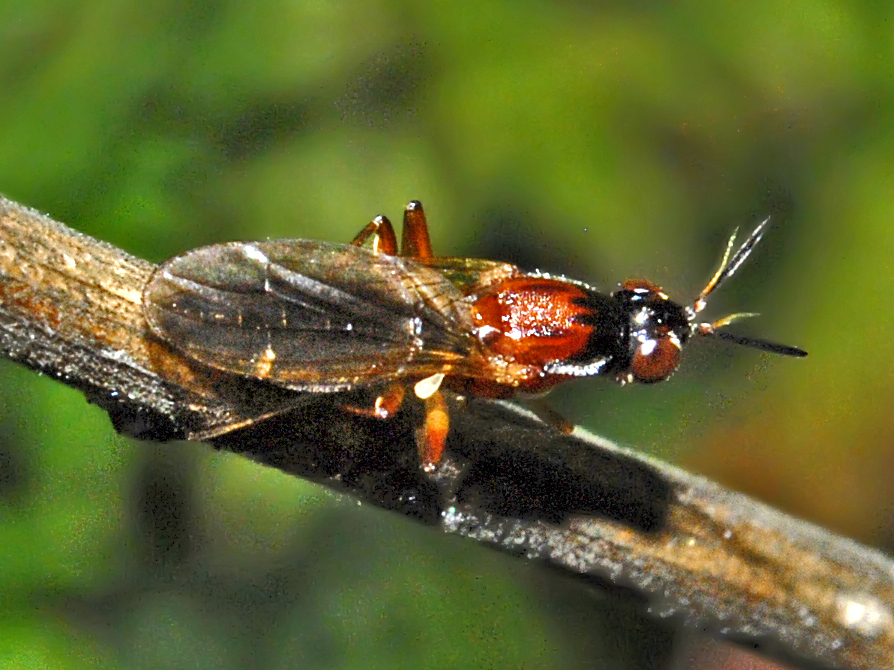
- Loxocera aristata

Scientific classification
- Kingdom: Animalia
- Phylum: Arthropoda
- Class: Insecta
- Order: Diptera
- Family: Psilidae
- Subfamily: Psilinae
- Genus: Loxocera; Meigen, 1803

Type species
- Musca ichneumonea Linnaeus, 1758

Synonyms
- Asiopsila Shatalkin, 1998; Asioptila Shatalkin, 1998; Imantimyia Frey, 1925; Lexocera Griffith & Pidgeon 1832

= Loxocera =

Genus of flies

Loxocera is a genus of flies and member of the family Psilidae.

Loxocera species

== Species ==
Species within this genus include:

- L. achaeta Shatalkin, 1989
- L. africana Hennig, 1940
- L. albiseta (Schrank, 1803)
- L. algerica Villeneuve, 1913
- L. aristata (Panzer, 1801)
- L. atriceps Bigot, 1886
- L. bifida Verbeke, 1968
- L. brevibuccata Shatalkin, 1998
- L. brevipila Verbeke, 1952
- L. brunneifrons Verbeke, 1952
- L. burmanica Frey, 1955
- L. chinensis Iwasa, 1996
- L. collaris Loew, 1870
- L. cylindrica Say, 1823
- L. decorata Meijere, 1914
- L. derivata Shatalkin, 1998
- L. dispar Bezzi, 1908
- L. femoralis Verbeke, 1952
- L. formosana Hennig, 1940
- L. freidbergi Shatalkin, 1998
- L. fulviventris Meigen, 1826
- L. fumipennis Coquillett, 1901
- L. ghesquierei Verbeke, 1963
- L. ghesquieri Verbeke, 1963
- L. glabra Verbeke, 1956
- L. glandicula Iwasa, 1993
- L. hoffmannseggi Meigen, 1826
- L. humeralis Meijere, 1916
- L. ichneumonea (Linnaeus, 1758)
- L. ignyodactyla Buck, 2006
- L. insolita Iwasa, 1996
- L. kambaitiensis Frey, 1955
- L. laevis Verbeke, 1952
- L. lateralis Loew, 1874
- L. limpida Shatalkin, 1998
- L. lutulenta Iwasa, 1992
- L. macrogramma Speiser, 1910
- L. maculipennis Hendel, 1913
- L. malaisei (Frey, 1955)
- L. manifestaria Iwasa, 1993
- L. matsumurai Iwasa, 1992
- L. michelseni Shatalkin, 1998
- L. microps Melander, 1920
- L. monstrata Iwasa, 1992
- L. nervosa Verbeke, 1952
- L. nigrifrons Macquart, 1835
- L. ojibwayensis Buck, 2006
- L. omei Shatalkin, 1998
- L. perstriata Verbeke, 1952
- L. pilipleura Verbeke, 1963
- L. pisaeus (Rossi, 1794)
- L. pleuralis Frey, 1928
- L. primigena Shatalkin, 1998
- L. rufa Loew, 1874
- L. seyrigi Verbeke, 1956
- L. sylvatica Meigen, 1826
- L. vittipleura Shatalkin, 1998
