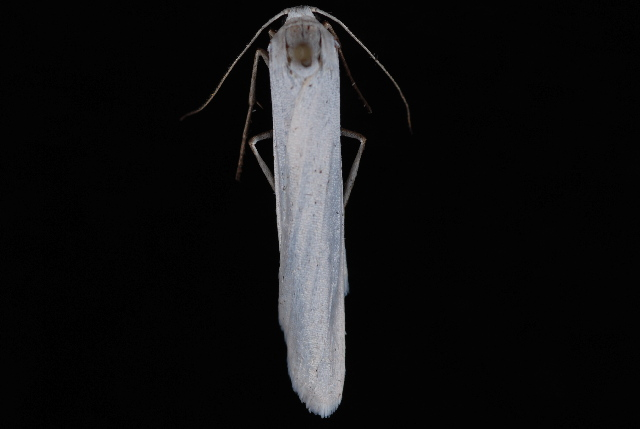
- Crambidia casta

Scientific classification
- Kingdom: Animalia
- Phylum: Arthropoda
- Clade: Pancrustacea
- Class: Insecta
- Order: Lepidoptera
- Superfamily: Noctuoidea
- Family: Erebidae
- Subfamily: Arctiinae
- Subtribe: Lithosiina
- Genus: Crambidia; Packard, 1864

= Crambidia =

Genus of moths

Crambidia is a genus of moths in the family Erebidae. The genus was described by Packard in 1864.

== Species ==
- Crambidia casta (Packard, 1869)
- Crambidia cephalica (Grote & Robinson, 1870)
- Crambidia cinnica Schaus, 1924
- Crambidia dusca Barnes & McDunnough, 1913
- Crambidia impura Barnes & McDunnough, 1913
- Crambidia lithosioides Dyar, 1898
- Crambidia myrlosea Dyar, 1917
- Crambidia pallida Packard, 1864
- Crambidia pura Barnes & McDunnough, 1913
- Crambidia roberto Dyar, 1907
- Crambidia scoteola Hampson, 1900
- Crambidia suffusa Barnes & McDunnough, 1912
- Crambidia uniformis Dyar, 1898
