= Cosmotoma zikani =

Scientific classification
- Kingdom: Animalia
- Phylum: Arthropoda
- Class: Insecta
- Order: Coleoptera
- Suborder: Polyphaga
- Infraorder: Cucujiformia
- Family: Cerambycidae
- Genus: Cosmotoma
- Species: C. zikani

Binomial name
- Cosmotoma zikani Melzer, 1927

Species of beetle

Cosmotoma zikani is a species of longhorn beetles of the subfamily Lamiinae. It was described by Melzer in 1927, and is known from southeastern Brazil.
