= Crambidia suffusa =

Scientific classification
- Domain: Eukaryota
- Kingdom: Animalia
- Phylum: Arthropoda
- Class: Insecta
- Order: Lepidoptera
- Superfamily: Noctuoidea
- Family: Erebidae
- Subfamily: Arctiinae
- Genus: Crambidia
- Species: C. suffusa

Binomial name
- Crambidia suffusa Barnes & McDunnough, 1912

Species of moth

Crambidia suffusa is a moth of the family Erebidae. It was described by William Barnes and James Halliday McDunnough in 1912. It is found in the US state of California.

The wingspan is about 29 mm.
