= Caphys dubia =

Scientific classification
- Domain: Eukaryota
- Kingdom: Animalia
- Phylum: Arthropoda
- Class: Insecta
- Order: Lepidoptera
- Family: Pyralidae
- Genus: Caphys
- Species: C. dubia

Binomial name
- Caphys dubia Warren, 1891

Species of moth

Caphys dubia is a species of snout moth in the genus Caphys. It was described by Warren in 1891, and is known from the West Indies and Brazil.
