= Caphys =

Scientific classification
- Kingdom: Animalia
- Phylum: Arthropoda
- Clade: Pancrustacea
- Class: Insecta
- Order: Lepidoptera
- Family: Pyralidae
- Subfamily: Chrysauginae
- Genus: Caphys; Walker, 1863

Type species
- Caphys bilinea Walker, 1863

Synonyms
- Ugra Walker, 1863; Euexippe Ragonot, 1891

Genus of moths

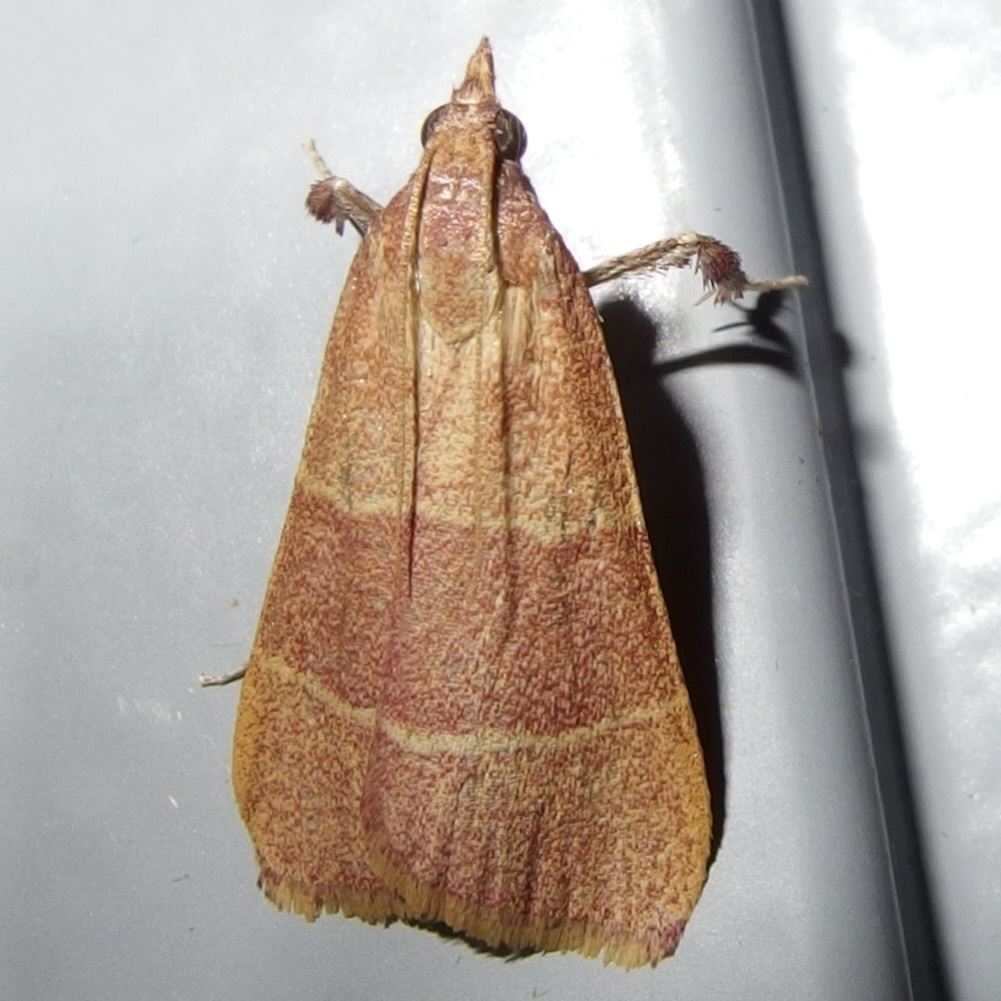
A Caphys arizonensis moth

Caphys is a genus of snout moths. It was described by Francis Walker in 1863, who designated the type species as Caphys bilinea, a junior synonym for Caphys bilineata. Further information on the creature can be done through BugGuide where one can easily identify insects, spiders and species from their kin that habituate across the United States and Canada.

== Species ==
- Caphys arizonensis Munroe, 1970
- Caphys bilineata (Stoll, [1781])
- Caphys dubia Warren, 1891
- Caphys eustelechalis Dyar, 1914
- Caphys fovealis Hampson, 1897
- Caphys pallida Hampson, 1897
- Caphys subrosealis Walker, [1866]
- Caphys subsordidalis Dyar, 1914
