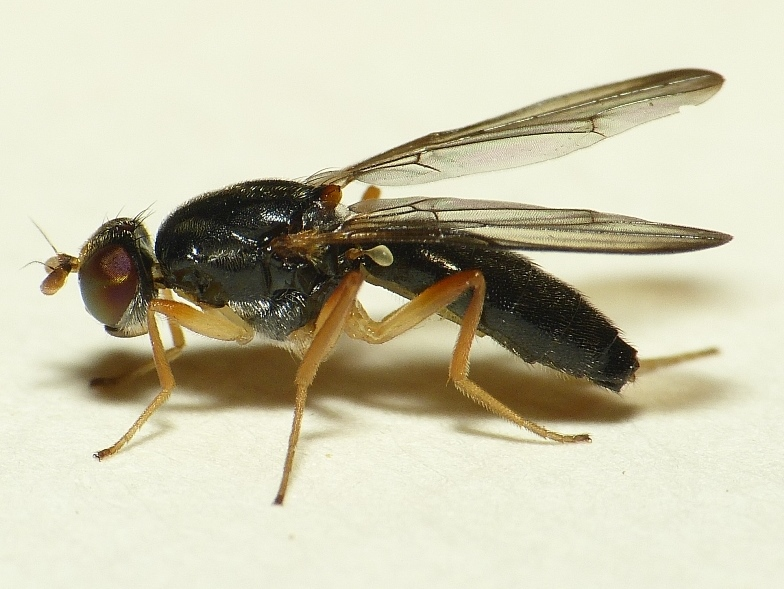
- Chyliza leptogaster

Scientific classification
- Kingdom: Animalia
- Phylum: Arthropoda
- Clade: Pancrustacea
- Class: Insecta
- Order: Diptera
- Family: Psilidae
- Subfamily: Chylizinae
- Genus: Chyliza; Fallén 1820

Species
- See text

= Chyliza =

Genus of insects

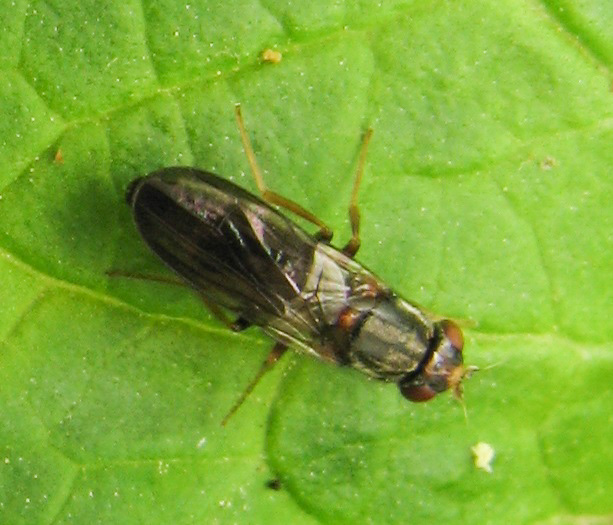
Chyliza sp.

Chyliza is a genus of rust flies (insects in the family Psilidae).

== Species ==
- Chyliza abstrusa
- Chyliza acromelaena
- Chyliza acuta
- Chyliza amaranthi
- Chyliza amnoni
- Chyliza angrensis
- Chyliza angustifrons
- Chyliza annulipes
- Chyliza apicalis
- Chyliza benoiti
- Chyliza bigoti
- Chyliza breviceps
- Chyliza calcaria
- Chyliza calidella
- Chyliza callosa
- Chyliza caudata
- Chyliza chikuni
- Chyliza compedita
- Chyliza connectens
- Chyliza consanguinea
- Chyliza coxachaeta
- Chyliza crinita
- Chyliza crusculata
- Chyliza cryptica
- Chyliza dichaeta
- Chyliza elegans Hendel, 1913
- Chyliza emotoi
- Chyliza enthea
- Chyliza eoa
- Chyliza erudita Melander, 1920
- Chyliza extenuata
- Chyliza flavifrons
- Chyliza fraterna
- Chyliza freyi
- Chyliza fumipennis
- Chyliza fuscicornis
- Chyliza gracilis
- Chyliza hackarsi
- Chyliza himalayana
- Chyliza humeralis
- Chyliza inermipes
- Chyliza ingetiseta
- Chyliza inopinata
- Chyliza javana
- Chyliza kaplanae
- Chyliza kivuensis
- Chyliza kunashirica
- Chyliza lampra
- Chyliza latifrons
- Chyliza leae
- Chyliza leguminicola
- Chyliza leptogaster
- Chyliza limpidipennis
- Chyliza macropyga
- Chyliza maculifrons
- Chyliza maculipleura
- Chyliza melanica
- Chyliza metallica
- Chyliza monika
- Chyliza munda
- Chyliza nakanishii
- Chyliza nartschukiae
- Chyliza nepalensis
- Chyliza nigriapex
- Chyliza nigrifemorata
- Chyliza nigrigenu
- Chyliza nigronitens
- Chyliza nigroviridis
- Chyliza nobilis
- Chyliza notata
- Chyliza nova
- Chyliza nyamuragirae
- Chyliza ocellaris
- Chyliza oreophila
- Chyliza orientalis
- Chyliza overlaeti
- Chyliza palpibasis
- Chyliza panfilovi
- Chyliza pictipennis
- Chyliza prominens
- Chyliza pseudomunda
- Chyliza pumila
- Chyliza pygmaea
- Chyliza richteriae
- Chyliza robusta
- Chyliza rubronigra
- Chyliza rufivertex
- Chyliza rwindiensis
- Chyliza saegeri
- Chyliza sasophila
- Chyliza sauteri
- Chyliza scrobiculata
- Chyliza selecta
- Chyliza selectoides
- Chyliza semiornata
- Chyliza sepsoides
- Chyliza sergii
- Chyliza seseroensis
- Chyliza similis
- Chyliza splendida
- Chyliza stigmatica
- Chyliza straeleni
- Chyliza surcularia
- Chyliza takagii
- Chyliza tenuis
- Chyliza tibialis
- Chyliza trichopoda
- Chyliza trilineata
- Chyliza tristis
- Chyliza uncinula
- Chyliza varipes
- Chyliza vittata
- Chyliza wittei
- Chyliza zangana
- Chyliza zhelochovtsevi
