= Crambidia roberto =

Scientific classification
- Kingdom: Animalia
- Phylum: Arthropoda
- Class: Insecta
- Order: Lepidoptera
- Superfamily: Noctuoidea
- Family: Erebidae
- Subfamily: Arctiinae
- Genus: Crambidia
- Species: C. roberto

Binomial name
- Crambidia roberto Dyar, 1907

Species of moth

Crambidia roberto is a moth of the family Erebidae. It was described by Harrison Gray Dyar Jr. in 1907. It is found in Mexico.
