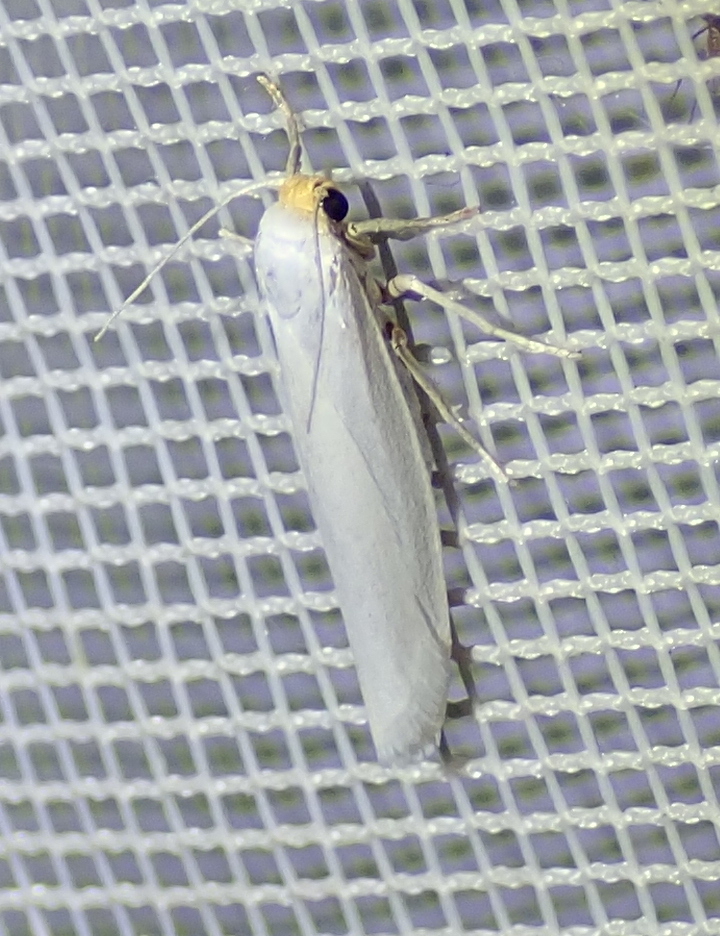
- Crambidia cephalica, Arizona

Scientific classification
- Kingdom: Animalia
- Phylum: Arthropoda
- Class: Insecta
- Order: Lepidoptera
- Superfamily: Noctuoidea
- Family: Erebidae
- Subfamily: Arctiinae
- Genus: Crambidia
- Species: C. cephalica

Binomial name
- Crambidia cephalica (Grote & Robinson, 1870)

Synonyms
- Lithosia cephalica Grote & Robinson, 1870

= Crambidia cephalica =

Species of moth

Crambidia cephalica, the yellow-headed lichen moth, is a moth of the family Erebidae. It was described by Augustus Radcliffe Grote and Coleman Townsend Robinson in 1870. It is found in the central and southern part of the United States, from eastern Nevada, Utah and Arizona to southern Ohio, Tennessee, North Carolina and northern Georgia. The habitat consists of steppes and open forests.

The length of the forewings is 9–15 mm. Adults are on wing from March to September in multiple generations per year.
