= Cosmotoma fasciata =

Scientific classification
- Domain: Eukaryota
- Kingdom: Animalia
- Phylum: Arthropoda
- Class: Insecta
- Order: Coleoptera
- Suborder: Polyphaga
- Infraorder: Cucujiformia
- Family: Cerambycidae
- Genus: Cosmotoma
- Species: C. fasciata

Binomial name
- Cosmotoma fasciata Fisher, 1931

Species of beetle

Cosmotoma fasciata is a species of longhorn beetles of the subfamily Lamiinae. It was described by Fisher in 1931, and is found across Honduras to Panama, and western Ecuador.
