= Caphys eustelechalis =

Scientific classification
- Kingdom: Animalia
- Phylum: Arthropoda
- Class: Insecta
- Order: Lepidoptera
- Family: Pyralidae
- Genus: Caphys
- Species: C. eustelechalis

Binomial name
- Caphys eustelechalis Dyar, 1914

Species of moth

Caphys eustelechalis is a species of snout moth in the genus Caphys. It was described by Harrison Gray Dyar Jr. in 1914, and is known from Panama.
