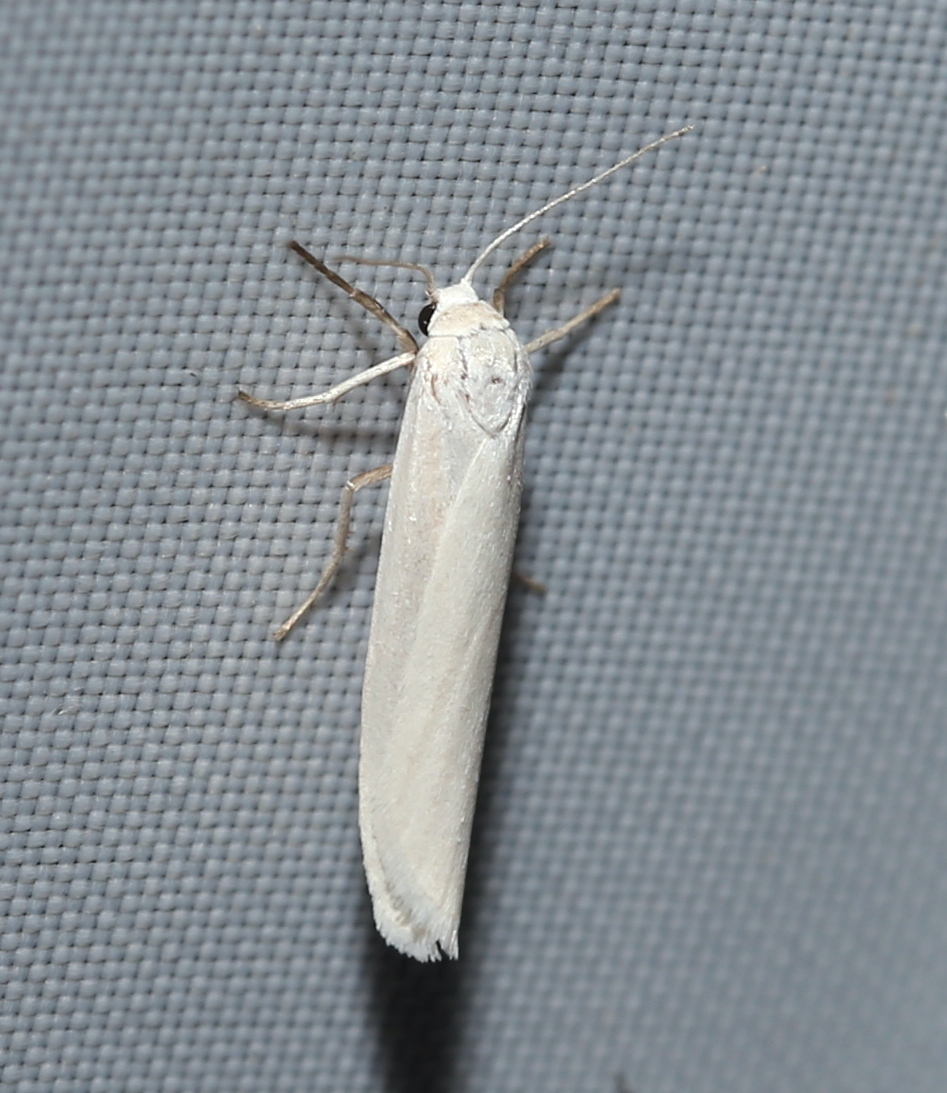

Scientific classification
- Kingdom: Animalia
- Phylum: Arthropoda
- Class: Insecta
- Order: Lepidoptera
- Superfamily: Noctuoidea
- Family: Erebidae
- Subfamily: Arctiinae
- Genus: Crambidia
- Species: C. pura

Binomial name
- Crambidia pura Barnes & McDunnough, 1913

= Crambidia pura =

Pure lichen moth

Species of moth

Crambidia pura, the pure lichen moth, is a moth of the family Erebidae. It was described by William Barnes and James Halliday McDunnough in 1913. It is found in North America, including Arizona, Florida, Georgia, Kentucky, Maryland, Mississippi, New Jersey, North Carolina, Ohio, Ontario, South Carolina, Tennessee, Texas and Wisconsin.

There appear to be two generations per year, one at the end of June, the other in mid-August.

Larvae feed on lichens.
