= Cosmotoma viridana =

Scientific classification
- Domain: Eukaryota
- Kingdom: Animalia
- Phylum: Arthropoda
- Class: Insecta
- Order: Coleoptera
- Suborder: Polyphaga
- Infraorder: Cucujiformia
- Family: Cerambycidae
- Genus: Cosmotoma
- Species: C. viridana

Binomial name
- Cosmotoma viridana Lacordaire, 1872

Species of beetle

Cosmotoma viridana is a species of longhorn beetles of the subfamily Lamiinae. It was described by Lacordaire in 1872, and is known from southeastern Brazil and Paraguay.
