= Cosmotoma =

Scientific classification
- Domain: Eukaryota
- Kingdom: Animalia
- Phylum: Arthropoda
- Class: Insecta
- Order: Coleoptera
- Suborder: Polyphaga
- Infraorder: Cucujiformia
- Family: Cerambycidae
- Tribe: Acanthocinini
- Genus: Cosmotoma

Genus of beetles

Cosmotoma is a genus of beetles in the family Cerambycidae, containing the following species:

- Cosmotoma adjuncta (Thomson, 1860)
- Cosmotoma fasciata Fisher, 1931
- Cosmotoma melzeri Gilmour, 1955
- Cosmotoma nigra Gilmour, 1955
- Cosmotoma olivacea Gilmour, 1955
- Cosmotoma pallida Gilmour, 1955
- Cosmotoma sertifer (Audinet-Serville, 1835)
- Cosmotoma suturalis Gilmour, 1955
- Cosmotoma triangularis Gilmour, 1955
- Cosmotoma viridana Lacordaire, 1872
- Cosmotoma zikani Melzer, 1927
