= Crambidia cinnica =

Scientific classification
- Domain: Eukaryota
- Kingdom: Animalia
- Phylum: Arthropoda
- Class: Insecta
- Order: Lepidoptera
- Superfamily: Noctuoidea
- Family: Erebidae
- Subfamily: Arctiinae
- Genus: Crambidia
- Species: C. cinnica

Binomial name
- Crambidia cinnica Schaus, 1924

Species of moth

Crambidia cinnica is a moth of the family Erebidae. It was described by Schaus in 1924. It is found in Mexico.
