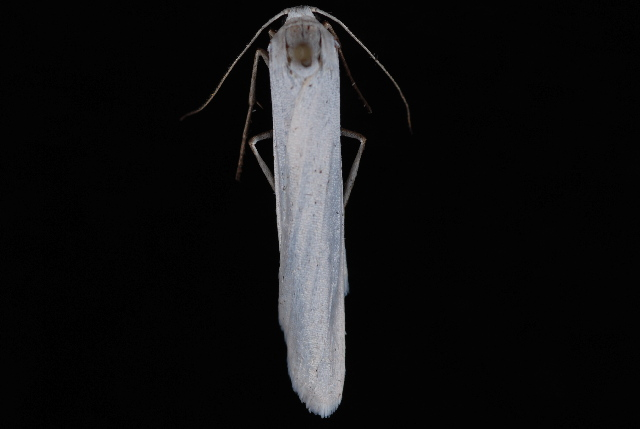

Scientific classification
- Kingdom: Animalia
- Phylum: Arthropoda
- Clade: Pancrustacea
- Class: Insecta
- Order: Lepidoptera
- Superfamily: Noctuoidea
- Family: Erebidae
- Subfamily: Arctiinae
- Genus: Crambidia
- Species: C. casta

Binomial name
- Crambidia casta (Packard, 1869)

Synonyms
- Lithosia casta Packard, 1869; Lithosia candida H. Edwards, 1873

= Crambidia casta =

Pearly-winged lichen moth

Species of moth

Crambidia casta, the pearly-winged lichen moth, is a moth of the family Erebidae. It was described by Packard in 1869. It is found from North Carolina and Kentucky north to Nova Scotia. In the west it occurs from the Rocky Mountain states south to central Arizona and New Mexico. The habitat consists of eastern hardwood forests, juniper woodlands and sagebrush rangelands

The wingspan is about 30 mm.

The larvae feed on lichens.
