= Caphys bilineata =

Scientific classification
- Kingdom: Animalia
- Phylum: Arthropoda
- Clade: Pancrustacea
- Class: Insecta
- Order: Lepidoptera
- Family: Pyralidae
- Genus: Caphys
- Species: C. bilineata

Binomial name
- Caphys bilineata (Stoll, [1781])

Synonyms
- Caphys biliniata; Phalaena bilineata Stoll, [1781]; Caphys bilinea Walker, 1863; Euexippe bistrialis Ragonot, 1891; Ugra parallela Walker, 1863

Species of moth

Caphys bilineata is a species of snout moth. It was described by Caspar Stoll in 1781. It is found in much of Central America and South America, including Arizona, Honduras, Panama, Bahamas, Cuba, Grenada, Guadeloupe, Puerto Rico, Saint Vincent, Brazil, Chile, Colombia, Ecuador, Peru, Suriname and Venezuela.

The larvae have been recorded in the nests of the brown-throated parakeet (Aratinga pertinax), Elaeis oleifera, Elaeis guineensis (Arecaceae), Plinia edulis (Myrtaceae) and Carapa guianensis and Khaya senegalensis (Meliaceae) and seeds of Araucaria angustifolia (Araucariaceae).
