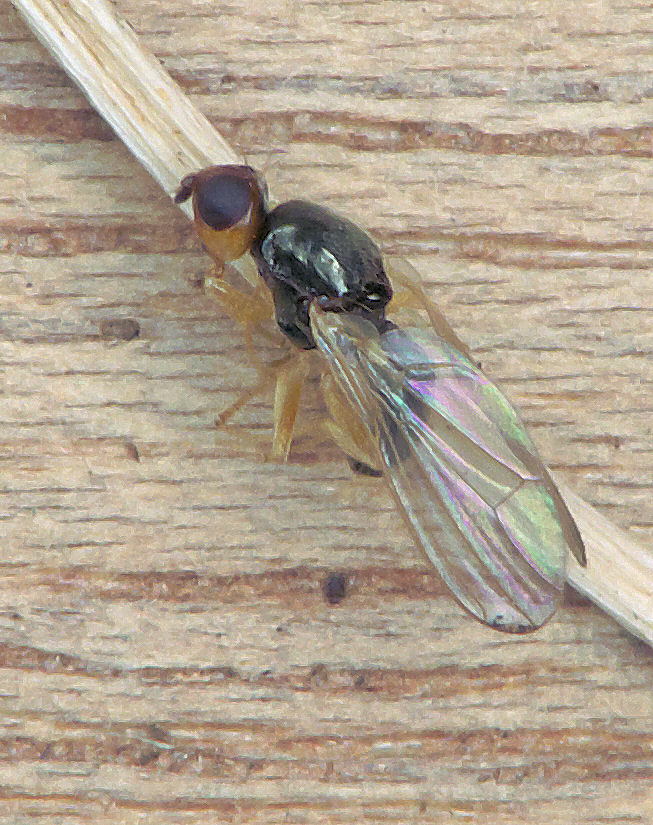
- Chamaepsila rosae the Carrot fly

Scientific classification
- Kingdom: Animalia
- Phylum: Arthropoda
- Clade: Pancrustacea
- Class: Insecta
- Order: Diptera
- Family: Psilidae
- Subfamily: Psilinae
- Genus: Chamaepsila; Hendel, 1917

= Chamaepsila =

Genus of flies

Chamaepsila is a genus of flies in the family Psilidae.

== Species ==
- Subgenus Chamaepsila Hendel, 1917
  - C. atra (Meigen, 1826)
  - C. bicolor (Meigen, 1826)
  - C. buccata (Fallén, 1826)
  - C. clunalis (Collin, 1944)
  - C. humeralis (Zetterstedt, 1847)
  - C. limbatella (Zetterstedt, 1847)
  - C. luteola (Collin, 1944)
  - C. nigra (Fallén, 1820)
  - C. nigricornis (Meigen, 1826)
  - C. pallida (Fallén, 1820)
  - C. persimilis (Wakerley, 1959)
  - C. rosae (Fabricius, 1794)
- Subgenus Tetrapsila Frey, 1925
  - C. obscuritarsis (Loew, 1856)
