= Cymosafia =

Scientific classification
- Kingdom: Animalia
- Phylum: Arthropoda
- Class: Insecta
- Order: Lepidoptera
- Superfamily: Noctuoidea
- Family: Noctuidae (?)
- Subfamily: Catocalinae
- Genus: Cymosafia; Hampson, 1913

Genus of moths

Cymosafia is a genus of moths of the family Noctuidae. The genus was erected by George Hampson in 1913.

== Species ==
- Cymosafia andraei Köhler, 1979 Bolivia
- Cymosafia dolorosa Köhler, 1979 Bolivia
- Cymosafia laba H. Druce, 1890
- Cymosafia pallida Hampson, 1913
- Cymosafia pumilia Köhler, 1979 Bolivia
