= Caphys pallida =

Scientific classification
- Kingdom: Animalia
- Phylum: Arthropoda
- Class: Insecta
- Order: Lepidoptera
- Family: Pyralidae
- Genus: Caphys
- Species: C. pallida

Binomial name
- Caphys pallida Hampson, 1897

Species of moth

Caphys pallida is a species of snout moth in the genus Caphys. It was described by George Hampson in 1897, and is known from Brazil [Sao Paulo)
