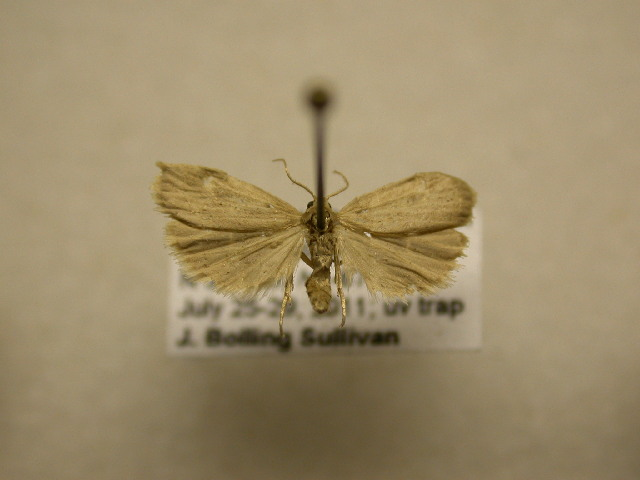

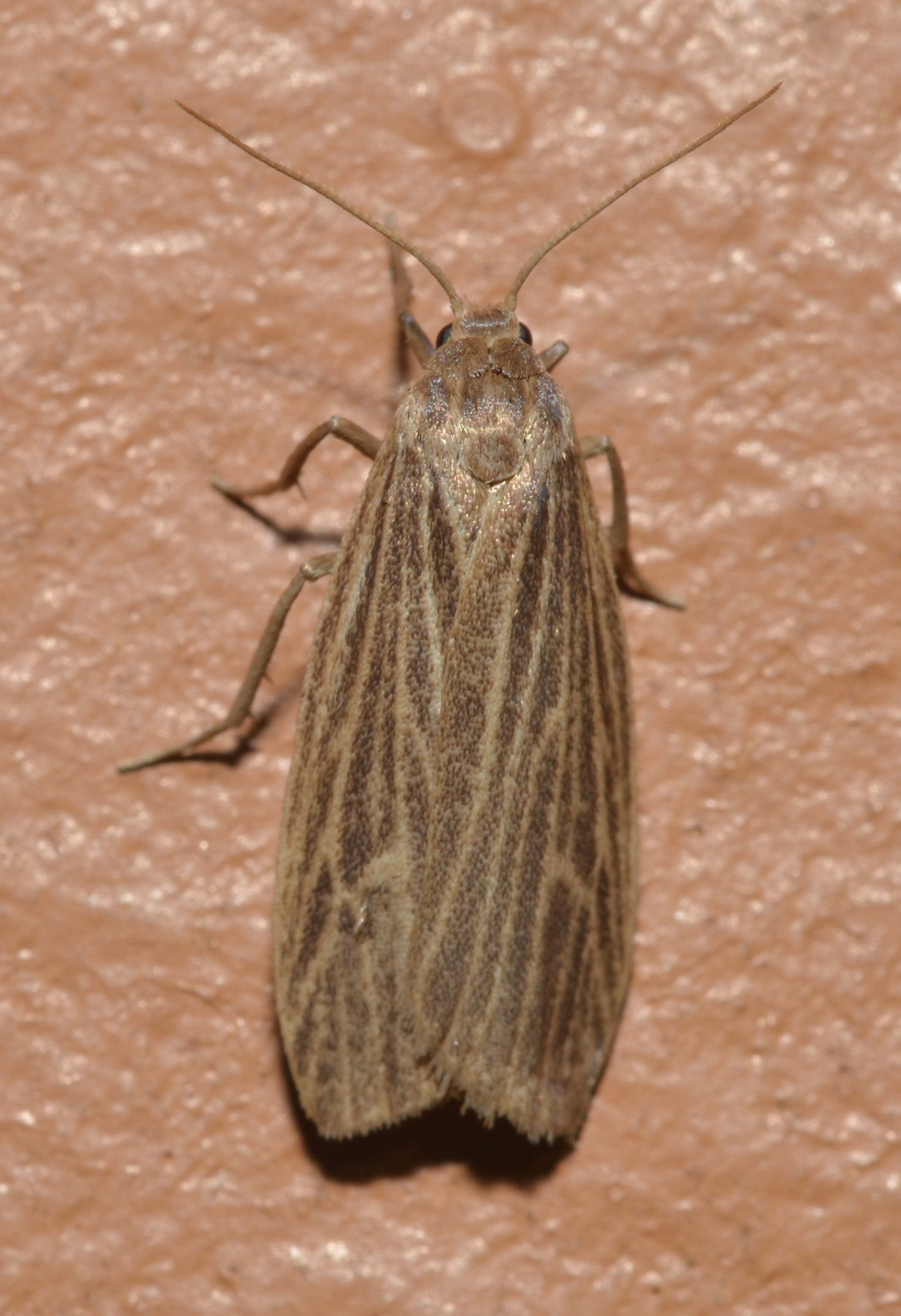

Scientific classification
- Kingdom: Animalia
- Phylum: Arthropoda
- Clade: Pancrustacea
- Class: Insecta
- Order: Lepidoptera
- Superfamily: Noctuoidea
- Family: Erebidae
- Subfamily: Arctiinae
- Genus: Crambidia
- Species: C. pallida

Binomial name
- Crambidia pallida Packard, 1864

= Crambidia pallida =

Species of moth

Crambidia pallida, the pale lichen moth, is a moth of the family Erebidae. It was described by Packard in 1864. It is found from Nova Scotia to Florida, west to Texas and north to North Dakota and Manitoba. The habitat consists of forests and woodlands.
