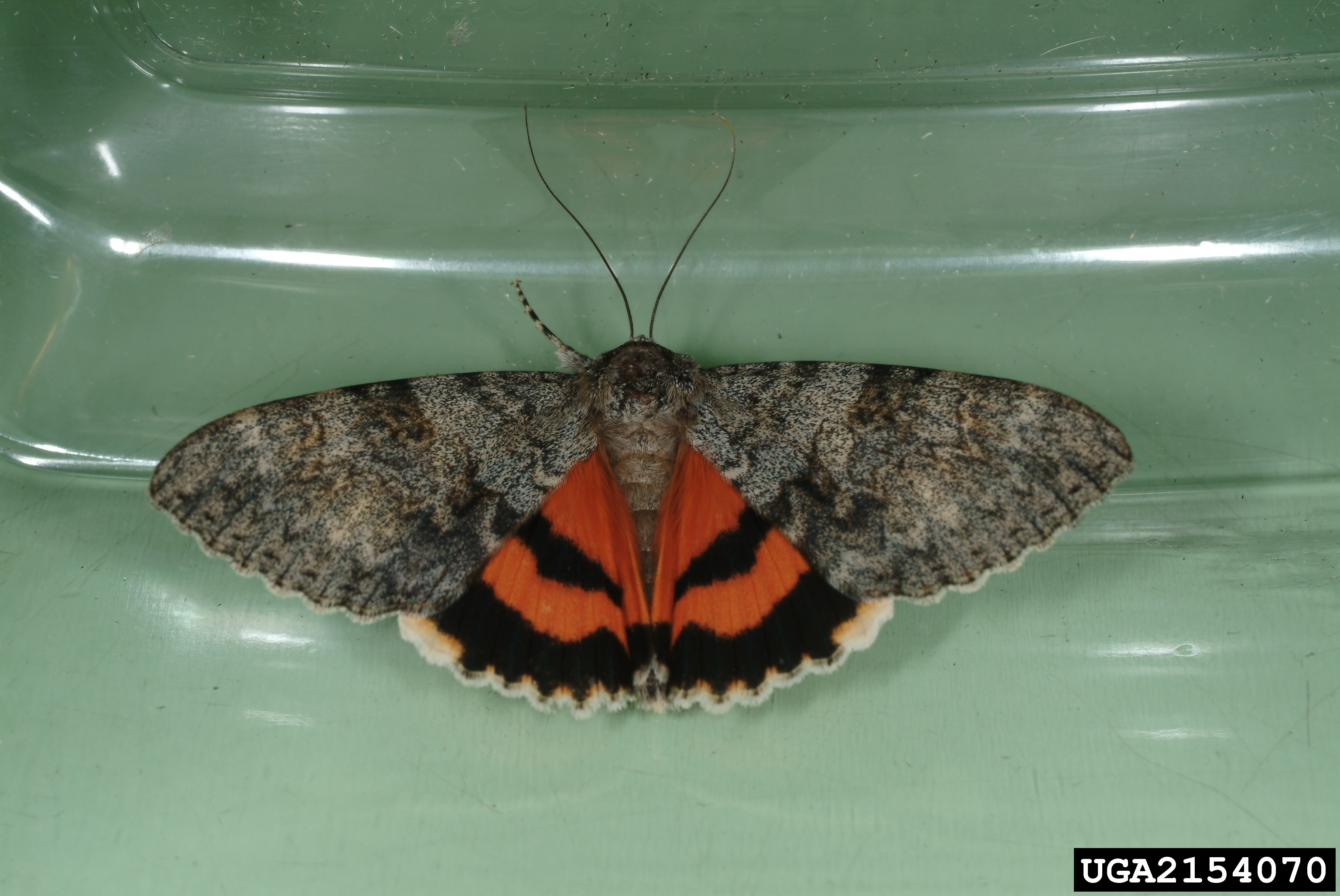

Scientific classification
- Kingdom: Animalia
- Phylum: Arthropoda
- Clade: Pancrustacea
- Class: Insecta
- Order: Lepidoptera
- Superfamily: Noctuoidea
- Family: Erebidae
- Genus: Catocala
- Species: C. amatrix

Binomial name
- Catocala amatrix (Hübner, [1813])

Synonyms
- Noctua amatrix Hübner, [1813]; Catocala nurus Walker, 1858; Catocala selecta Walker, 1858; Catocala editha W.H. Edwards, 1874; Catocala pallida

= Catocala amatrix =

Sweetheart underwing

Species of moth

Catocala amatrix, the sweetheart underwing, is a moth of the family Erebidae. The species can be found from Nova Scotia, south through Connecticut to Florida and west through Texas and Oklahoma to Arizona and north to Montana, Minnesota, and Ontario.

An exhibition model done by the Denton Brothers of Wellesley, Massachusetts was discovered in a consignment shop in Flagler Beach, Florida on September 12, 2013 by Brittany Durocher, a resident of that city. It was collected by the Denton Brothers in Virginia and named Catocala amatrix virginurus.

The wingspan is 75–95 mm. The moths flies from August to October depending on the location.

The larvae feed on Populus deltoides, Populus grandidentata, Populus nigra, Populus tremuloides, and Salix nigra.

== Gallery ==
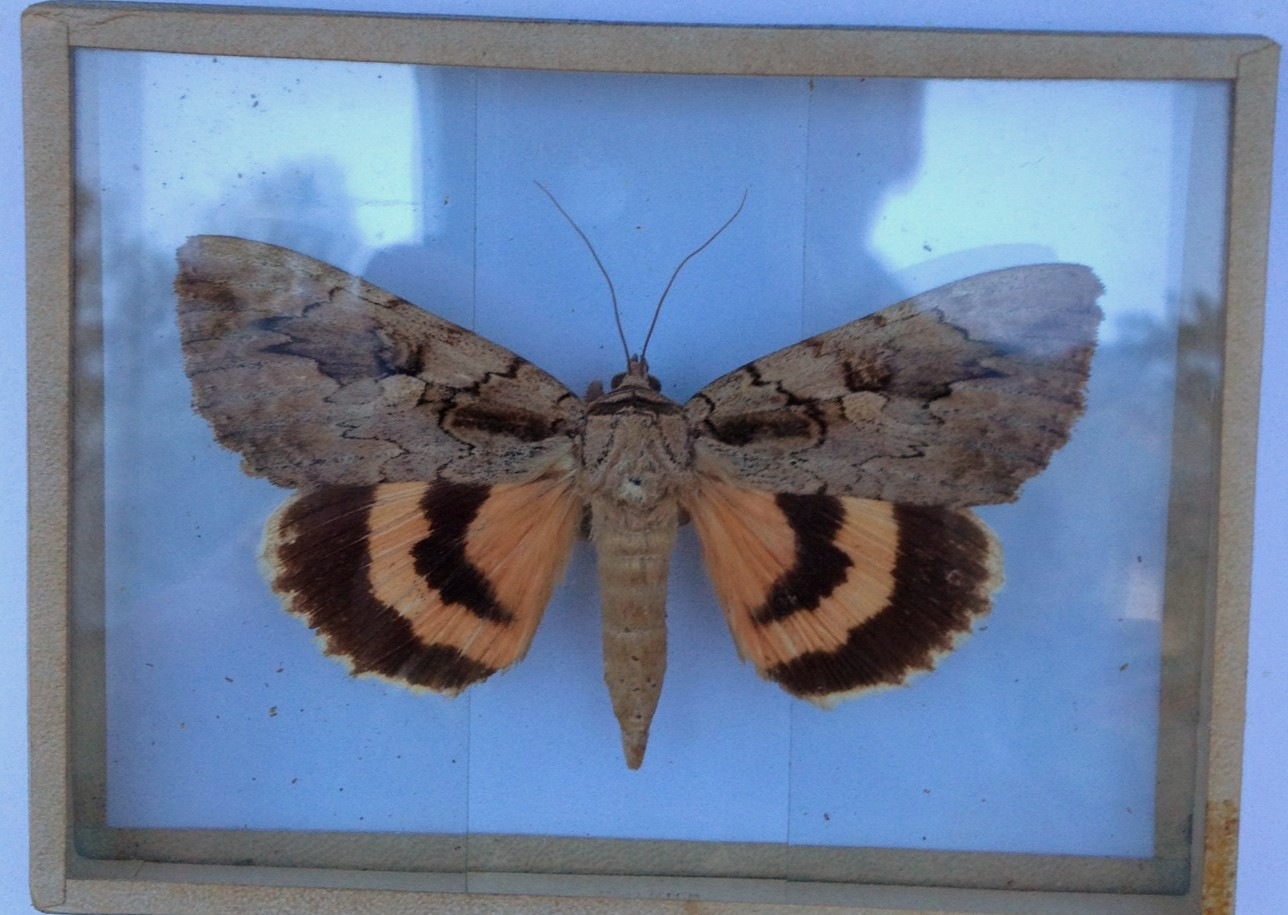
picture of the specimen found by Ms. Durocher

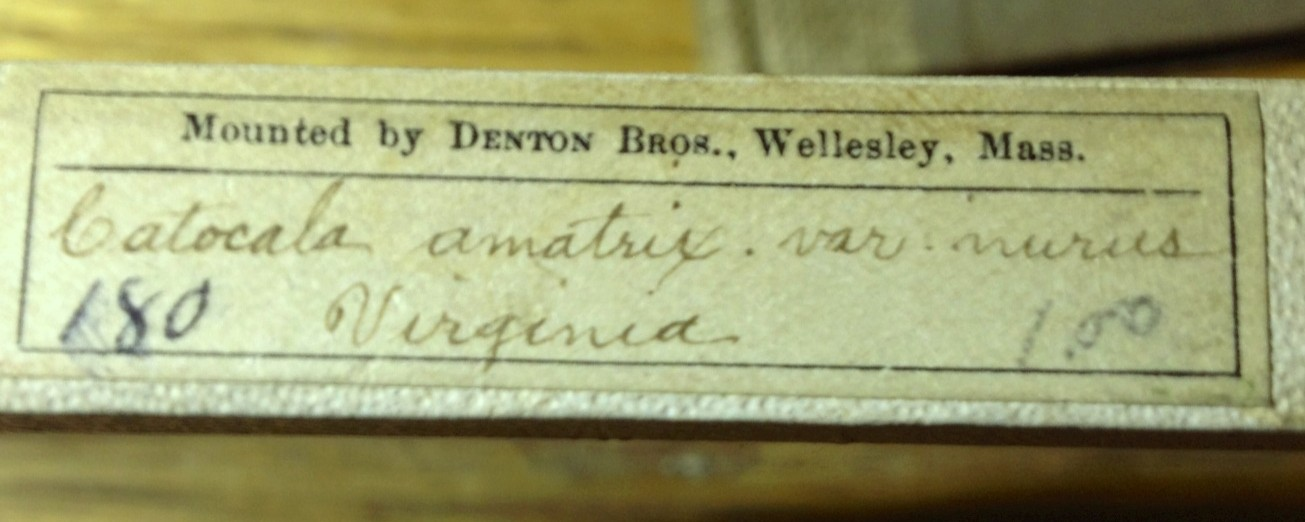
Attribution to the Denton Brothers

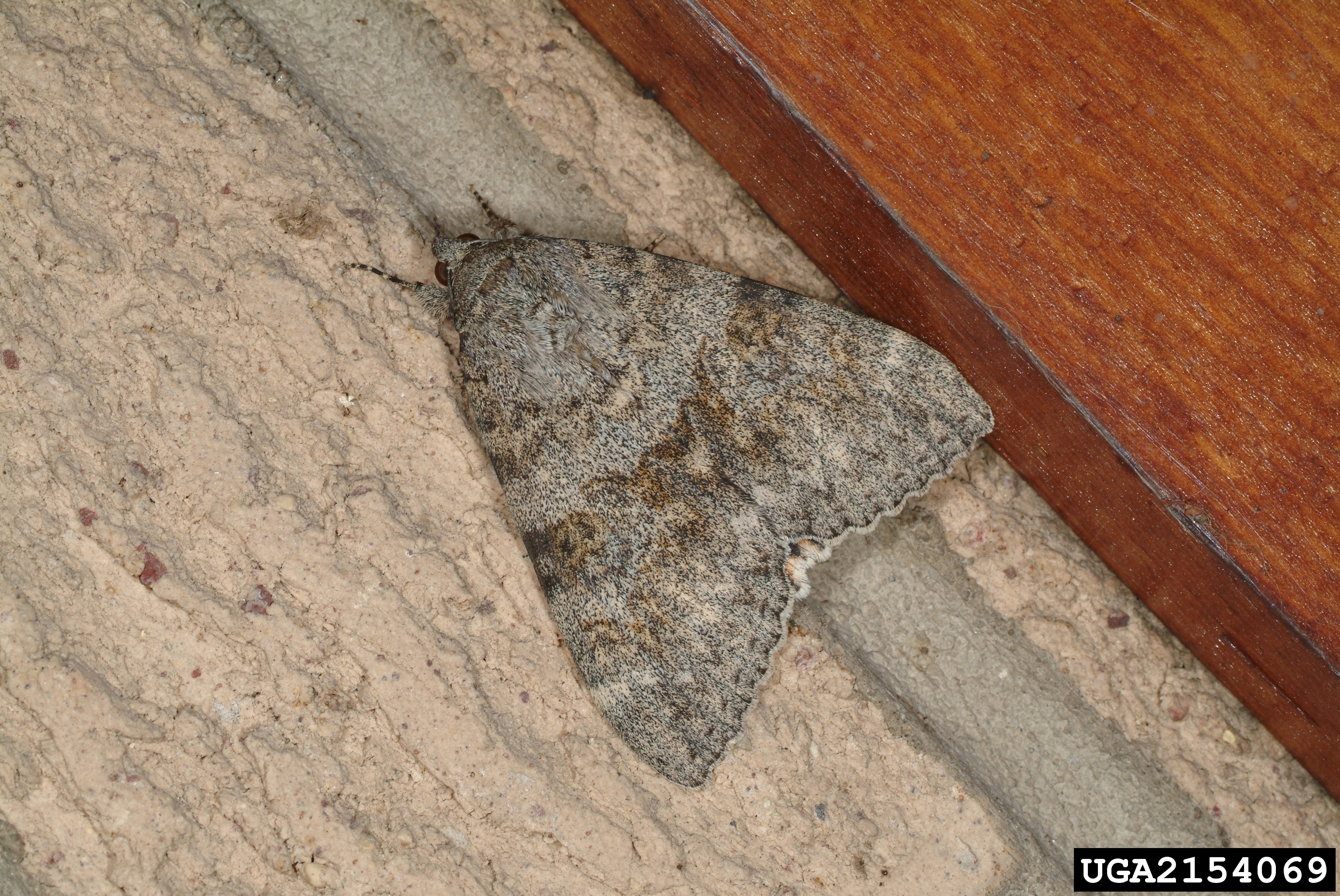

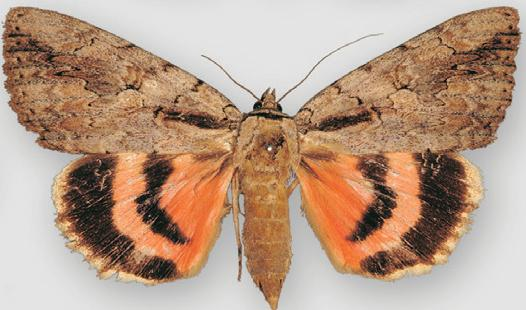
Lectotype of Catocala nurus, now considered to be a synonym of Catocala amatrix
