= Cosmotoma pallida =

Scientific classification
- Domain: Eukaryota
- Kingdom: Animalia
- Phylum: Arthropoda
- Class: Insecta
- Order: Coleoptera
- Suborder: Polyphaga
- Infraorder: Cucujiformia
- Family: Cerambycidae
- Genus: Cosmotoma
- Species: C. pallida

Binomial name
- Cosmotoma pallida Gilmour, 1955

Species of beetle

Cosmotoma pallida is a species of longhorn beetles of the subfamily Lamiinae. It was described by Gilmour in 1955, and is known from southern Brazil.
