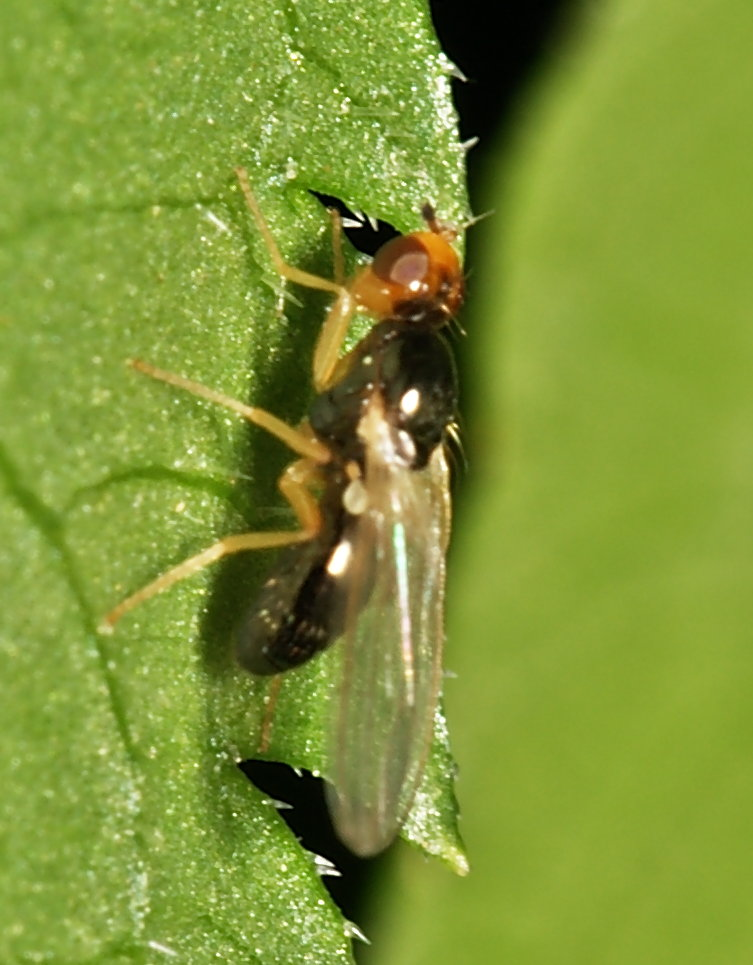
- Chamaepsila sp. from Germany

Scientific classification
- Kingdom: Animalia
- Phylum: Arthropoda
- Clade: Pancrustacea
- Class: Insecta
- Order: Diptera
- (unranked): Cyclorrhapha
- Section: Schizophora
- Superfamily: Diopsoidea
- Family: Psilidae; Macquart, 1835

Subfamily
- Chylizinae; Loxocerinae; Psilinae

= Psilidae =

Family of flies

The Psilidae are family of flies. Commonly called the rust flies, at least 38 species are in four genera. The carrot fly (Chamaepsila rosae) is a member of this group. They are found mainly in the Holarctic.

== Description ==
These are small or medium-sized (1.5 mm.-10 mm.) flies with slender bodies. They are yellow to reddish, brown or black in colour. The head is spherical with (relatively) small eyes and the face is often slanted backward. The antennae are small, with the third antennal segment conspicuously elongated. The arista has a short or long pubescence. The postvertical bristles are divergent or absent. Ocelli and ocellar bristles are present. Vibrissae are always absent. Up to two pairs of frontal bristles and scattered interfrontal setulae are present. The costa is interrupted at some distance from R1 and only the basal part of the subcosta is developed. The vein bordering the anal cell is straight on the outer side. Crossvein BM-Cu is present and the cell cup is closed. The wing is usually clear to slightly tinged, but in some cases along the costa, the wing tip or the cross-veins there are dark bands. The wing has a transverse weakening in the basal half. Tibiae are without a dorsal preapical bristle. See Description and plates from Francis Walker's Insecta Britannica Diptera.

== Biology ==
Psilidae are especially common in cool places on low-density vegetation. This explains why the family is well represented in temperate zones. The larvae are almost exclusively phytophagous on nonwoody plants. They live either in stems, tubers, or roots. A few species live under tree bark. Some form galls. Several species are pests in agriculture and horticulture. Chamaepsila rosae Fabricius, and Psila nigricornis Meigen are instances.

== List of genera ==
Loxocera sp. in a marshy meadow

- Belobackenbardia
- Chamaepsila
- Chyliza
- Loxocera
- Loxocerosoma
- Oxypsila
- Phytopsila
- Psila
- Psilosoma
- Schizostomyia
- Synaphopsila
- Tropeopsila
