= List of Lepidoptera of Massachusetts =

The following is a list of Lepidoptera present in the U.S. state of Massachusetts. There are over 200 different species of moths in the state, but due to similarities many are often mistaken for other species.

== List criteria and legend ==
Criteria

- Photography – The list below does not cite vernacular photography, all photography sourcing must be verified by and/or taken by an expert in the field.
- Range – The list below generally excludes vagrancy, Lepidoptera that are native or have been introduced to the state are preferred. Photos alone can not establish a range unless specifically stated.

Legend

- Endangered species (state level)

== Moths ==
Image	Scientific name	Common name(s)	Genus	Family (Note: Subfamilies are not included)	Described
	Abagrotis alternata	Greater red dart Mottled gray cutworm	Abagrotis	Noctuidae	1865
—N/a	Abagrotis brunneipennis	Yankee dart	Abagrotis	Noctuidae	1875
—N/a	Abagrotis magnicupida	One-dotted dart	Abagrotis	Noctuidae	1998
—N/a	Abagrotis nefascia (Status: Special concern)	Coastal heathland cutworm	Abagrotis	Noctuidae	1908
	Achatia distincta	Distinct Quaker	Achatia	Noctuidae	1813
	Acleris semipurpurana	Oak leaftier Oak leaf tier	Acleris	Tortricidae	1909
—N/a	Acleris variana	Eastern blackheaded budworm	Acleris	Tortricidae	1886
	Acronicta afflicta	Afflicted dagger moth	Acronicta	Noctuidae	1864
	Acronicta albarufa (Status: Threatened)	Barrens dagger moth	Acronicta	Noctuidae	1874
	Acronicta haesitata	Hesitant dagger moth	Acronicta	Noctuidae	1882
	Acronicta hasta	Forked dagger moth Speared dagger moth Cherry dagger moth Dart dagger moth	Acronicta	Noctuidae	1852
	Acronicta inclara	Unclear dagger moth	Acronicta	Noctuidae	1900
	Acronicta increta	Raspberry bud dagger moth Raspberry bud moth Peach sword stripe night moth	Acronicta	Noctuidae	1875
	Acronicta lithospila	Streaked dagger moth	Acronicta	Noctuidae	1874
	Acronicta modica	Medium dagger moth	Acronicta	Noctuidae	1856
	Aethalura intertexta	Four-barred gray	Aethalura	Geometridae	1860
—N/a	Aethes spartinana	—N/a	Aethes	Tortricidae	1916
	Agrotis ipsilon	Dark sword-grass Black cutworm Greasy cutworm Floodplain cutworm Ipsilon dart	Agrotis	Noctuidae	1766
	Alsophila pometaria	Fall cankerworm	Alsophila	Geometridae	1841
	Anavitrinella pampinaria	Common gray	Anavitrinella	Geometridae	1857
	Anisota stigma (Status: Rare)	Spiny oakworm moth	Anisota	Saturniidae	1775
	Antepione thisoaria	Variable antepione	Antepione	Geometridae	1857
—N/a	Apamea inebriata (Status: Special concern)	Drunk apamea moth	Apamea	Noctuidae	1977
	Apamea sordens	Rustic shoulder-knot Bordered apamea	Apamea	Noctuidae	1766
—N/a	Apodrepanulatrix liberaria (Status: Endangered)	New Jersey tea inchworm	Apodrepanulatrix	Geometridae	1860
	Apantesis nais	Nais tiger moth	Apantesis	Erebidae	1773
	Arta statalis	Posturing arta moth	Arta	Pyralidae	1875
	Athetis tarda	Slowpoke moth	Athetis	Noctuidae	1852
—N/a	Autographa precationis	Common looper moth	Autographa	Noctuidae	1852
	Baileya ophthalmica	Eyed baileya	Baileya	Nolidae	1852
—N/a	Besma endropiaria	Straw besma	Besma	Geometridae	1867
	Besma quercivoraria	Oak besma	Besma	Geometridae	1857
	Bleptina caradrinalis	Bent-winged owlet Variable snout moth	Bleptina	Erebidae	1852
—N/a	Cabnia myronella	—N/a	Cabnia (Note: Sole species of this genus)	Pyralidae	1904
	Callopistria cordata	Silver-spotted fern moth	Callopistria	Noctuidae	1825
	Callopistria mollissima	Pink-shaded fern moth	Callopistria	Noctuidae	1852
	Caripeta piniata	Northern pine looper	Caripeta	Geometridae	1870
	Catocala angusi (Status: Rare)	'Angus' underwing	Catocala	Erebidae	1876 (Note: First recorded in Massachusetts in the mid-1920s)
	Catocala crataegi	Hawthorn underwing Chokeberry underwing	Catocala	Erebidae	1876
	Catocala dejecta (Status: Rare)	Dejected underwing	Catocala	Erebidae	1880
	Catocala flebilis (Status: Possibly rare)	Mourning underwing	Catocala	Erebidae	1872
	Catocala herodias (Status: Special concern)	Herodias underwing Gerhard's underwing	Catocala	Erebidae	1876
	Catocala lacrymosa (Status: Rare)	Tearful underwing	Catocala	Erebidae	1852
	Catocala miranda (Status: Rare)	Miranda underwing	Catocala	Erebidae	1881
	Catocala obscura	Obscure underwing	Catocala	Erebidae	1873
—N/a	Catocala pretiosa (Status: Endangered)	Precious underwing	Catocala	Erebidae	1876
	Catocala serena	Serene underwing	Catocala	Erebidae	1864
—N/a	Chaetaglaea cerata (Status: Special concern)	Waxed sallow	Chaetaglaea	Noctuidae	1943
	Chloroclystis rectangulata	Green pug	Pasiphila	Geometridae	1758
	Chytolita morbidalis	Morbid owlet moth Morbid owlet	Chytolita	Erebidae	1854
	Chytonix palliatricula	Cloaked marvel moth	Chytonix	Noctuidae	1852
—N/a	Cicinnus melsheimeri (Status: Threatened)	Melsheimer's sack bearer	Cicinnus	Mimallonidae	1841
—N/a	Cingilia catenaria (Status: Special concern)	Chain-dotted geometer Chain dot geometer Chainspotted geometer Chain-spotted geometer	Cingilia	Geometridae	1773
	Cisthene packardii	Packard's lichen moth	Cisthene	Erebidae	1863
	Cladara limitaria	Mottled gray carpet moth	Cladara	Geometridae	1860
—N/a	Coleophora astericola	—N/a	Coleophora	Coleophoridae	1920
	Colocasia propinquilinea	Closebanded yellowhorn	Colocasia	Noctuidae	1873
	Condica vecors	Dusky groundling	Condica	Noctuidae	1852
	Cosmia calami	American dun-bar moth	Cosmia (Note: The reference given uses the name "Calymnia")	Noctuidae	1876
—N/a	Crocigrapha normani	—N/a	Crocigrapha	Noctuidae	1874
	Cyclophora pendulinaria	Sweetfern geometer moth Pearly-grey wave	Cyclophora	Geometridae	1857
	Cycnia inopinatus (Status: Threatened)	Unexpected cycnia	Cycnia	Erebidae	1882
	Cycnia oregonensis	—N/a	Cycnia	Erebidae	1873
	Darapsa pholus	Azalea sphinx	Darapsa	Sphingidae	1779
	Dargida rubripennis (Status: Threatened)	The pink streak	Dargida	Noctuidae	1870
	Deidamia inscriptum	Lettered sphinx	Deidamia	Sphingidae	1839
	Dolba hyloeus	Pawpaw sphinx	Dolba	Sphingidae	1773
—N/a	Drasteria grandirena	Figure-seven moth Great kidney	Drasteria	Erebidae	1809
	Drepana arcuata	Arched hooktip Masked birch caterpillar	Drepana	Drepanidae	1855
	Eacles imperialis (Status: Threatened)	Imperial moth	Eacles	Saturniidae	1773
—N/a	Egira alternans	Alternate woodling	Egira	Noctuidae	1857
	Elaphria festivoides	Festive midget	Elaphria	Noctuidae	1852
	Elaphria versicolor	Variegated midget	Elaphria	Noctuidae	1875
—N/a	Euchlaena irraria	Least-marked euchlaena	Euchlaena	Geometridae	1916
	Euchlaena madusaria (Status: Special concern)	Scrub euchlaena moth	Euchlaena	Geometridae	1860
	Eufidonia convergaria	Pine powder moth Converged powder moth	Eufidonia	Geometridae	1860
—N/a	Eufidonia notataria	Powder moth	Eufidonia	Geometridae	1860
—N/a	Eulithis explanata	White eulithis	Eulithis	Geometridae	1862
—N/a	Euplexia benesimilis	American angle shades	Euplexia	Noctuidae	1922
	Eutrapela clemetaria	Curve-toothed geometer moth Purplish-brown looper	Eutrapela	Geometridae	1797
—N/a	Feltia manifesta	—N/a	Feltia	Noctuidae	1875
	Apantesis figurata	Figured tiger moth	Apantesis	Erebidae	1773
	Apantesis phyllira (Status: Endangered)	Phyllira tiger moth	Apantesis	Erebidae	1773
	Heliomata cycladata	Common spring moth	Heliomata	Geometridae	1866
	Hemaris diffinis	Snowberry clearwing	Hemaris	Sphingidae	1836
	Hemaris gracilis (Status: Special concern)	Slender clearwing Graceful clearwing	Hemaris	Sphingidae	1865
	Hemaris thysbe	Hummingbird clearwing	Hemaris	Sphingidae	1775
	Hemileuca maia (Status: Special concern)	Buck moth	Hemileuca	Saturniidae	1773
	Heterocampa guttivitta	Saddled prominent moth	Heterocampa	Notodontidae	1855
	Heterocampa umbrata	White-blotched heterocampa	Heterocampa	Notodontidae	1855
—N/a	Heterocampa varia (Status: Threatened)	Sandplain heterocampa Alpine mouse-ear White-marked heterocampa	Heterocampa	Notodontidae	1855
	Homorthodes lindseyi	Southern scurfy Quaker moth	Homorthodes	Noctuidae	1922
	Hypagyrtis esther	Esther moth	Hypagyrtis	Geometridae	1928
	Hypagyrtis unipunctata	One-spotted variant White spot	Hypagyrtis	Geometridae	1809
—N/a	Hypenodes fractilinea	Broken-line hypenodes	Hypenodes	Erebidae	1908
	Hyperaeschra georgica	Georgian prominent	Hyperaeschra	Notodontidae	1855
—N/a	Hyperstrotia villificans	White-lined graylet moth	Hyperstrotia	Erebidae	1918
	Hyphantria cunea	Fall webworm	Hyphantria	Erebidae	1773
—N/a	Hypomecis buchholzaria (Status: Endangered)	Blue spiderwort moth Buchholz's gray	Hypomecis	Geometridae	1937
—N/a	Hyppa xylinoides	Common hyppa Cranberry cutworm	Hyppa	Noctuidae	1852
	Idia aemula	Common idia Powdered snout Waved tabby	Idia	Erebidae	1813
	Idia americalis	American idia American snout	Idia	Erebidae	1854
—N/a	Idia julia	Julia’s Idia	Idia	Erebidae	1894
	Idia rotundalis	Chocolate idia	Idia	Erebidae	1866
—N/a	Iridopsis vellivolata	Large purplish gray	Iridopsis	Geometridae	1881
	Itame pustularia	Lesser maple spanworm	Speranza	Geometridae	1857
—N/a	Lacinipolia anguina	Snaky arches	Lacinipolia	Noctuidae	1881
	Lacinipolia renigera	Kidney-spotted minor Bristly cutworm	Lacinipolia	Noctuidae	1829
	Ledaea perditalis	Buttonbush owlet	Ledaea	Erebidae	1859
—N/a	Leucania linita	Linen wainscot moth	Leucania	Noctuidae	1852
	Leucania ursula	Ursula wainscot	Leucania	Noctuidae	1936
—N/a	Lithophane viridipallens (Status: Special concern)	Pale green pinion moth	Lithophane	Noctuidae	1877
	Lomographa vestaliata	White spring moth	Lomographa	Geometridae	1857
—N/a	Lycia rachelae (Status: Endangered)	Twilight moth	Lycia	Geometridae	1896
	Lycia ypsilon (Status: Threatened)	Woolly gray	Lycia	Geometridae	1885
	Lymantria dispar dispar	Gypsy moth	Lymantria	Erebidae	1758 (Note: First found in Massachusetts in 1869)
—N/a	Macaria bisignata	Redheaded inchworm	Macaria	Geometridae	1866
—N/a	Macaria granitata	Granite moth	Macaria	Geometridae	1857
	Macaria minorata	Minor angle moth	Macaria	Geometridae	1873
—N/a	Macaria pinistrobata	White pine angle	Macaria	Geometridae	1972
	Macaria transitaria	Blurry chocolate angle	Macaria	Geometridae	1861
	Macrurocampa marthesia	Mottled prominent	Macrurocampa	Notodontidae	1780
	Malacosoma americanum	Eastern tent caterpillar	Malacosoma	Lasiocampidae	1793
	Meganola minuscula	Confused meganola	Meganola	Nolidae	1872
—N/a	Metarranthis apiciaria (Status: Endangered)	Barrens metarranthis	Metarranthis	Geometridae	1876
	Metarranthis obfirmaria	Yellow-washed metarranthis	Metarranthis	Geometridae	1823
—N/a	Metarranthis pilosaria (Status: Special concern)	Coastal bog metarranthi Slender groundsel moth	Metarranthis	Geometridae	1876
	Morrisonia confusa	Confused woodgrain	Morrisonia	Noctuidae	1831
	Morrisonia latex	Fluid arches	Morrisonia	Noctuidae	1852
	Nadata gibbosa	Rough prominent White-dotted prominent Tawny prominent	Nadata	Notodontidae	1797
	Nemoria bistriaria	Red-fringed emerald Two-striped emerald	Nemoria	Geometridae	1818
—N/a	Neoligia semicana (Status: Special concern)	Northern brocade moth	Neoligia	Noctuidae	1865
	Noctua pronuba	Large yellow underwing	Noctua	Noctuidae	1758
	Nola clethrae	Sweet pepperbush nola moth	Nola	Nolidae	1899
	Nola pustulata	Sharp-blotched nola	Nola	Nolidae	1865
	Oligia strigilis	Marbled minor	Oligia	Noctuidae	1758
	Operophtera brumata	Winter moth	Operophtera	Geometridae	1758
—N/a	Orthodes cynica	Cynical Quaker	Orthodes	Noctuidae	1852
—N/a	Orthodes detracta	Disparaged arches	Orthodes	Noctuidae	1857
	Paleacrita vernata	Spring cankerworm	Paleacrita	Geometridae	1795
	Palthis angulalis	Dark-spotted palthis	Palthis	Erebidae	1796
	Pangrapta decoralis	Decorated owlet	Pangrapta	Erebidae	1818
	Panopoda rufimargo	Red-lined panopoda	Panopoda	Erebidae	1818
—N/a	Papaipema appassionata (Status: Threatened)	Pitcher plant borer	Papaipema	Noctuidae	1876
—N/a	Papaipema sp. 2 near pterisii (Status: Special concern)	Ostrich fern borer (Note: Not formally described in published scientific literature.)	Papaipema	Noctuidae	Unknown
—N/a	Papaipema stenocelis (Status: Threatened)	Chain fern borer	Papaipema	Noctuidae	1907
—N/a	Papaipema sulphurata (Status: Threatened)	Water-willow stem borer	Papaipema	Noctuidae	1926
	Peridea angulosa	Angulose prominent	Peridea	Notodontidae	1797
	Pero ancetaria	Hübner's pero	Pero	Geometridae	1806
—N/a	Petrophora subaequaria	Northern petrophora	Petrophora	Geometridae	1860
	Phaeoura quernaria	Oak beauty	Phaeoura	Geometridae	1797
	Phalaenostola larentioides	Black-banded owlet	Phalaenostola	Erebidae	1873
—N/a	Photedes inops (Status: Special concern)	Spartina borer moth	Photedes	Noctuidae	1881
	Plagodis alcoolaria	Hollow-spotted plagodis	Plagodis	Geometridae	1857
—N/a	Probole alienaria	Alien probole	Probole	Geometridae	1855
	Protitame virginalis	Virgin moth	Protitame	Geometridae	1900
—N/a	Protoboarmia porcelaria	Porcelain gray Dash-lined looper	Protoboarmia	Geometridae	1857
	Protorthodes oviduca	Ruddy Quaker moth	Protorthodes	Noctuidae	1852
—N/a	Psectraglaea carnosa (Status: Special concern)	Pink sallow	Psectraglaea	Noctuidae	1877
	Ptichodis bistrigata (Status: Threatened)	Southern ptichodis moth	Ptichodis	Erebidae	1818
	Raphia frater	—N/a	Raphia	Noctuidae	1864
	Rhodoecia aurantiago (Status: Special concern)	Orange sallow moth Aureolaria seed borer	Rhodoecia	Noctuidae	1852
	Schizura unicornis	Unicorn caterpillar moth Unicorn prominent Variegated prominent	Schizura	Notodontidae	1797
—N/a	Spargaloma sexpunctata	Six-spotted gray	Spargaloma	Erebidae	1873
—N/a	Speranza argillacearia	Mousy angle moth	Speranza	Geometridae	1874
—N/a	Speranza exonerata (Status: Special concern)	Barrens itame	Speranza	Geometridae	2008
	Spilosoma congrua	Agreeable tiger moth	Spilosoma	Erebidae	1855
—N/a	Spilosoma virginica	Virginia tiger moth (Note: Also known as the "yellow woolly bear" or "yellow bear" caterpillar before adulthood)	Spilosoma	Erebidae	1798
—N/a	Spiramater lutra	Otter spiramater	Spiramater	Noctuidae	1852
—N/a	Stenoporpia polygrammaria (Status: Threatened)	Faded gray Faded gray geometer	Stenoporpia	Geometridae	1876
—N/a	Sympistis riparia (Status: Special concern)	Dune sympistis	Sympistis	Noctuidae	Unknown
	Tetanolita mynesalis	Smoky tetanolita	Tetanolita	Erebidae	1859
	Tetracis cachexiata	White slant-line White slaut	Tetracis	Geometridae	1858
	Ulolonche culea	Sheathed Quaker	Ulolonche	Noctuidae	1852
—N/a	Ulolonche modesta	Modest Quaker	Ulolonche	Noctuidae	1874
	Virbia opella	Tawny holomelina	Virbia	Erebidae	1863
—N/a	Zale helata	Brown-spotted zale	Zale	Noctuidae	1943
	Zale lunifera (Status: Special concern)	Bold-based zale Pine barrens zale	Zale	Noctuidae	1818
—N/a	Zale metatoides	Washed-out zale Jack pine false looper	Zale	Noctuidae	1943
	Zale minerea	Colorful zale Large false looper Mahogany similar-wing	Zale	Erebidae	1852
—N/a	Zale obliqua	Oblique zale	Zale	Noctuidae	1852
	Zale undularis	Black zale	Zale	Noctuidae	1773
	Zanclognatha marcidilinea	Yellowish zanclognatha	Zanclognatha	Erebidae	1859
—N/a	Zanclognatha martha (Status: Special concern)	Pine barrens zanclognatha Martha's zanclognatha	Zanclognatha	Erebidae	1928

== Butterflies ==
Image	Scientific name	Common name(s)	Genus	Family (Note: Subfamilies are not included)	Described
	Achalarus lyciades	Hoary edge	Achalarus	Hesperiidae	1832
—N/a	Callophrys hesseli (Status: Special concern)	Hessel's hairstreak	Callophrys	Lycaenidae	1950
—N/a	Callophrys lanoraieensis (Status: Threatened)	Bog elfin	Callophrys	Lycaenidae	1934
	Callophrys irus (Status: Special concern)	Frosted elfin	Callophrys	Lycaenidae	1824
—N/a	Erora laeta (Status: Threatened)	Early hairstreak	Erora	Lycaenidae	1862
	Erynnis persius persius (Status: Endangered)	Persius duskywing	Erynnis	Hesperiidae	1863
	Euphyes dion (Status: Threatened)	Dion skipper Alabama skipper	Euphyes	Hesperiidae	1879
	Pieris oleracea	Mustard white	Pieris	Pieridae	1829

== Image notes ==
- Hyphantria cunea – The females of this species are unspotted.
- Lymantria dispar dispar – Males of this species are brown in color.
