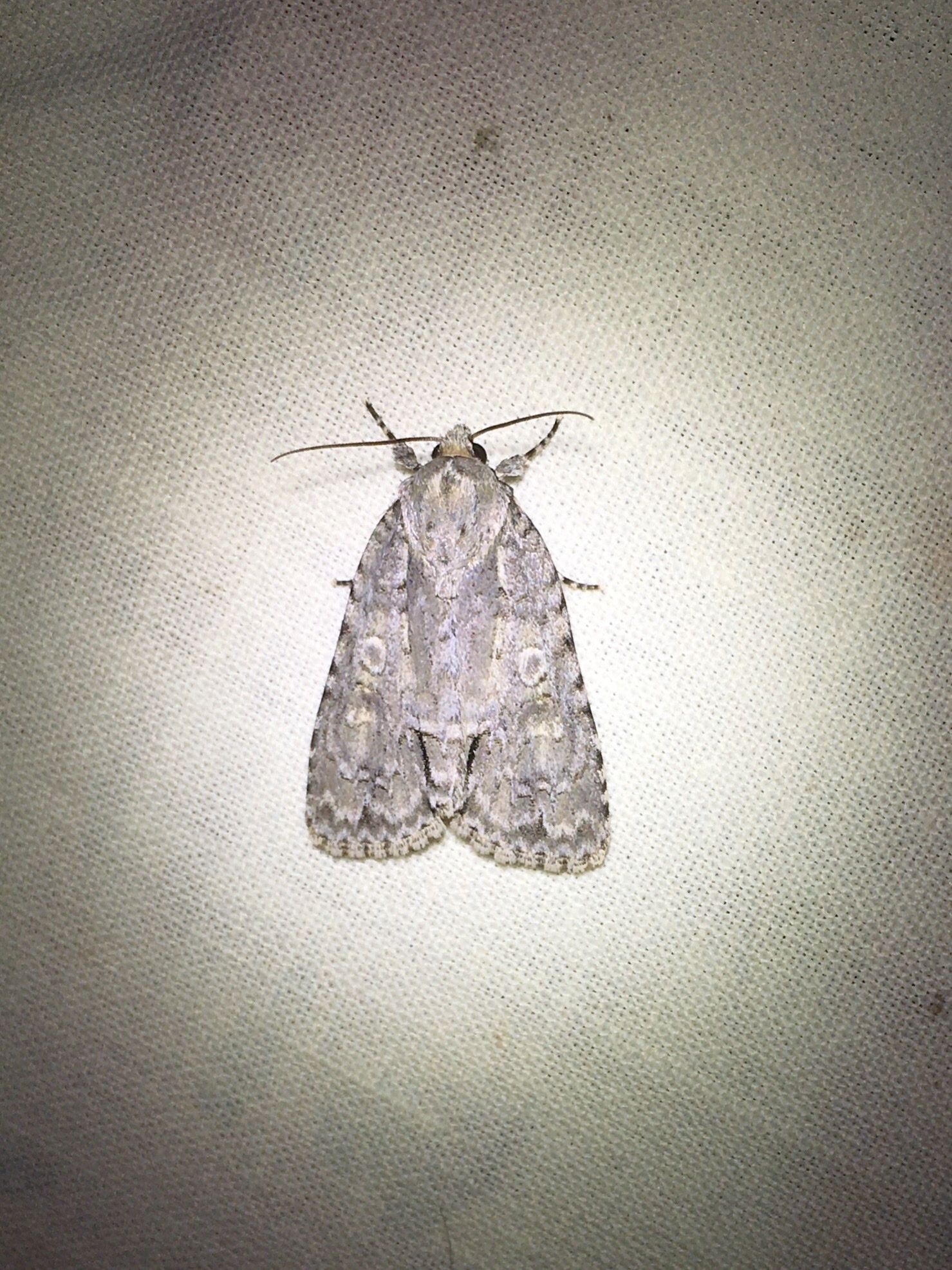
- Acronicta immodica, medium dagger, Canada

Scientific classification
- Kingdom: Animalia
- Phylum: Arthropoda
- Clade: Pancrustacea
- Class: Insecta
- Order: Lepidoptera
- Superfamily: Noctuoidea
- Family: Noctuidae
- Subfamily: Acronictinae
- Genus: Acronicta
- Species: A. immodica

Binomial name
- Acronicta immodica Schmidt & Anweiler, 2020

= Acronicta immodica =

Species of moth

Acronicta immodica, the medium dagger, is a species of owlet moth in the family Noctuidae. It is found in eastern North America.

The MONA or Hodges number for Acronicta immodica is 9242.1.

The type specimen of Acronicta modica was recently determined to be Acronicta haesitata. Because of priorities of the species descriptions, this resulted in Acronicta modica, the medium dagger moth, being renamed Acronicta immodica, and Acronicta haesitata, the hesitant dagger moth, becoming Acronicta modica. Acronicta haesitata is now a taxonomic synonym of Acronicta modica.
