= Anavitrinella atristrigaria =

Scientific classification
- Domain: Eukaryota
- Kingdom: Animalia
- Phylum: Arthropoda
- Class: Insecta
- Order: Lepidoptera
- Family: Geometridae
- Genus: Anavitrinella
- Species: A. atristrigaria

Binomial name
- Anavitrinella atristrigaria (Barnes & McDunnough, 1913)

Species of moth

Anavitrinella atristrigaria, the Gulf Coast gray, is a geometrid moth in the family Geometridae. The species was first described by William Barnes and James Halliday McDunnough in 1913. It is found in North America.

The MONA or Hodges number for Anavitrinella atristrigaria is 6591.
