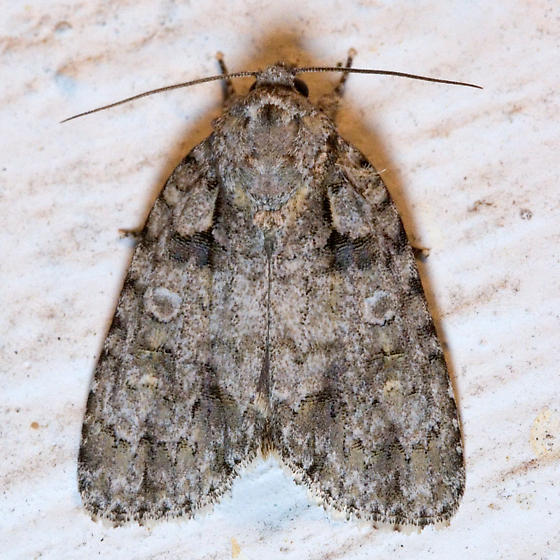

Scientific classification
- Kingdom: Animalia
- Phylum: Arthropoda
- Clade: Pancrustacea
- Class: Insecta
- Order: Lepidoptera
- Superfamily: Noctuoidea
- Family: Noctuidae
- Genus: Acronicta
- Species: A. increta

Binomial name
- Acronicta increta (Morrison, 1875)

Synonyms
- Acronycta increta Morrison 1875

= Acronicta increta =

Species of moth

Acronicta increta, the raspberry bud dagger moth, raspberry bud moth or peach sword stripe night moth, is a moth of the family Noctuidae. The species was first described by Herbert Knowles Morrison in 1875. It is distributed throughout the south of Canada and the United States down to Florida and Texas.

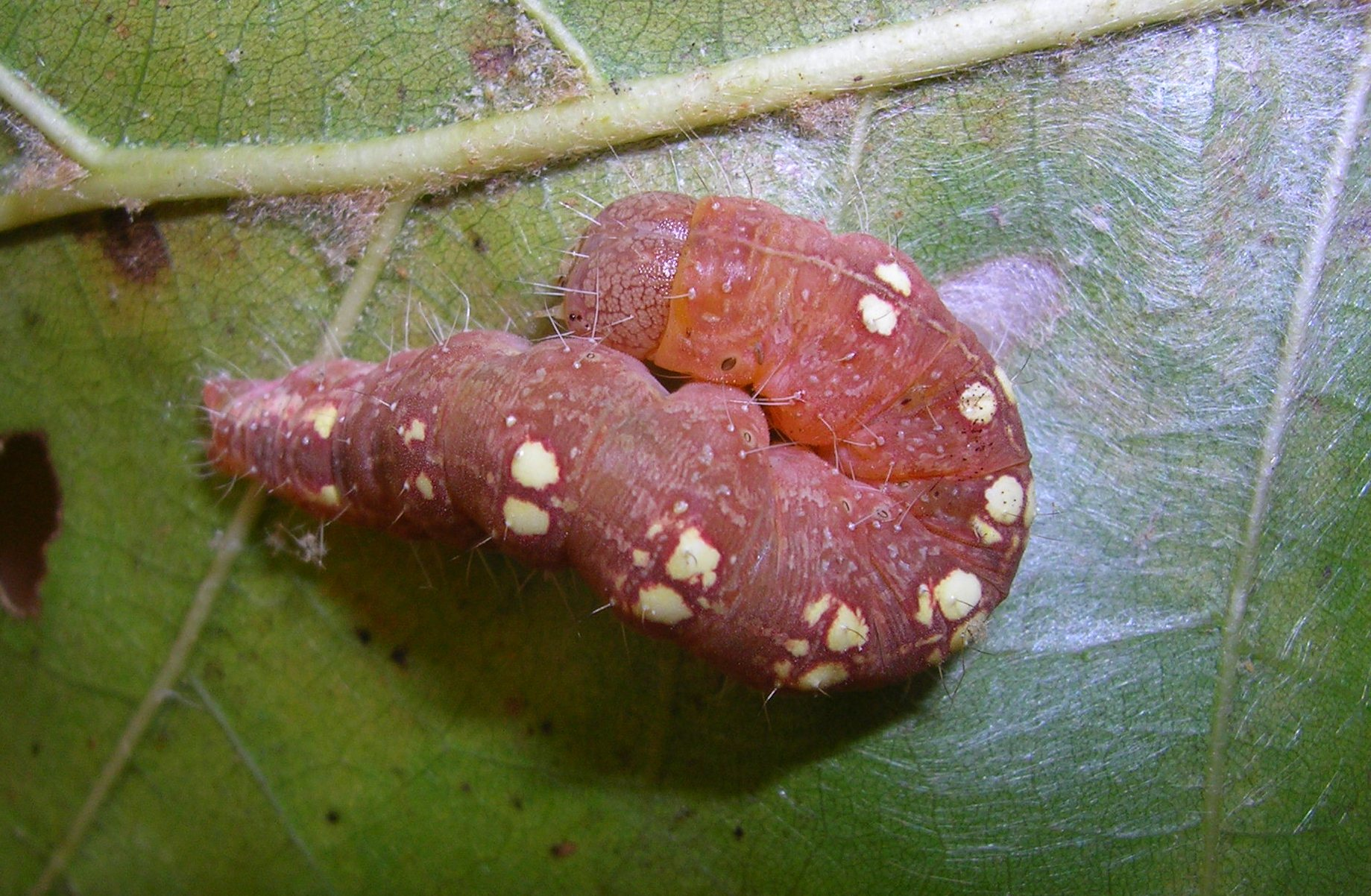
Caterpillar

The status of this species is disputed. Some authors regard Acronicta increta to be a synonym of Acronicta inclara.

The wingspan is 28–36 mm. Adults are on wing from May to September depending on the location.

The larvae probably feed on the leaves Quercus species.
