= Ulolonche dilecta =

Scientific classification
- Domain: Eukaryota
- Kingdom: Animalia
- Phylum: Arthropoda
- Class: Insecta
- Order: Lepidoptera
- Superfamily: Noctuoidea
- Family: Noctuidae
- Tribe: Eriopygini
- Genus: Ulolonche
- Species: U. dilecta

Binomial name
- Ulolonche dilecta (H. Edwards, 1885)

Species of moth

Ulolonche dilecta is a species of cutworm or dart moth in the family Noctuidae. It is found in North America.

The MONA or Hodges number for Ulolonche dilecta is 10572.
