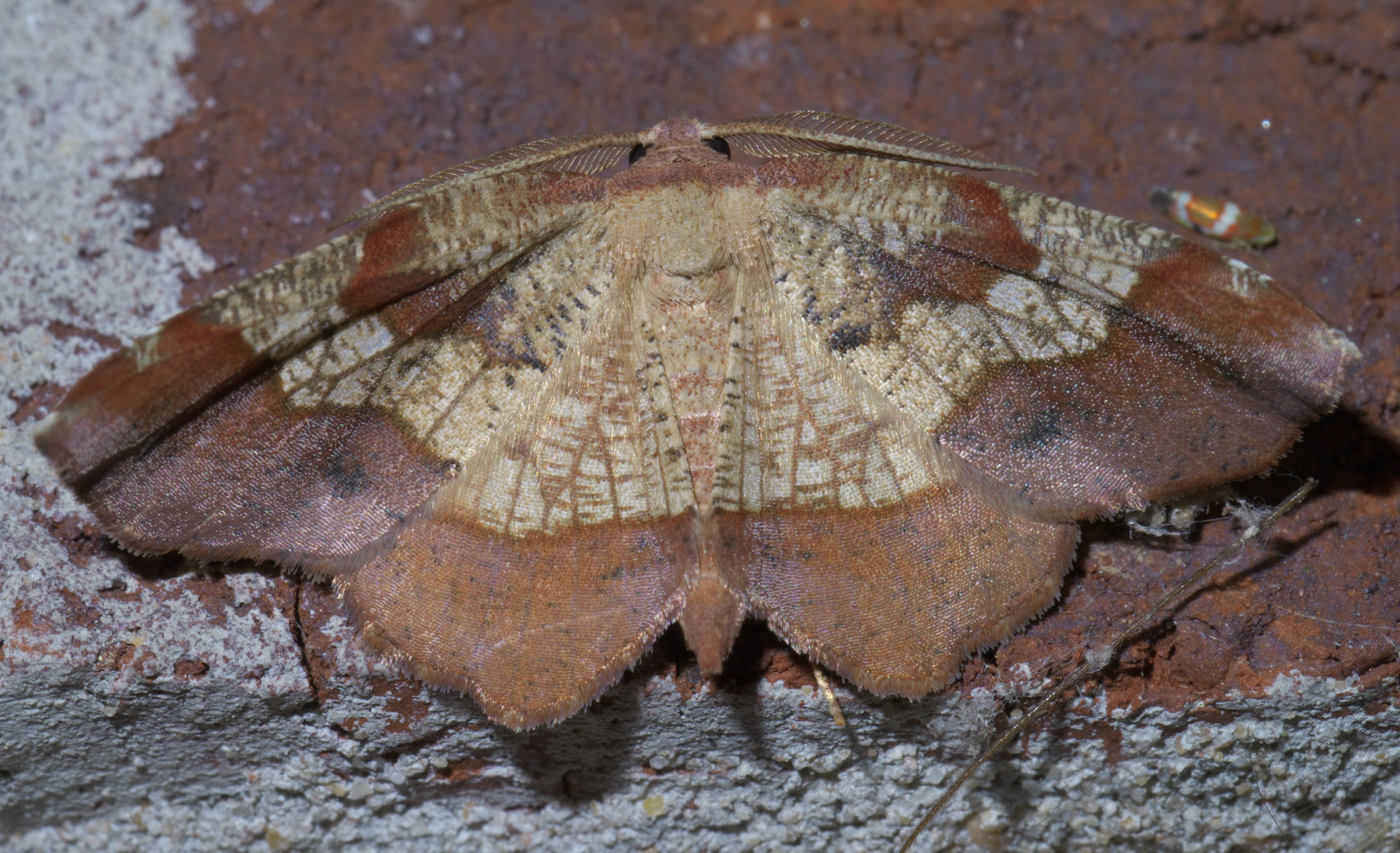

Scientific classification
- Kingdom: Animalia
- Phylum: Arthropoda
- Clade: Pancrustacea
- Class: Insecta
- Order: Lepidoptera
- Family: Geometridae
- Subfamily: Ennominae
- Genus: Probole
- Species: P. amicaria

Binomial name
- Probole amicaria (Herrich-Schaffer, 1855)

Synonyms
- Metrocampa amicaria Herrich-Schäffer, 1855

= Probole amicaria =

Species of moth

Probole amicaria, known generally as the friendly probole or redcheeked looper, is a species of geometrid moth in the family Geometridae. It is found in North America.

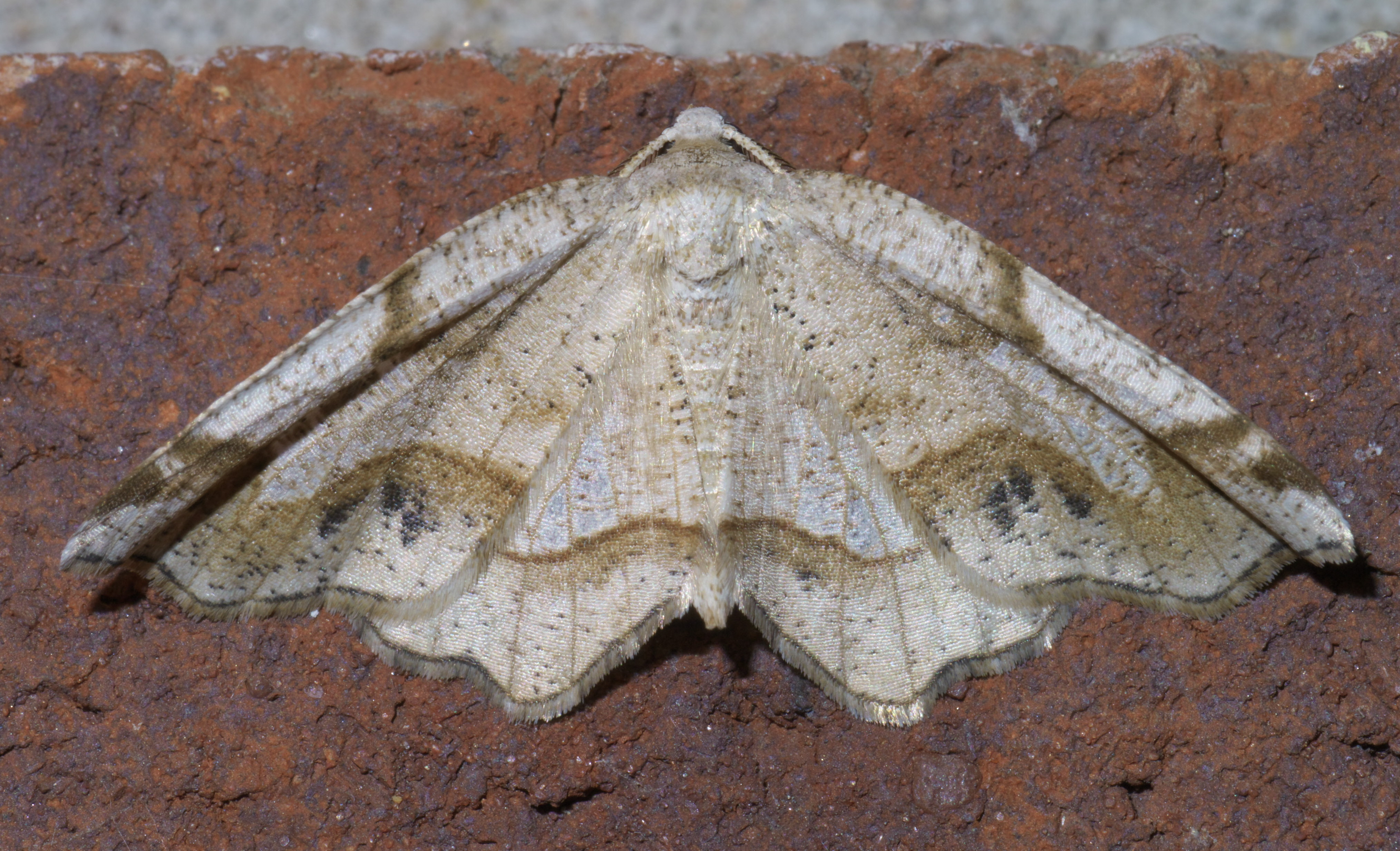
Friendly probole, Probole amicaria

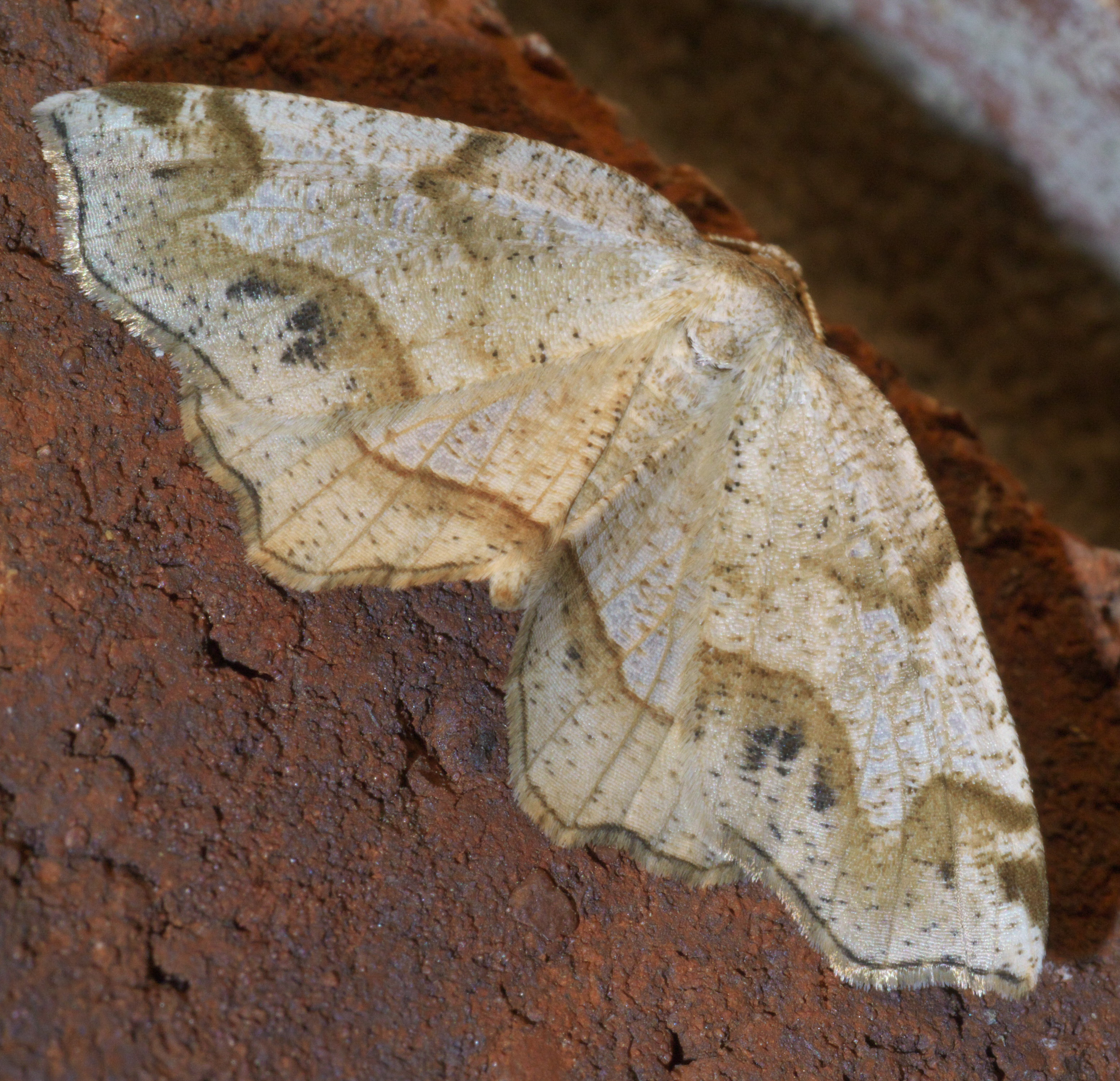
Friendly probole, Probole amicaria
