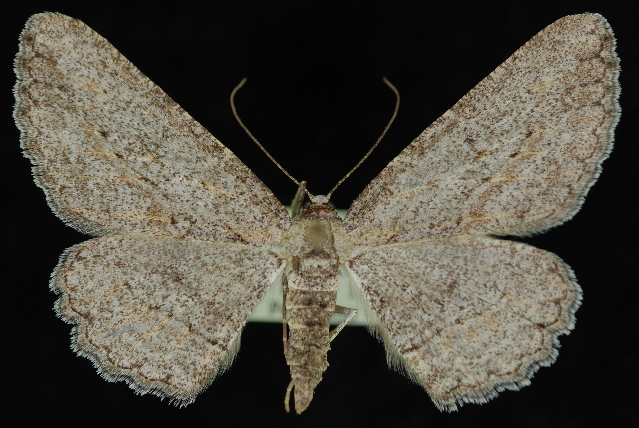

Scientific classification
- Kingdom: Animalia
- Phylum: Arthropoda
- Clade: Pancrustacea
- Class: Insecta
- Order: Lepidoptera
- Family: Geometridae
- Genus: Anavitrinella
- Species: A. addendaria

Binomial name
- Anavitrinella addendaria (Grossbeck, 1908)

= Anavitrinella addendaria =

Species of moth

Anavitrinella addendaria is a species of geometrid moth in the family Geometridae.
