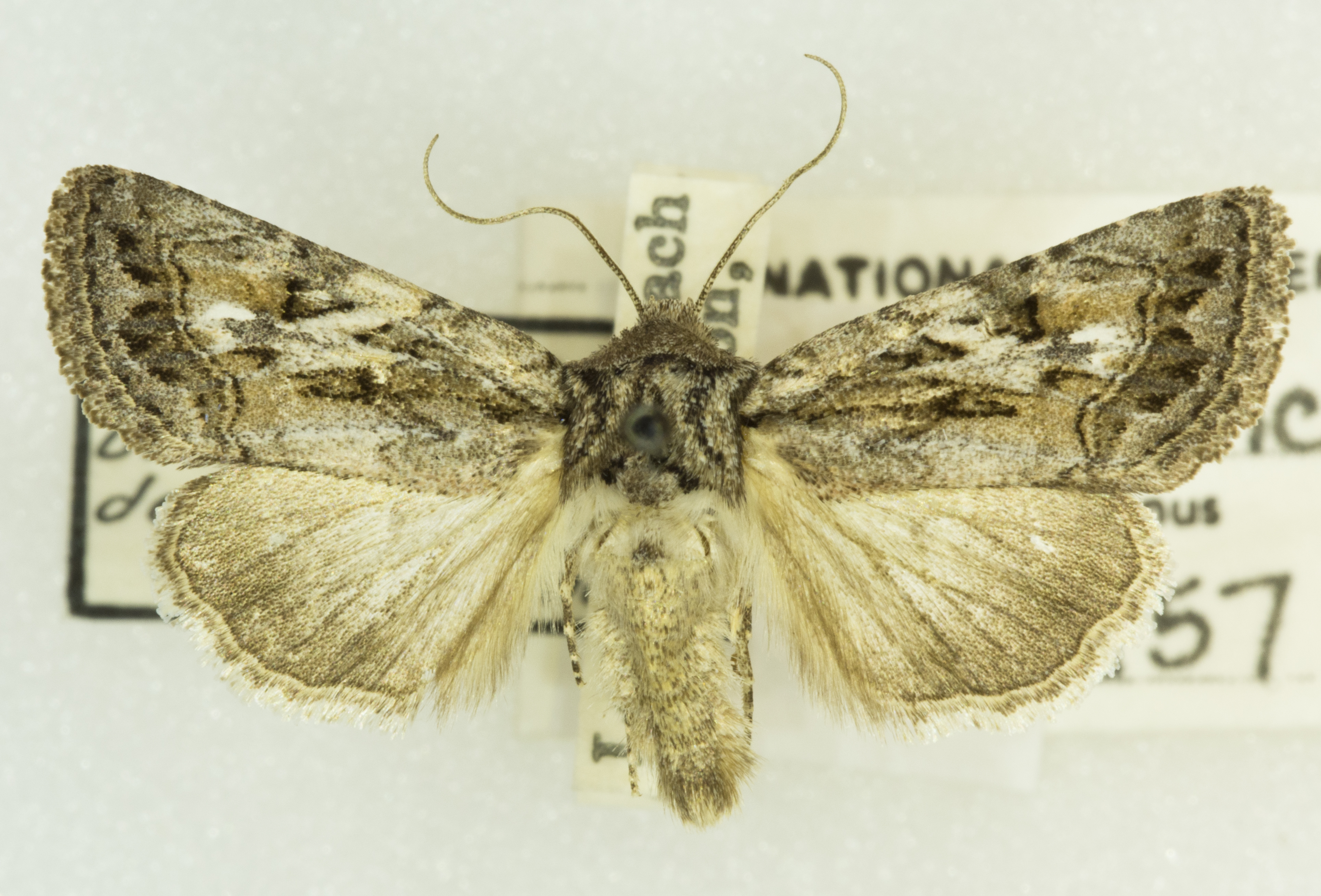

Scientific classification
- Domain: Eukaryota
- Kingdom: Animalia
- Phylum: Arthropoda
- Class: Insecta
- Order: Lepidoptera
- Superfamily: Noctuoidea
- Family: Noctuidae
- Tribe: Eriopygini
- Genus: Ulolonche
- Species: U. orbiculata

Binomial name
- Ulolonche orbiculata (Smith, 1891)

Synonyms
- Mamestra orbiculata Smith, 1891; Hyssia orbiculata (Smith, 1891)

= Ulolonche orbiculata =

Species of moth

Ulolonche orbiculata is a species of cutworm or dart moth in the family Noctuidae. It is found in North America.

The MONA or Hodges number for Ulolonche orbiculata is 10574.
