= Ulolonche consopita =

Scientific classification
- Kingdom: Animalia
- Phylum: Arthropoda
- Class: Insecta
- Order: Lepidoptera
- Superfamily: Noctuoidea
- Family: Noctuidae
- Genus: Ulolonche
- Species: U. consopita

Binomial name
- Ulolonche consopita (Grote, 1881)

Species of moth

Ulolonche consopita is a species of cutworm or dart moth in the family Noctuidae. It is found in North America.

The MONA or Hodges number for Ulolonche consopita is 10568.
