= Hyperaeschra tortuosa =

Scientific classification
- Kingdom: Animalia
- Phylum: Arthropoda
- Clade: Pancrustacea
- Class: Insecta
- Order: Lepidoptera
- Superfamily: Noctuoidea
- Family: Notodontidae
- Genus: Hyperaeschra
- Species: H. tortuosa

Binomial name
- Hyperaeschra tortuosa (Tepper, 1881)

Synonyms
- Drynobia tortuosa Tepper, 1881

Species of moth

Hyperaeschra tortuosa is a species of prominent moth in the family Notodontidae. It was described by J. G. O. Tepper in 1881 and is found in North America.

The MONA or Hodges number for Hyperaeschra tortuosa is 7918.
