= Ulolonche niveiguttata =

Scientific classification
- Kingdom: Animalia
- Phylum: Arthropoda
- Class: Insecta
- Order: Lepidoptera
- Superfamily: Noctuoidea
- Family: Noctuidae
- Genus: Ulolonche
- Species: U. niveiguttata

Binomial name
- Ulolonche niveiguttata (Grote, 1873)

Synonyms
- Mamestra niveiguttata Grote, 1873; Hyssia niveiguttata (Grote, 1873)

Species of moth

Ulolonche niveiguttata is a species of cutworm or dart moth in the family Noctuidae. It is found in North America.

The MONA or Hodges number for Ulolonche niveiguttata is 10575.
