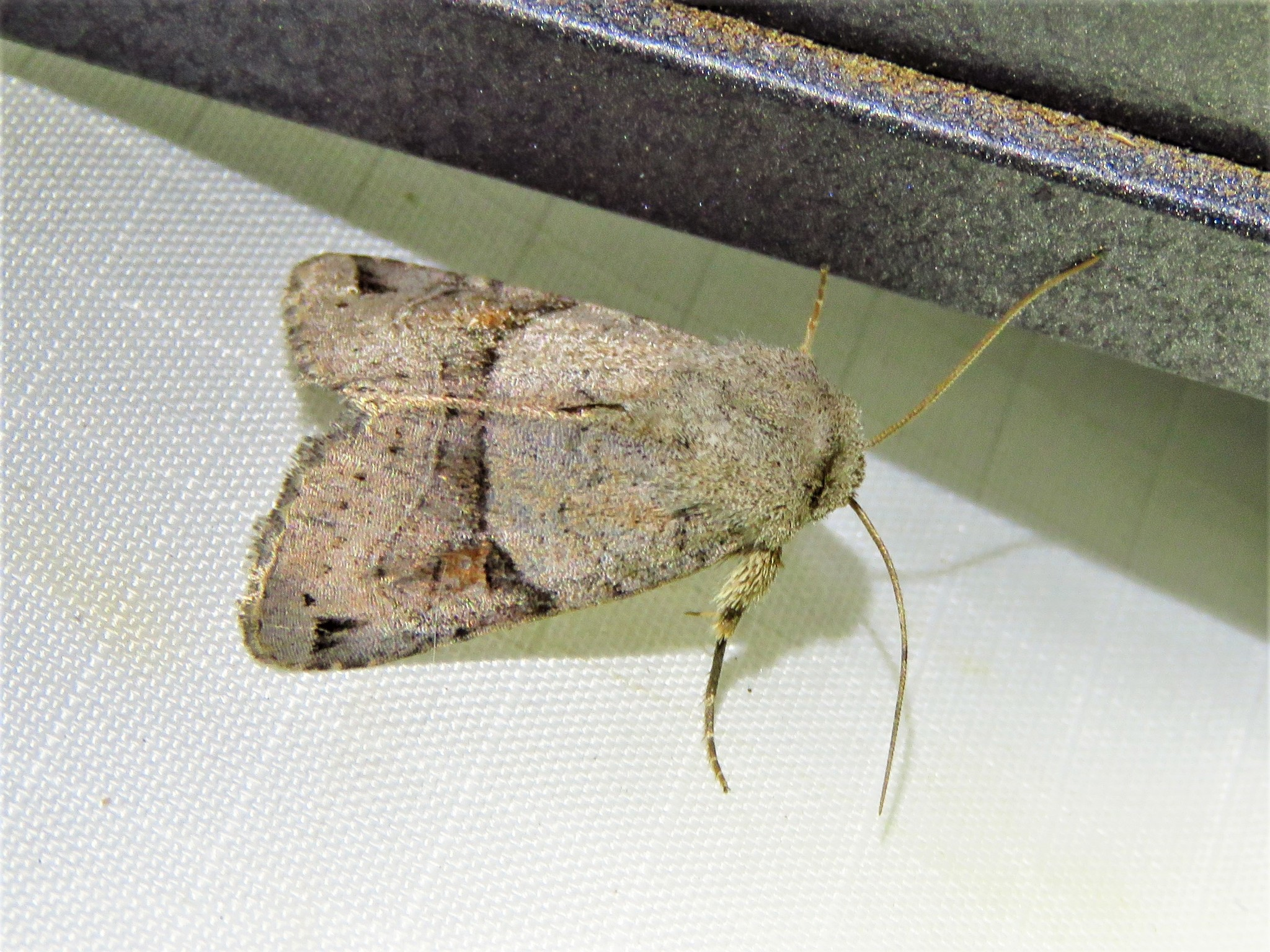
- Ulolonche disticha, Texas

Scientific classification
- Kingdom: Animalia
- Phylum: Arthropoda
- Class: Insecta
- Order: Lepidoptera
- Superfamily: Noctuoidea
- Family: Noctuidae
- Tribe: Eriopygini
- Genus: Ulolonche
- Species: U. disticha

Binomial name
- Ulolonche disticha (Morrison, 1875)

= Ulolonche disticha =

Species of moth

Ulolonche disticha is a species of cutworm or dart moth in the family Noctuidae. It is found in Mexico and the southwestern United States.

The MONA or Hodges number for Ulolonche disticha is 10573.
