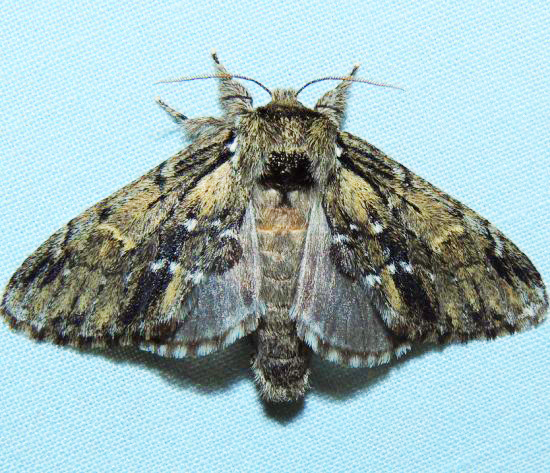

Scientific classification
- Kingdom: Animalia
- Phylum: Arthropoda
- Clade: Pancrustacea
- Class: Insecta
- Order: Lepidoptera
- Superfamily: Noctuoidea
- Family: Notodontidae
- Genus: Hyperaeschra
- Species: H. georgica

Binomial name
- Hyperaeschra georgica (Herrich-Schäffer, 1855)

= Hyperaeschra georgica =

Species of moth

Hyperaeschra georgica, the Georgian prominent, is a species of moth in the family Notodontidae (the prominents). It was first described by Gottlieb August Wilhelm Herrich-Schäffer in 1855 and it is found in North America and parts of Australia.

The MONA or Hodges number for Hyperaeschra georgica is 7917.

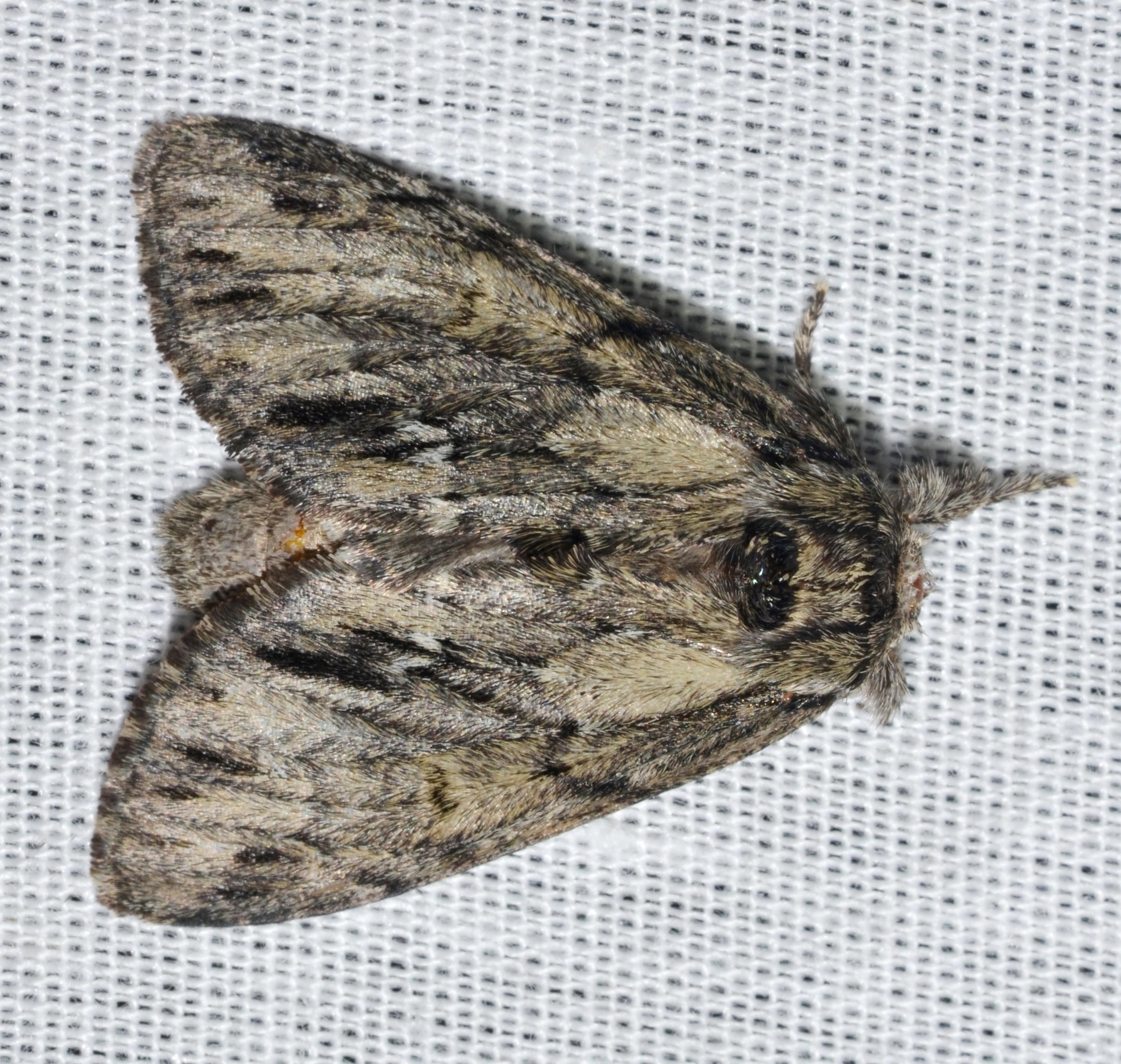
Georgian prominent, Hyperaeschra georgica
