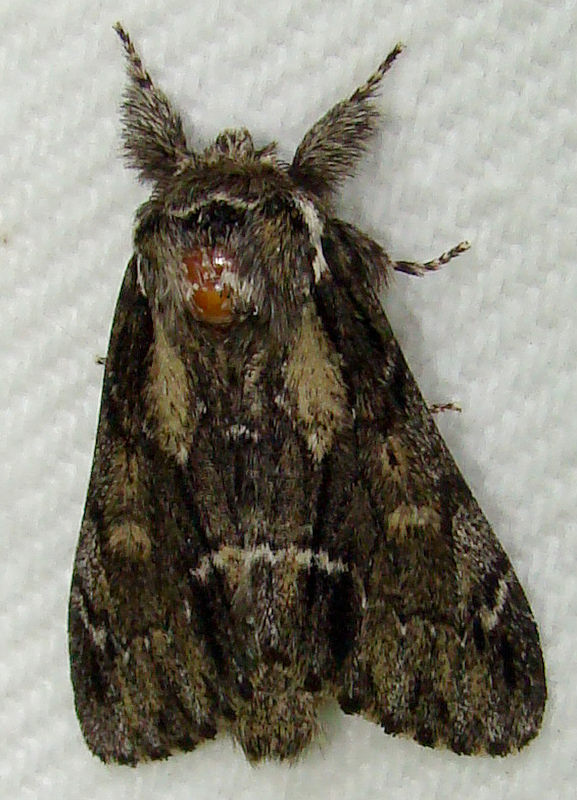
- Hyperaeschra georgica

Scientific classification
- Kingdom: Animalia
- Phylum: Arthropoda
- Clade: Pancrustacea
- Class: Insecta
- Order: Lepidoptera
- Superfamily: Noctuoidea
- Family: Notodontidae
- Tribe: Notodontini
- Genus: Hyperaeschra; Butler, 1880

= Hyperaeschra =

Genus of moths

Hyperaeschra is a genus of moths of the family Notodontidae erected by Arthur Gardiner Butler in 1880.

== Selected species ==
- Hyperaeschra dentata Hampson, [1893]
- Hyperaeschra georgica (Herrich-Schäffer, 1855)
- Hyperaeschra tortuosa Tepper, 1881
- Hyperaeschra pallida Butler, 1882
