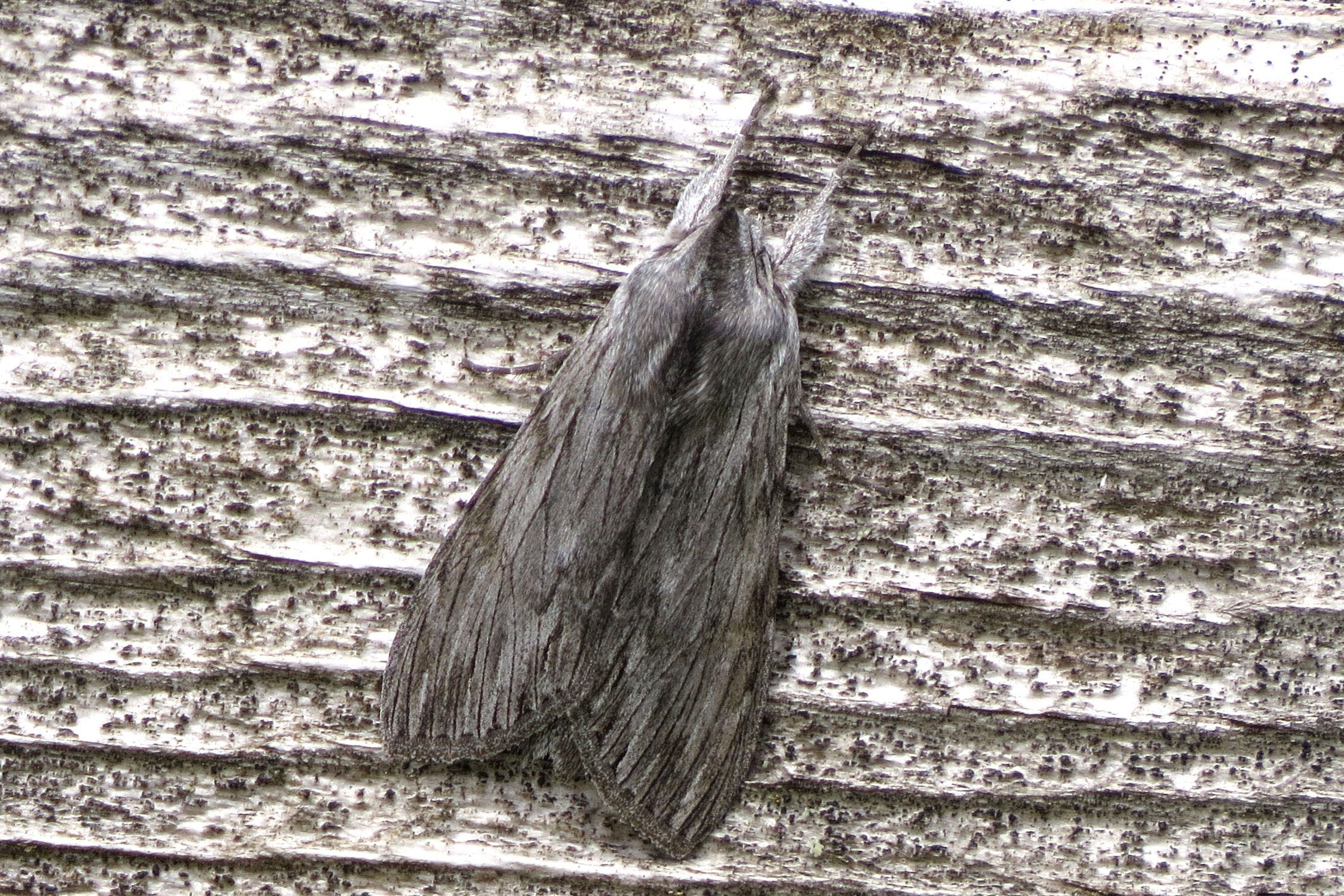
- Fletcher Wildlife Garden, Ottawa, Canada

Scientific classification
- Kingdom: Animalia
- Phylum: Arthropoda
- Clade: Pancrustacea
- Class: Insecta
- Order: Lepidoptera
- Superfamily: Noctuoidea
- Family: Noctuidae
- Genus: Acronicta
- Species: A. lithospila

Binomial name
- Acronicta lithospila Grote, 1874

= Acronicta lithospila =

Species of moth

Acronicta lithospila, the streaked dagger moth, is a moth of the family Noctuidae described by Augustus Radcliffe Grote in 1874. It is found in Canada (Nova Scotia, New Brunswick, Quebec, and Ontario) and the United States (including Georgia, Maryland and Oklahoma).

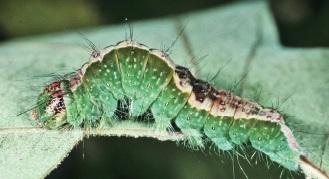
Larva

The wingspan is about 35 mm. Adults are on wing from June to August depending on the location.

The larvae feed on hickory, oak, and chestnut.
