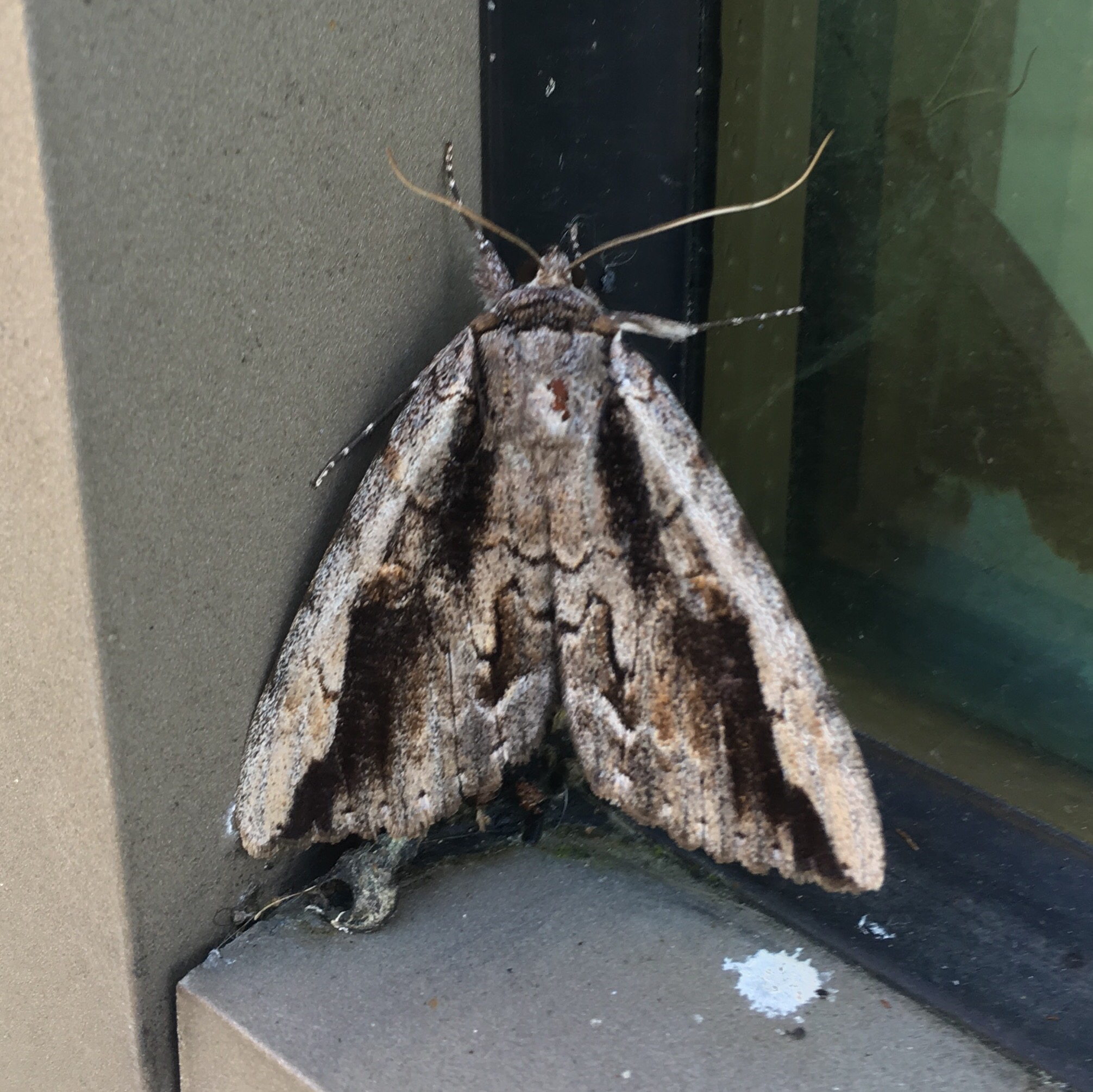

Scientific classification
- Kingdom: Animalia
- Phylum: Arthropoda
- Class: Insecta
- Order: Lepidoptera
- Superfamily: Noctuoidea
- Family: Erebidae
- Genus: Catocala
- Species: C. angusi

Binomial name
- Catocala angusi Grote, 1876

Synonyms
- Catabapta angusi; Catocala angusi lucetta French, 1882; Catocala edna Beutenmueller, 1907

= Catocala angusi =

Species of moth

Catocala angusi, commonly known as Angus' underwing, is a species of moth in the family Erebidae. It is found from Massachusetts and Connecticut south to Georgia west to Arkansas and Kansas and north to Illinois and Michigan.

The wingspan is 60–74 mm. Adults are on wing from July to October depending on the location.

The larvae feed on Carya illinoinensis and Carya ovata.
