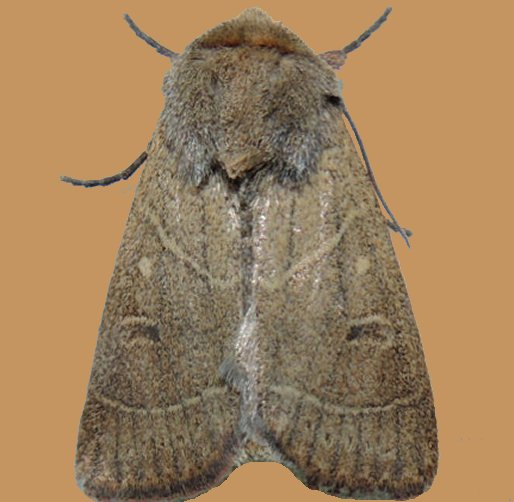
- Ulolonche culea

Scientific classification
- Domain: Eukaryota
- Kingdom: Animalia
- Phylum: Arthropoda
- Class: Insecta
- Order: Lepidoptera
- Superfamily: Noctuoidea
- Family: Noctuidae
- Tribe: Eriopygini
- Genus: Ulolonche; Smith, 1888

= Ulolonche =

Genus of moths

Ulolonche is a genus of moths of the family Noctuidae.

== Species ==
- Ulolonche consopita (Grote, 1881)
- Ulolonche culea (Guenée, 1852)
- Ulolonche dilecta (H. Edwards, 1884)
- Ulolonche disticha (Morrison, 1875)
- Ulolonche fasciata Smith, 1888 (=Ulolonche marloffi (Barnes & Benjamin, 1924))
- Ulolonche modesta (Morrison, 1875)
- Ulolonche niveiguttata (Grote, 1873)
- Ulolonche orbiculata (Smith, 1891)
