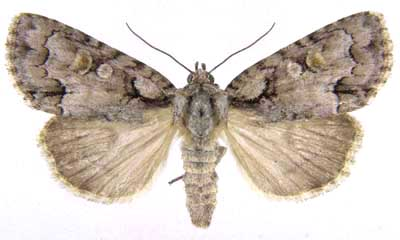

Scientific classification
- Kingdom: Animalia
- Phylum: Arthropoda
- Clade: Pancrustacea
- Class: Insecta
- Order: Lepidoptera
- Superfamily: Noctuoidea
- Family: Noctuidae
- Genus: Acronicta
- Species: A. albarufa

Binomial name
- Acronicta albarufa Grote, 1874

Synonyms
- Acronicta walkeri Andrews, 1877

= Acronicta albarufa =

Barrens dagger moth

Species of moth

Acronicta albarufa, the barrens dagger moth, is a moth of the family Noctuidae. It has a fragmented distribution in North America that includes southern Ontario and Manitoba, New York, New Jersey, Massachusetts, North Carolina, Virginia, Georgia, Oklahoma, Missouri, Arkansas, and Colorado. It may also be present in Ohio, Pennsylvania, Connecticut, mainland New York and New Mexico. It has been suggested that populations in the south-western United States may be a separate species. It is listed as a species of special concern and believed extirpated in the US state of Connecticut.

The larvae feed on Quercus ilicifolia, though other oak leaves have been used.

== Distribution and occurrence ==
Barrens dagger moth has a fragmented distribution that includes southern Ontario and Manitoba, New York, New Jersey, Massachusetts, North Carolina, Virginia, Georgia, Oklahoma, Missouri, Arkansas, and Colorado. It may be extirpated from Ohio, Pennsylvania, Connecticut, mainland New York, and New Mexico. It has been suggested that populations in the southwestern United States may be a separate species. No maps of barrens dagger moth distribution were available as of 2008.

Barrens dagger moths generally occur in oak (Quercus spp.) or pine (Pinus spp.) barren communities. They are associated with pitch pine–bear oak (P. rigida–Q. ilicifolia) forest and oak scrub communities in New England and southeastern New York. On Martha's Vineyard, they may be associated with frost-bottom communities (Goldstein 1994, cited in). They have been observed in black oak–post oak (Q. velutina–Q. stellata) woodland in New Jersey and occur in an area of the Atlantic City International Airport that has been mowed every 1 to 2 years since the 1940s. Barrens dagger moths occupy oak savannahs and oak-hickory (Carya spp.) forests in the western and southern portions of their range

== Life history ==
Barrens dagger moths are nocturnal and are typically just over an inch (3.0–3.5 cm) long. The period in which adults emerge from cocoons extends over 2 months. Adult barrens dagger moths are typically active from June to August but have been documented from late May to September in New Jersey and Missouri. Dagger moth species that occupy pine barrens can be found 1 to 2 miles (2–3 km) from suitable habitat, suggesting considerable dispersal potential. Adults generally produce one brood. However, in New Jersey and Missouri, eggs laid in mid-June may result in a partial second brood. Eggs are laid in July or August and typically take about 6 days to hatch. Larvae are present for 4 to 5 weeks in late June to September or October. If second-brood larvae occur, it may take 8 to 10 weeks for these individuals to begin pupation. Pupae are present in fall, winter, and spring. Barrens dagger moth may pupate in a flimsy cocoon in soil, although the precise location(s) of pupae is uncertain. Pupae do not seem to overwinter more than once.

== Preferred habitat ==
Barrens dagger moth habitat is often described as sandy, xeric, and open oak-dominated communities. Rare moths that occur in pitch pine-bear oak communities, including barrens dagger moth, were associated with early successional habitat patches in southeastern Massachusetts. Barrens dagger moths have not been documented in most potential habitat, despite being relatively easy to detect (see Sampling) . More detailed studies on barrens dagger moth habitat requirements are needed.

Landscape-scale characteristics may have greater influence on barren dagger moth habitat quality than patch- or plot-level characteristics. Patches of remnant habitat occupied by barrens dagger moths are typically larger than 2,000 acres (1,000 ha). In models based on surveys of rare moths in a pitch pine-bear oak community in southeastern Massachusetts, barrens dagger moth was positively associated with landscapes with a high percentage of open-canopy oak scrub and negatively associated (P=0.03) with mixed hardwood-conifer forest without pitch pine at the 1,120-acre (450 ha) scale. At a smaller scale (17 acres (7 ha)), barrens dagger moth was negatively associated (P=0.02) with the dispersion and interspersion of cover types. Connectivity of habitat did not appear important in this study area, but connectivity was generally low.

== Food habits ==
Bear oak, and possibly other oaks, are the host plants for barrens dagger moth larvae. According to a fact sheet published by the New York Natural Heritage Program, larvae feed on bur oak (Q. macrocarpa), post oak, chestnut oak (Q. prinus), and probably black oak, and adults likely eat honeydew from sucking insects and tree sap. According to the NatureServe review, larvae have been observed on post oak and dwarf chinkapin oak (Q. prinoides). Barrens dagger moths were successfully raised on black oak in captivity, but they rejected blackjack oak (Q. marilandica). Bur oak is the only oak within the Manitoba range of barrens dagger moth.

== Threats ==
Threats to the persistence of barrens dagger moths include habitat loss, fire suppression, extensive fires, high levels of white-tailed deer (Odocoileus virginianus) browsing, introduced species, insecticides, off-road vehicles, and light pollution. Introduced species that may negatively impact barrens dagger moth are gypsy moths (Lymantria dispar) and parasitoids such as compsilura (Compsilura concinnata). Spraying for mosquitoes (Culicidae) and gypsy moths could negatively impact barrens dagger moth. Since it is not as persistent as other insecticides, use of the insecticide Bacillus thuringiensis var. kurstaki in spring is recommended if severe defoliation by gypsy moths appears imminent. White-tailed deer damage may have contributed to the extirpation of the barrens dagger moth population at Pinery Provincial Park, Ontario.
