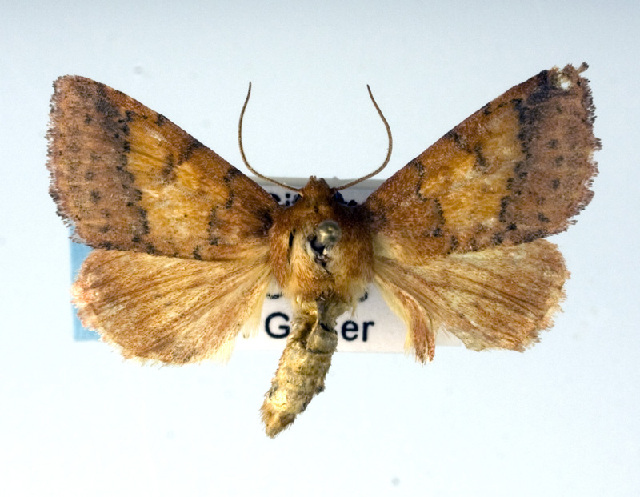
- Rhodoecia aurantiago

Scientific classification
- Kingdom: Animalia
- Phylum: Arthropoda
- Class: Insecta
- Order: Lepidoptera
- Superfamily: Noctuoidea
- Family: Noctuidae
- Subfamily: Heliothinae
- Genus: Rhodoecia; Hampson, 1910

= Rhodoecia =

Genus of moths

Rhodoecia is a genus of moths of the family Noctuidae.

== Species ==
- Rhodoecia aurantiago (Guenée, 1852)
