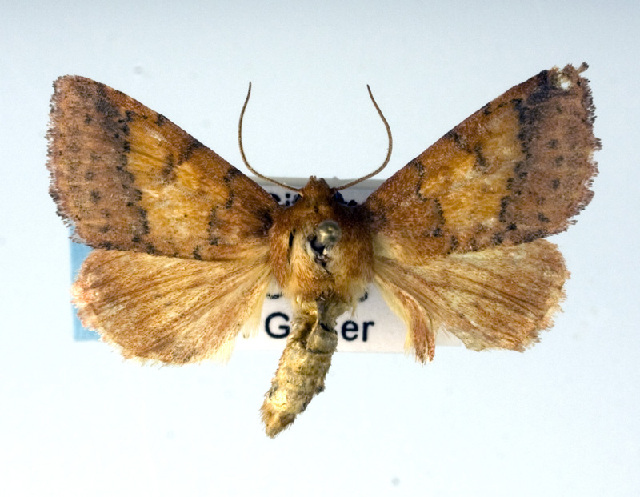

Scientific classification
- Kingdom: Animalia
- Phylum: Arthropoda
- Class: Insecta
- Order: Lepidoptera
- Superfamily: Noctuoidea
- Family: Noctuidae
- Genus: Rhodoecia
- Species: R. aurantiago

Binomial name
- Rhodoecia aurantiago (Guenée, 1852)

Synonyms
- Pyrrhia aurantiago; Rhodoecia illiterata (Grote, 1875); Rhodoecia differta (Morrison, 1875); Rhodoecia illinoisensis (French, 1879); Rhodoecia auratiago

= Rhodoecia aurantiago =

Species of insect

Rhodoecia aurantiago, the orange sallow moth or aureolaria seed borer, is a species of moth of the family Noctuidae. It has a scattered distribution from southern Maine and the hills around Boston, Massachusetts, west across southern Ontario to south-western Wisconsin and Missouri, south into Florida and Texas. It is listed as threatened in the US state of Connecticut.

The wingspan is about 30 mm. Adults are on wing from July into September in the north. In the south adults are on wing mostly in September in Texas and North Carolina, and from sometime in September through October in Florida.

The larvae feed on Aureolaria flava and Aureolaria pedicularia.
