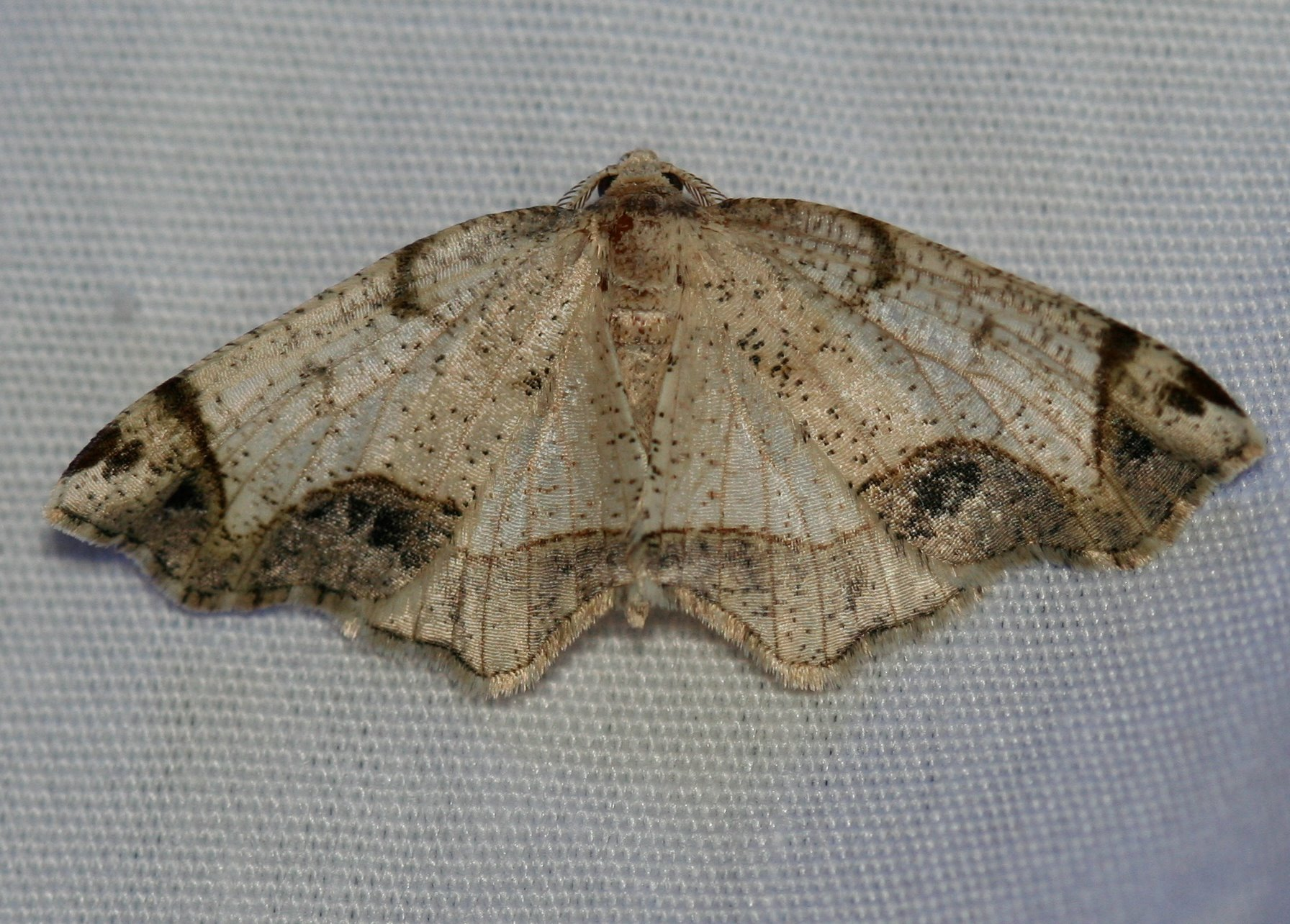
- Probole alienaria

Scientific classification
- Kingdom: Animalia
- Phylum: Arthropoda
- Class: Insecta
- Order: Lepidoptera
- Family: Geometridae
- Subfamily: Ennominae
- Genus: Probole; Herrich-Schäffer, 1855

Species
- Disputed, see text

= Probole =

Genus of moths

Probole is a genus of moths in the family Geometridae, the geometer moths. It is a Nearctic genus distributed throughout Canada and much of the United States.

The taxonomy of this genus has never been clear. In 2007 it was revised using evidence from studies of morphology, mitochondrial DNA, and development. These studies suggested that all the moths in the genus are actually members of a single species, Probole amicaria, making the genus monotypic. It is simply a variable species, with sexual dimorphism as well as variability across its geographical range, within a single population, and even within a single brood. Adult Probole are also seasonally dimorphic. Other moths of the genus, which have included Probole alienaria and P. nepiasaria, are now treated as variations within the species.

== Species ==
- Probole amicaria (Herrich-Schaffer, 1855) – friendly pobole or red-cheeked looper
- Probole alienaria Herrich-Schaffer, 1855 – alien probole
