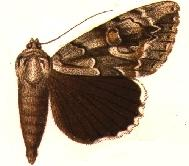

Scientific classification
- Kingdom: Animalia
- Phylum: Arthropoda
- Class: Insecta
- Order: Lepidoptera
- Superfamily: Noctuoidea
- Family: Erebidae
- Genus: Catocala
- Species: C. flebilis

Binomial name
- Catocala flebilis Grote, 1872

Synonyms
- Catabapta flebilis; Catocala dejecta carolina Holland, 1903

= Catocala flebilis =

Species of moth

Catocala flebilis, the mourning underwing, is a moth of the family Erebidae. The species was first described by Augustus Radcliffe Grote in 1872. It is found in North America from Massachusetts and Connecticut south to North Carolina and Georgia, west to Arkansas and north to Michigan and Illinois and into southern Ontario.

The wingspan is 45–65 mm. Adults are on wing from July to September depending on the location.

The larvae feed on Carya glabra and Carya ovata.
