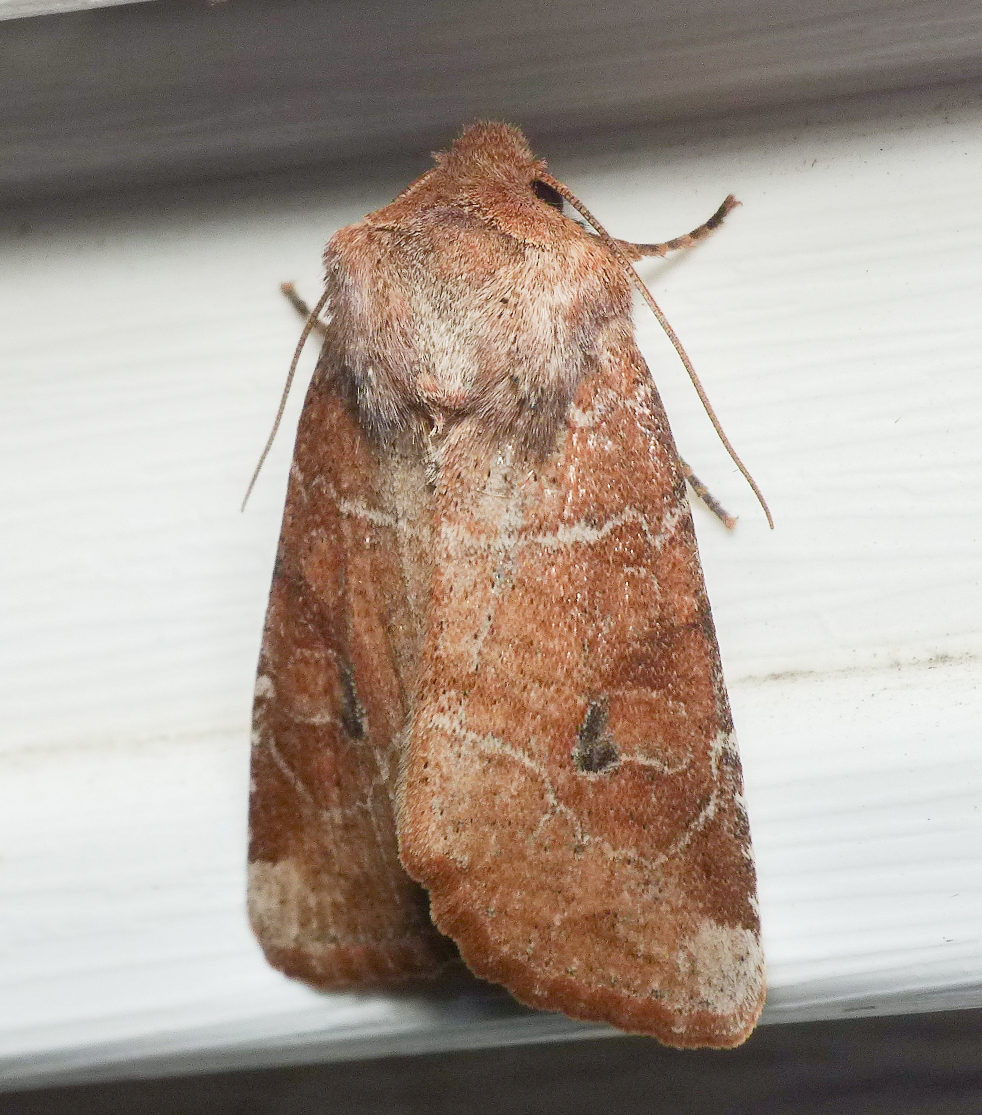
- Crocigrapha normani, Norman's quaker, New York state

Scientific classification
- Kingdom: Animalia
- Phylum: Arthropoda
- Clade: Pancrustacea
- Class: Insecta
- Order: Lepidoptera
- Superfamily: Noctuoidea
- Family: Noctuidae
- Subfamily: Noctuinae
- Tribe: Orthosiini
- Genus: Crocigrapha; Grote, 1875
- Species: C. normani

Binomial name
- Crocigrapha normani (Grote, 1874)

= Crocigrapha =

Genus of moths

Crocigrapha is a genus of moths of the family Noctuidae. It contains one species, Crocigrapha normani, commonly called Norman's quaker. It is found primarily in eastern North America, although it has been reported as far west as Alberta and Colorado.
