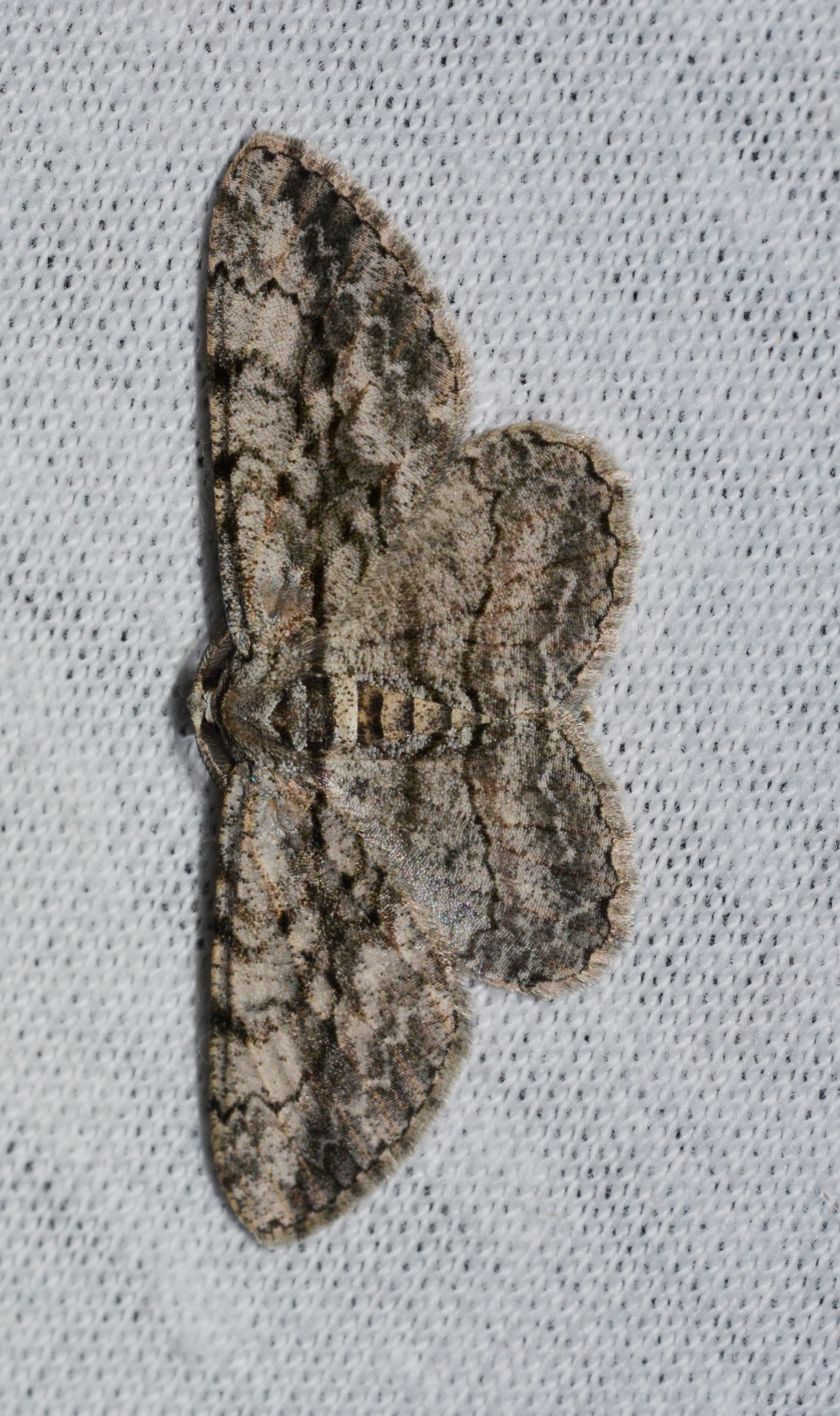

Scientific classification
- Kingdom: Animalia
- Phylum: Arthropoda
- Class: Insecta
- Order: Lepidoptera
- Family: Geometridae
- Subfamily: Ennominae
- Tribe: Boarmiini
- Genus: Anavitrinella
- Species: A. pampinaria

Binomial name
- Anavitrinella pampinaria (Guenée, 1857)

Synonyms
- Boarmia pampinaria Guenée, 1857; Anavitrinelia pampinaria; Anavitrinella frugaliaria (Guenée, 1857); Anavitrinella collecta (Walker, 1860); Anavitrinella psilogrammaria (Zeller, 1872); Anavitrinella fraudulentaria (Zeller, 1872); Cleora pampinaria var. nubiferaria Swett, 1913; Anavitrinella stygia (Franclemont, 1938) (melanic form); Anavitrinella pampinaria erosiata (Walker, 1863)

= Anavitrinella pampinaria =

Species of moth

Anavitrinella pampinaria, the common gray, is a moth of the family Geometridae. The species was first described by Achille Guenée in 1857. It is found in most of North America except the Arctic regions, south to Mexico.

The wingspan is 23–34 mm.

Adults are on wing from April to October.

The larvae feed on Malus, Fraxinus, Trifolium, Pyrus, Populus and Salix species.
