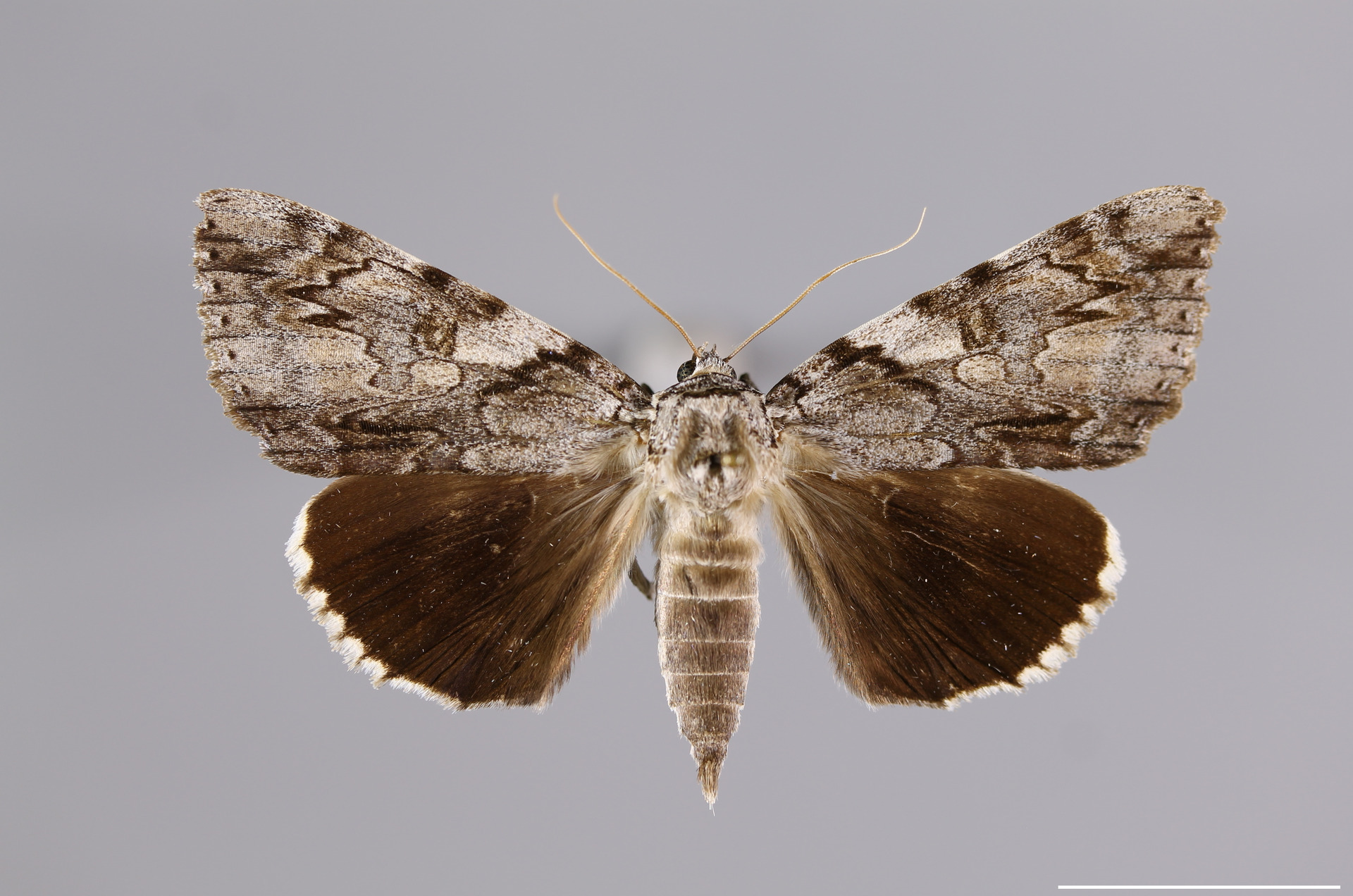

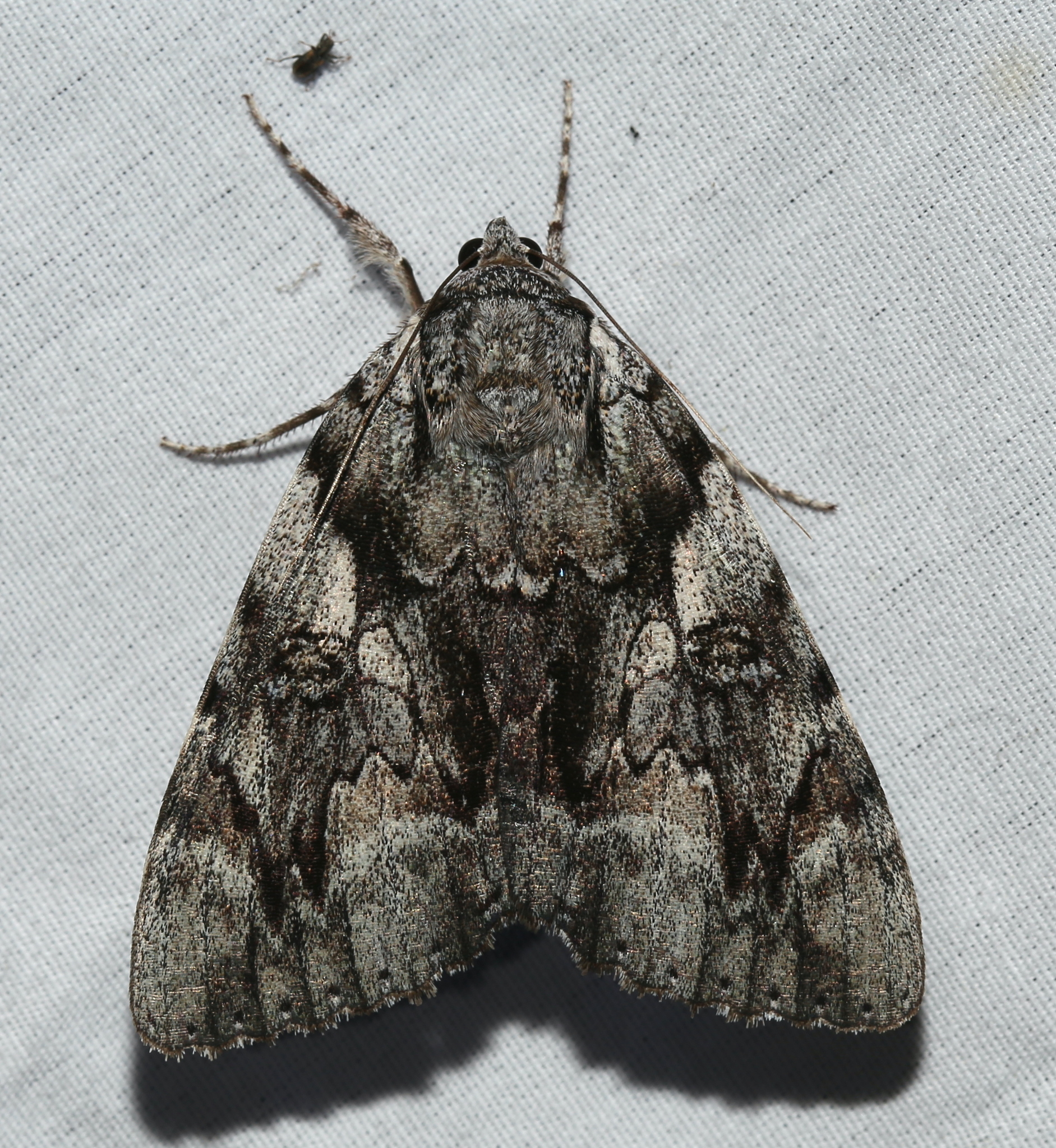

Scientific classification
- Kingdom: Animalia
- Phylum: Arthropoda
- Class: Insecta
- Order: Lepidoptera
- Superfamily: Noctuoidea
- Family: Erebidae
- Genus: Catocala
- Species: C. dejecta

Binomial name
- Catocala dejecta Strecker, 1880

Synonyms
- Catabapta dejecta

= Catocala dejecta =

Species of moth

Catocala dejecta, the dejected underwing, is a moth of the family Erebidae. It is found from Massachusetts and Connecticut south through New Jersey to Florida, west to Texas and Oklahoma and north to southern Ontario.

The wingspan is 56–73 mm. Adults are on wing from June to October depending on the location.

The larvae feed on Carya glabra, Carya ovata and Quercus species.
