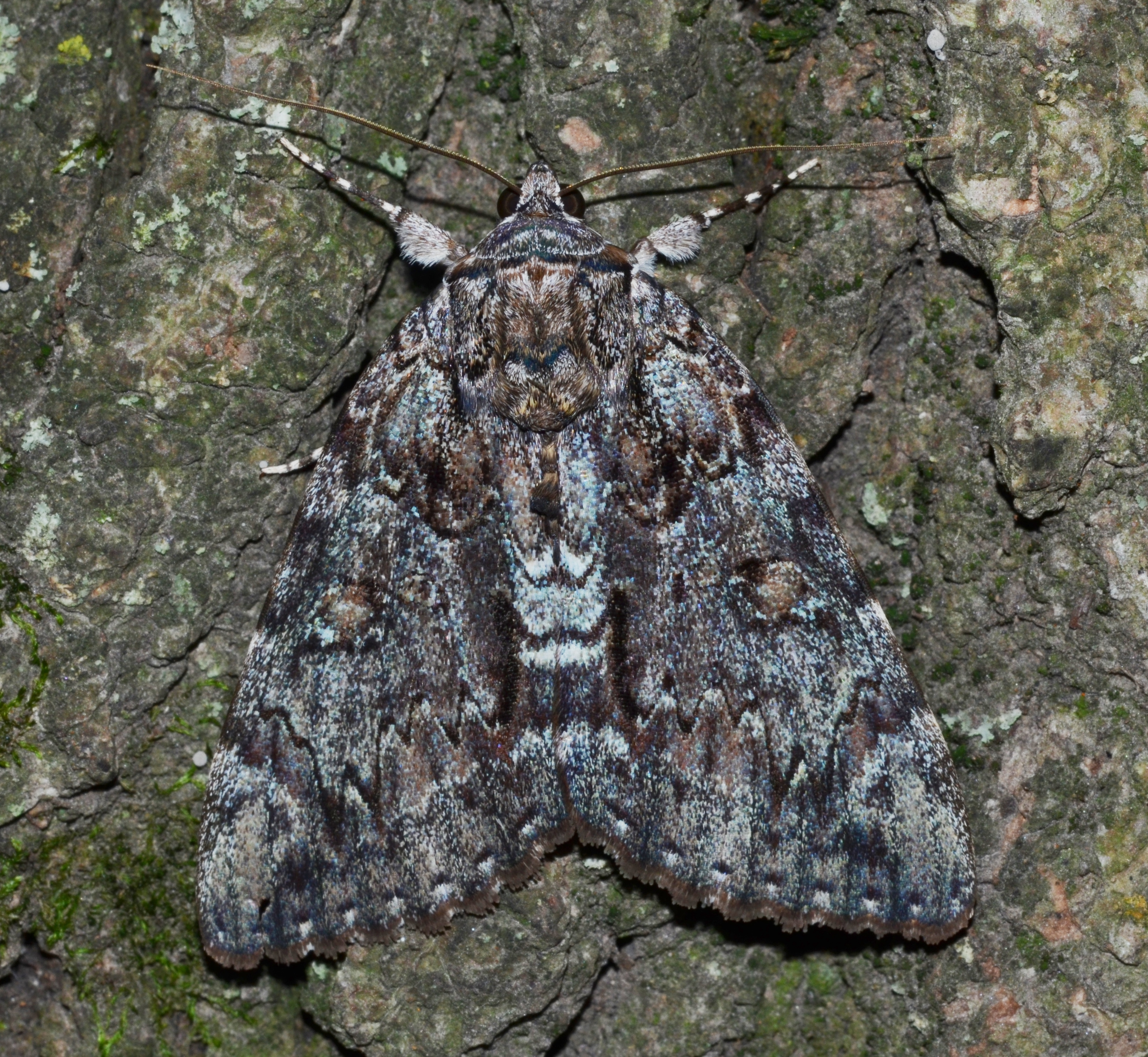

Scientific classification
- Kingdom: Animalia
- Phylum: Arthropoda
- Class: Insecta
- Order: Lepidoptera
- Superfamily: Noctuoidea
- Family: Erebidae
- Genus: Catocala
- Species: C. lacrymosa

Binomial name
- Catocala lacrymosa Guenée, 1852

Synonyms
- Catabapta lacrymosa; Catocala evelina French, 1881; Catocala emilia H. Edwards, 1881; Catocala zelica French, 1881; Catocala paulina H. Edwards, 1880; Catocala albomarginata Cassino, 1917

= Catocala lacrymosa =

Species of moth

Catocala lacrymosa, the tearful underwing, is a moth of the family Erebidae. It is found from Massachusetts and Connecticut south to Florida, west to Texas and eastern Oklahoma and north to Illinois and Michigan and into southern Ontario.

The wingspan is 60–82 mm. Adults are on wing from July to September depending on the location. There is one generation per year.

The larvae feed on Carya species.
