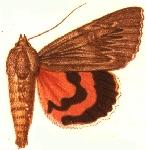

Scientific classification
- Kingdom: Animalia
- Phylum: Arthropoda
- Class: Insecta
- Order: Lepidoptera
- Superfamily: Noctuoidea
- Family: Erebidae
- Genus: Catocala
- Species: C. herodias

Binomial name
- Catocala herodias Strecker, 1876

Synonyms
- Catocala ultronia herodias; Catocala gerhardi Barnes & Benjamin, 1927

= Catocala herodias =

Species of moth

Catocala herodias, the Herodias underwing or Gerhard's underwing, is a moth of the family Erebidae. The species was first described by Strecker in 1876. The nominate form is found in the US states of Texas and Oklahoma. Subspecies Catocala herodias gerhardi is found from Massachusetts, Connecticut, New York to Virginia. The gerhardi subspecies is listed as endangered in Connecticut.

The wingspan is 55–65 mm. Adults are on wing from July to August depending on the location. There is probably one generation per year.

The larvae feed on Quercus ilicifolia and Quercus rubra.

== Subspecies ==
- Catocala herodias herodias Strecker, 1876
- Catocala herodias gerhardi Barnes & Benjamin, 1927
