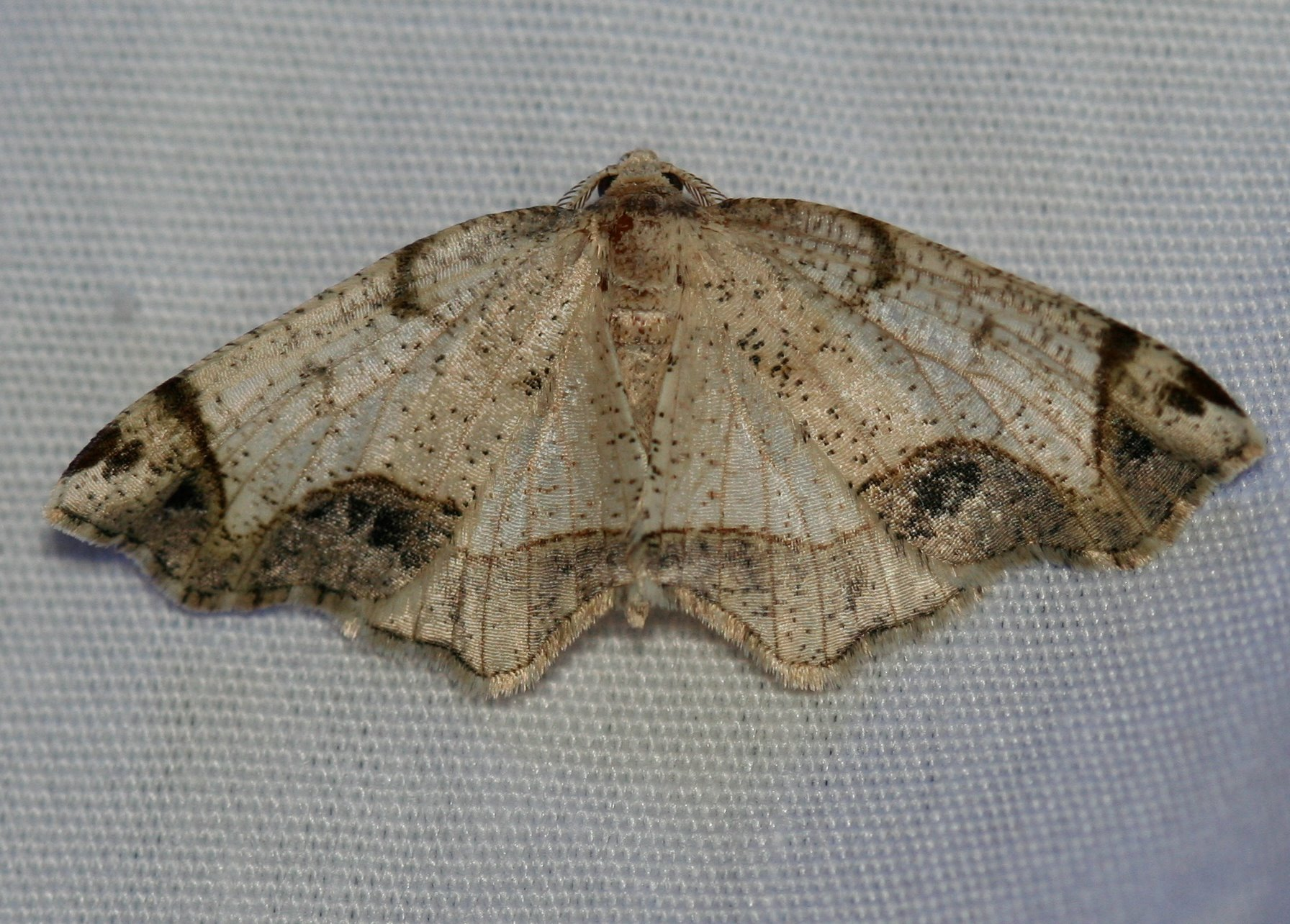

Scientific classification
- Domain: Eukaryota
- Kingdom: Animalia
- Phylum: Arthropoda
- Class: Insecta
- Order: Lepidoptera
- Family: Geometridae
- Genus: Probole
- Species: P. alienaria

Binomial name
- Probole alienaria Herrich-Schaffer, 1855

Synonyms
- Hyperetis amicaria nyssaria Guenée in Boisduval and Guenée, 1858; Hyperetis insinuaria (Guenée in Boisduval and Guenée, 1858); Hyperetis persinuaria (Guenée in Boisduval and Guenée, 1858); Hyperetis subsinuaria (Guenée in Boisduval and Guenée, 1858); Probole nyssaria (Guenée in Boisduval and Guenée, 1858)

= Probole alienaria =

Species of moth

Probole alienaria, the alien probole, is a species of geometrid moth in the family Geometridae. It is found in North America.

The MONA or Hodges number for Probole alienaria is 6837.
