= Coleophora astericola =

Scientific classification
- Kingdom: Animalia
- Phylum: Arthropoda
- Class: Insecta
- Order: Lepidoptera
- Family: Coleophoridae
- Genus: Coleophora
- Species: C. astericola

Binomial name
- Coleophora astericola Heinrich, 1920

Species of moth

Coleophora astericola is a moth of the family Coleophoridae. It is found in the United States, including Massachusetts.

The larvae feed on the leaves of Aster multiflorus. They create a tubular, bivalved silken case.
