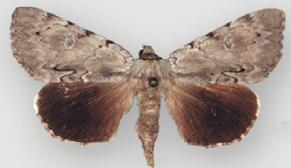

Scientific classification
- Kingdom: Animalia
- Phylum: Arthropoda
- Class: Insecta
- Order: Lepidoptera
- Superfamily: Noctuoidea
- Family: Erebidae
- Genus: Catocala
- Species: C. miranda

Binomial name
- Catocala miranda H. Edwards, 1881

Synonyms
- Catocala judith miranda

= Catocala miranda =

Miranda underwing

Species of moth

Catocala miranda, the Miranda underwing, is a moth of the family Erebidae. The species was first described by Henry Edwards in 1881. It is found in the US from Illinois, Pennsylvania and Massachusetts to Florida and west to western North Carolina.

The wingspan is 37–45 mm. Adults are on wing from May to June. There is probably one generation per year.

The larvae feed on Crataegus.
