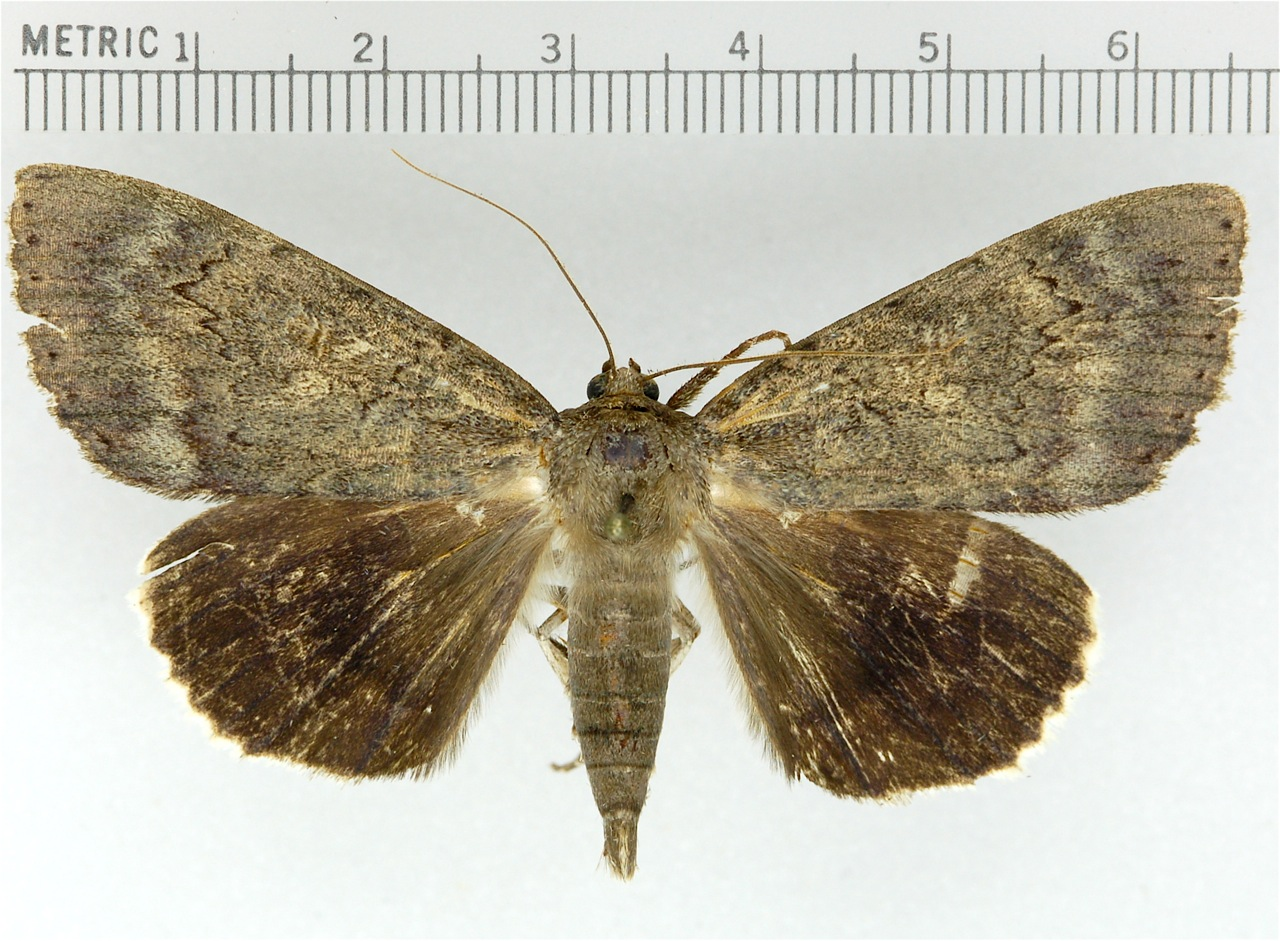

Scientific classification
- Kingdom: Animalia
- Phylum: Arthropoda
- Class: Insecta
- Order: Lepidoptera
- Superfamily: Noctuoidea
- Family: Erebidae
- Genus: Catocala
- Species: C. obscura

Binomial name
- Catocala obscura Strecker, 1873

Synonyms
- Catabapta obscura; Catocala simulatilis Grote, 1874; Catocala obvia Schwartz, 1919

= Catocala obscura =

Obscure underwing

Species of moth

Catocala obscura, the obscure underwing, is a moth of the family Erebidae. The species was first described by Ferdinand Heinrich Hermann Strecker in 1873. In Canada it is found in southern Quebec (where it is rare) and Ontario and in the United States it is found from Massachusetts and Connecticut south to North Carolina, west to Mississippi and north to Iowa, Illinois, Ohio, and Michigan.

The wingspan is 60–72 mm. Adults are on wing from July to October depending on the location.

The larvae feed on Carya glabra, Carya illinoinensis, Carya ovata, and Juglans nigra.
