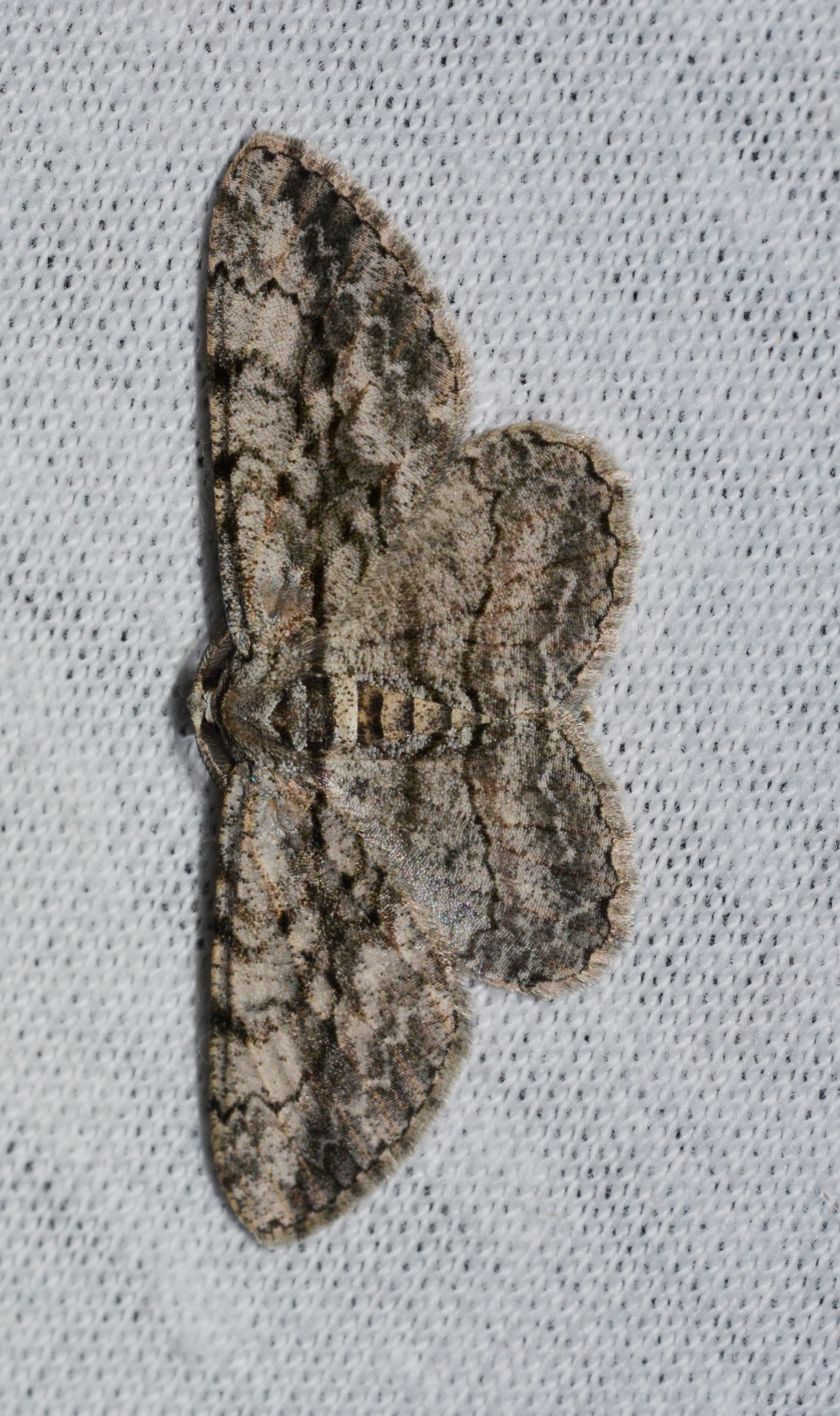

Scientific classification
- Kingdom: Animalia
- Phylum: Arthropoda
- Class: Insecta
- Order: Lepidoptera
- Family: Geometridae
- Tribe: Boarmiini
- Genus: Anavitrinella; McDunnough, 1922

Synonyms
- Vitrinella McDunnough, 1920

= Anavitrinella =

Genus of geometer moths

Anavitrinella is a genus of moths in the family Geometridae erected by James Halliday McDunnough in 1922.

== Species ==
- Anavitrinella addendaria (Grossbeck, 1908)
- Anavitrinella atristrigaria (Barnes & McDunnough, 1913)
- Anavitrinella ocularia (Barnes & McDunnough, 1917)
- Anavitrinella pampinaria (Guenée, 1857) - common gray
