= Ulolonche modesta =

Scientific classification
- Domain: Eukaryota
- Kingdom: Animalia
- Phylum: Arthropoda
- Class: Insecta
- Order: Lepidoptera
- Superfamily: Noctuoidea
- Family: Noctuidae
- Tribe: Eriopygini
- Genus: Ulolonche
- Species: U. modesta

Binomial name
- Ulolonche modesta (Morrison, 1874)

Species of moth

Ulolonche modesta, the modest Quaker, is a species of cutworm or dart moth in the family Noctuidae. It is found in North America.

The MONA or Hodges number for Ulolonche modesta is 10569.
