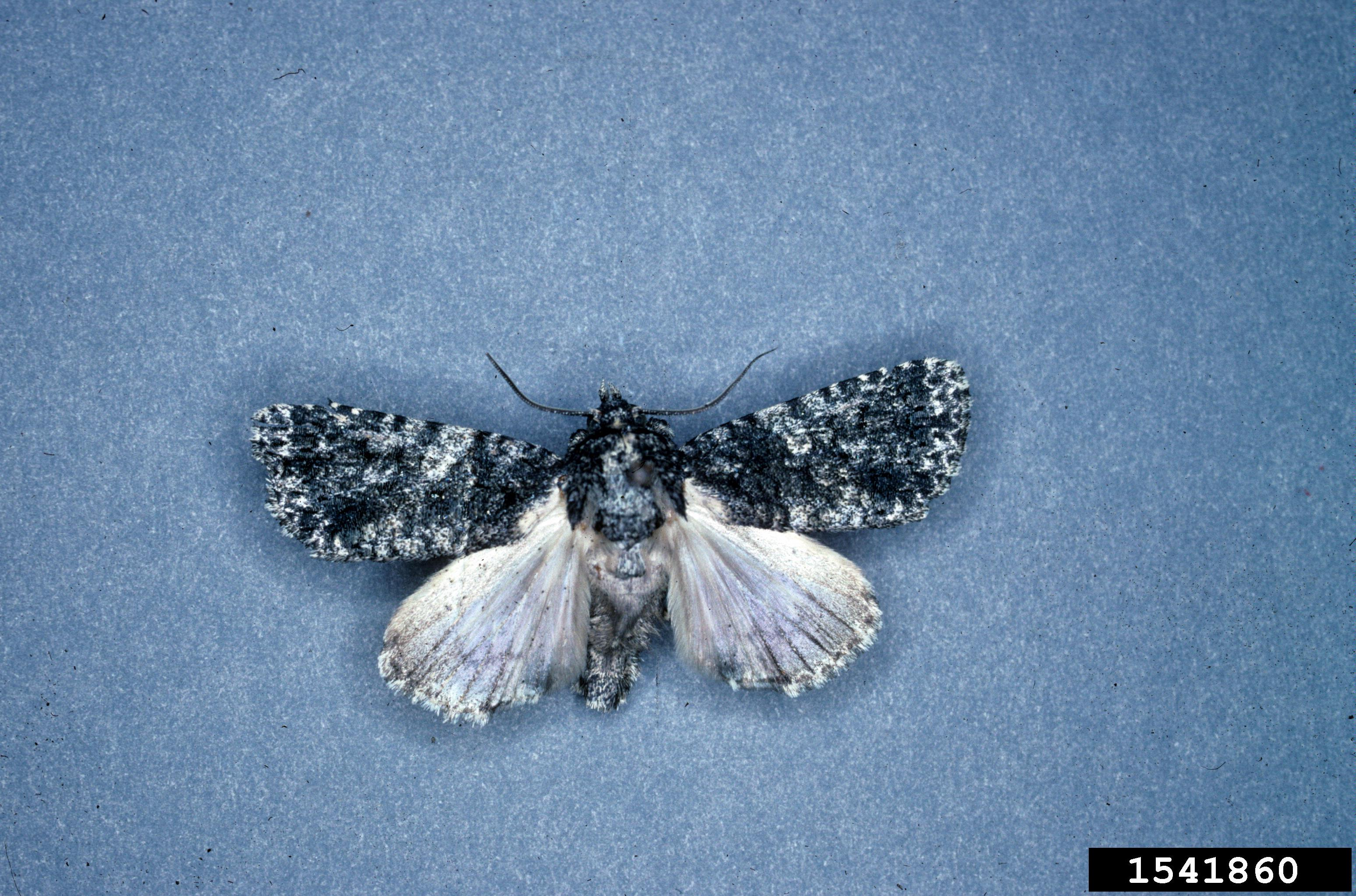

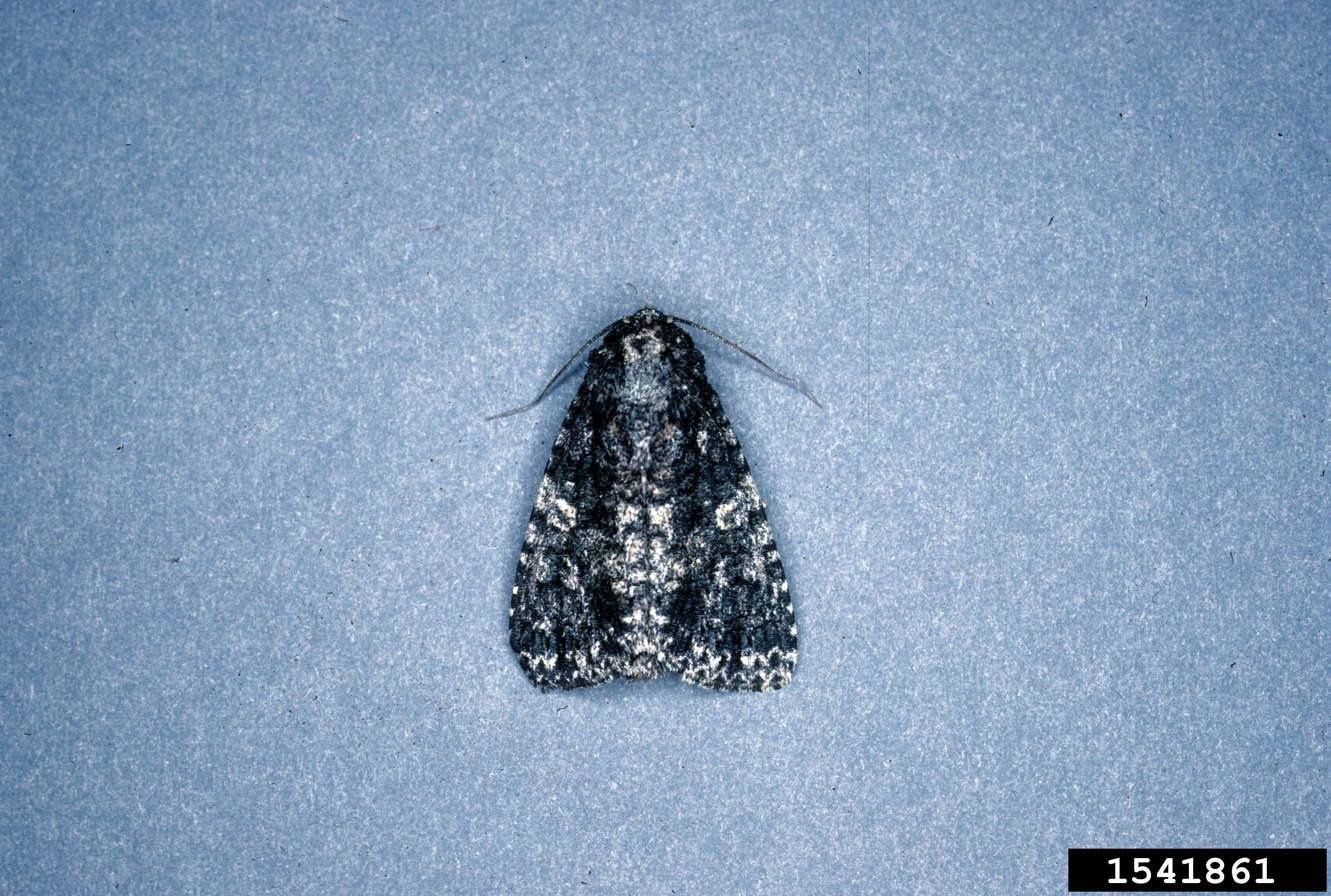

Scientific classification
- Kingdom: Animalia
- Phylum: Arthropoda
- Clade: Pancrustacea
- Class: Insecta
- Order: Lepidoptera
- Superfamily: Noctuoidea
- Family: Noctuidae
- Genus: Acronicta
- Species: A. afflicta

Binomial name
- Acronicta afflicta Grote, 1864

Synonyms
- Acronycta dolens; Acronicta schmalzriedi

= Acronicta afflicta =

Species of moth

Acronicta afflicta, the afflicted dagger moth, is a moth of the family Noctuidae. It is found in Canada (Nova Scotia, Quebec and Ontario), the United States (including Alabama, North Carolina, Oklahoma, Georgia, Maryland, New York and Ohio) as well as northern Mexico.

Illustration

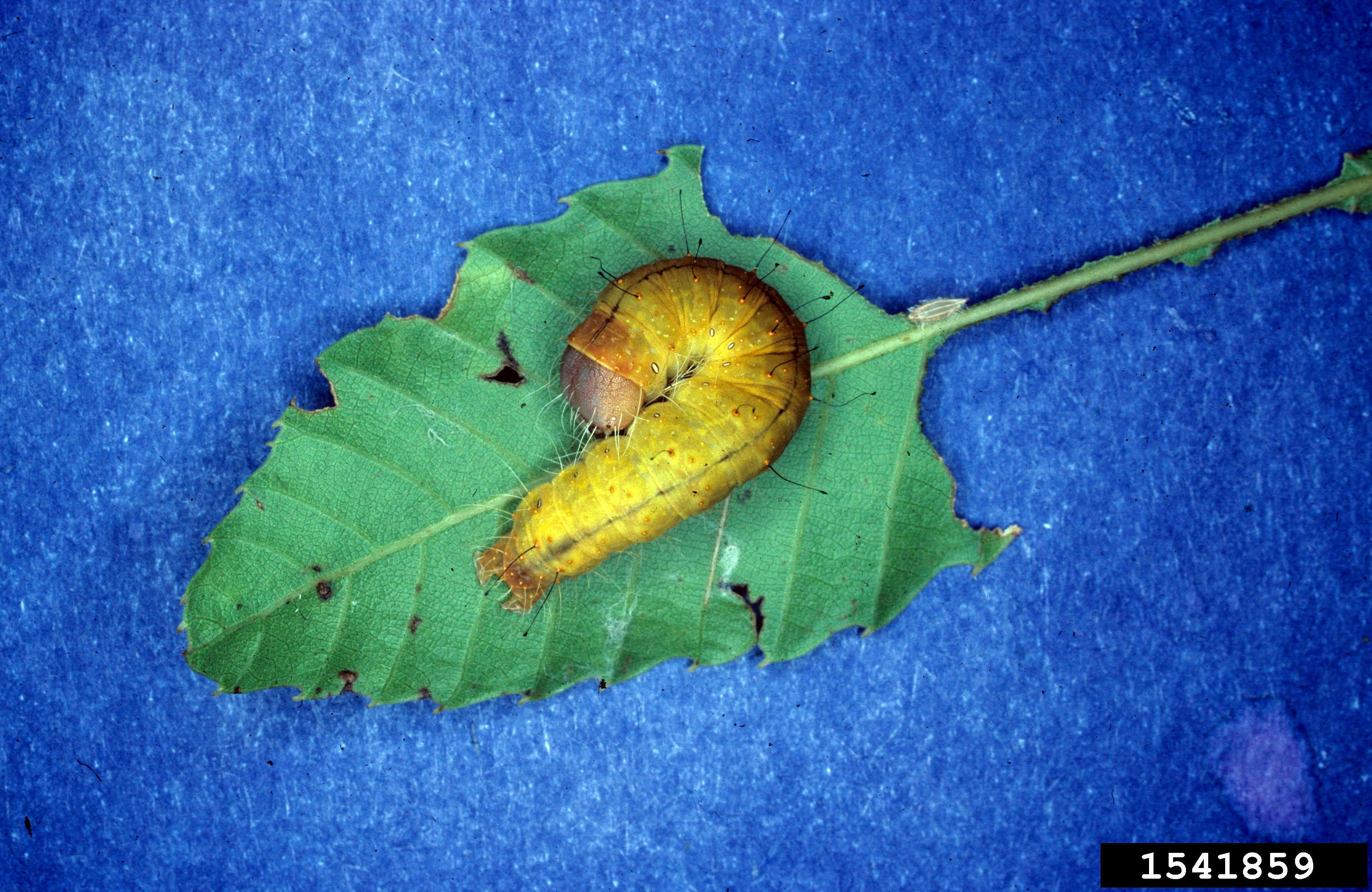
Larva

The wingspan is about 36 mm. Adults are on wing from May to September depending on the location.

The larvae feed on various Quercus species.
