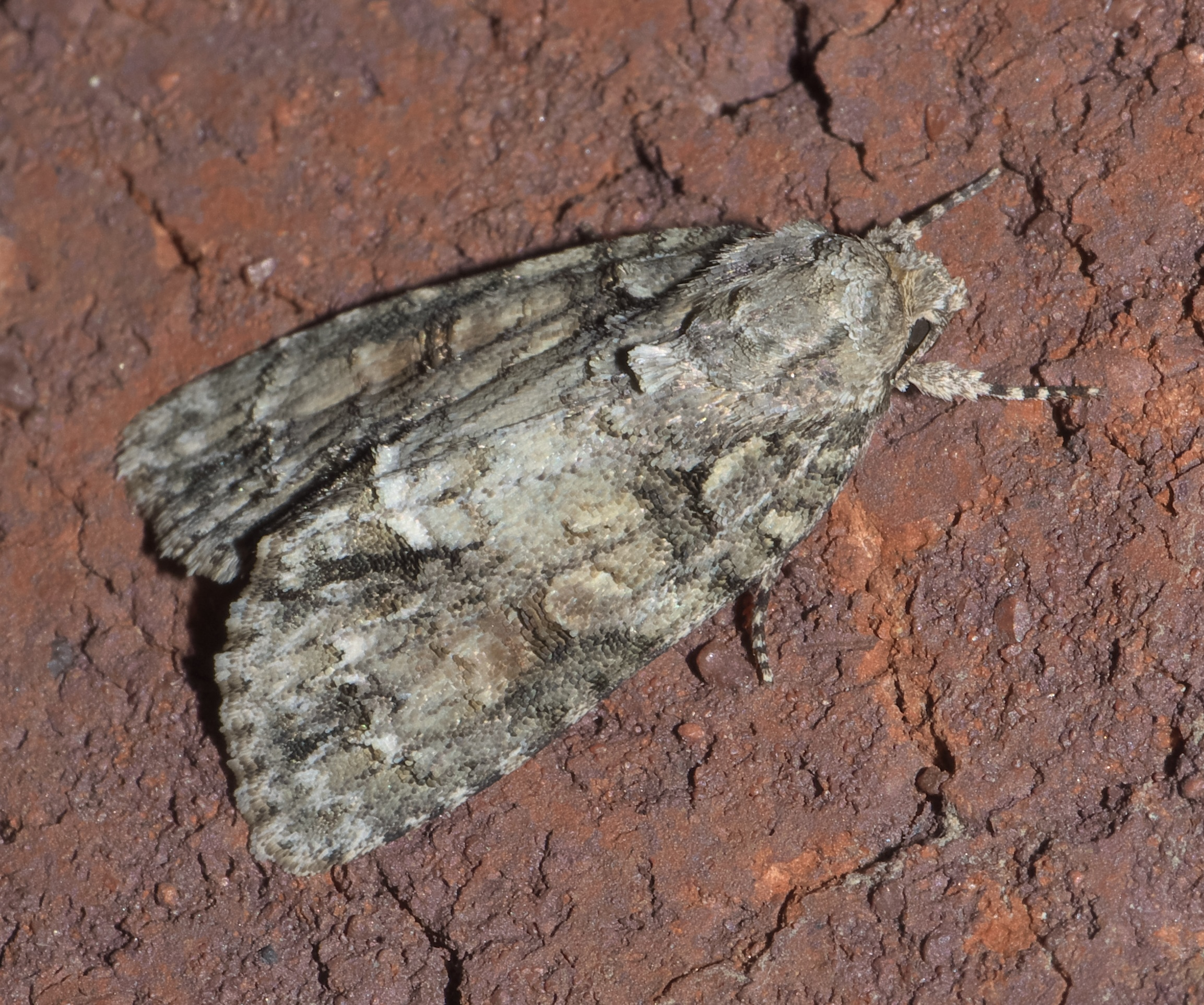
- Acronicta modica, hesitant dagger, Oklahoma

Scientific classification
- Kingdom: Animalia
- Phylum: Arthropoda
- Clade: Pancrustacea
- Class: Insecta
- Order: Lepidoptera
- Superfamily: Noctuoidea
- Family: Noctuidae
- Genus: Acronicta
- Species: A. modica

Binomial name
- Acronicta modica Walker, 1856

Synonyms
- Acronicta haesitata Grote, 1882

= Acronicta modica =

Species of moth

Acronicta modica, the hesitant dagger, is a moth of the family Noctuidae. It is found in eastern North America from Nova Scotia to Florida, west to Oklahoma and Texas.

The wingspan is around 35 mm. The larvae feed on Oak species.

The type specimen of Acronicta modica was recently determined to be Acronicta haesitata. Because of priorities of the species descriptions, this resulted in Acronicta modica, the medium dagger moth, being renamed Acronicta immodica, and Acronicta haesitata, the hesitant dagger moth, becoming Acronicta modica. Acronicta haesitata is now a taxonomic synonym of Acronicta modica.
