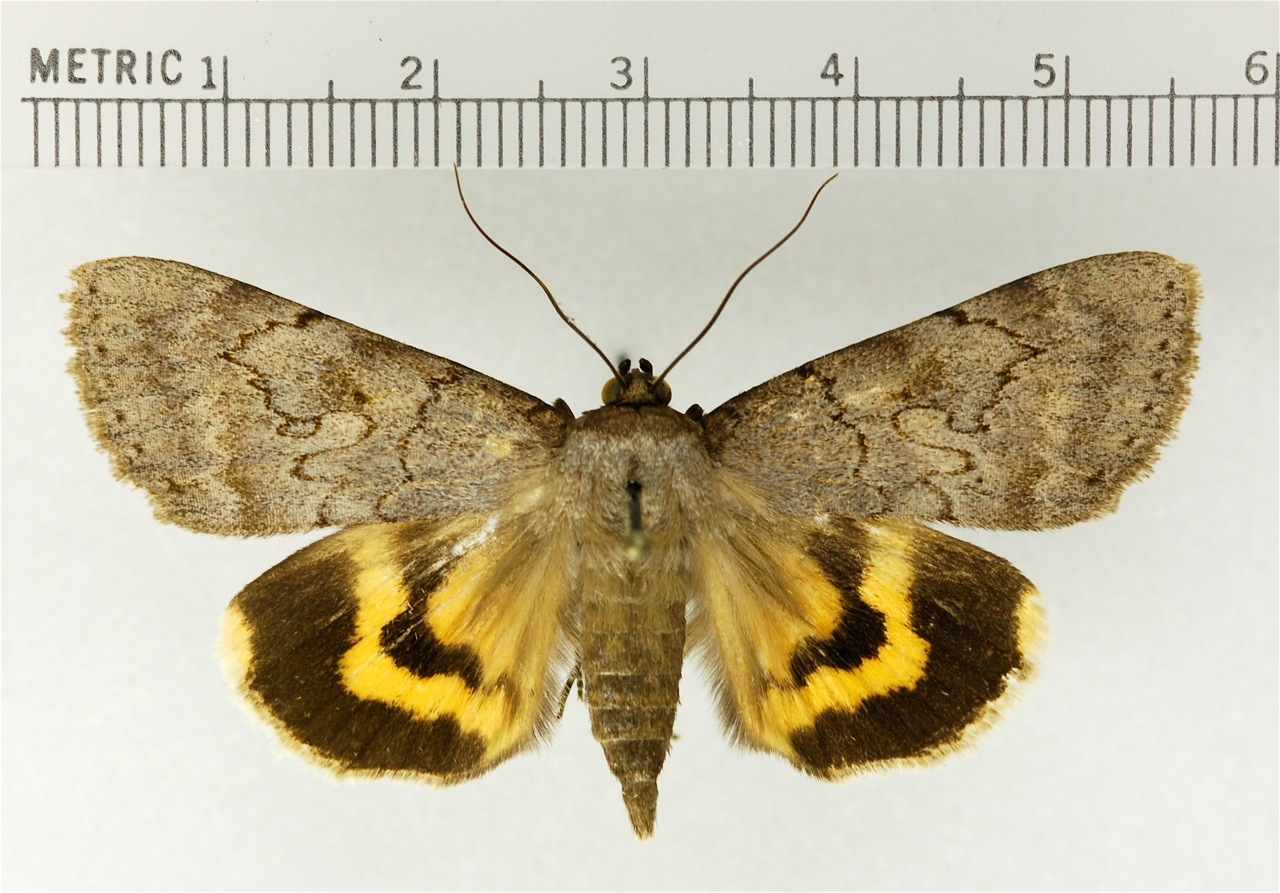

Scientific classification
- Kingdom: Animalia
- Phylum: Arthropoda
- Class: Insecta
- Order: Lepidoptera
- Superfamily: Noctuoidea
- Family: Erebidae
- Genus: Catocala
- Species: C. serena

Binomial name
- Catocala serena Edwards, 1864

Synonyms
- Catabapta serena

= Catocala serena =

Serene underwing

Species of moth

Catocala serena, the serene underwing, is a moth of the family Erebidae. It is found from southern Ontario, New York, New Jersey, Connecticut, as far south as to at least Tennessee, and west to Pennsylvania, Illinois and at least as far west as eastern Wisconsin.

The wingspan is 55–60 mm. Adults are on wing from July to September depending on the location. There is probably one generation per year.

The larvae feed on Carya ovata and Juglans nigra.
