= Acronicta inclara =

Scientific classification
- Kingdom: Animalia
- Phylum: Arthropoda
- Clade: Pancrustacea
- Class: Insecta
- Order: Lepidoptera
- Superfamily: Noctuoidea
- Family: Noctuidae
- Genus: Acronicta
- Species: A. inclara

Binomial name
- Acronicta inclara J. B. Smith, 1900

Species of moth

Acronicta inclara, the unclear dagger moth, is a moth of the family Noctuidae. The species was first described by John Bernhardt Smith in 1900. It is found in north-eastern North America.

== Subspecies ==
- Acronicta inclara inclara
- Acronicta inclara inconstans
