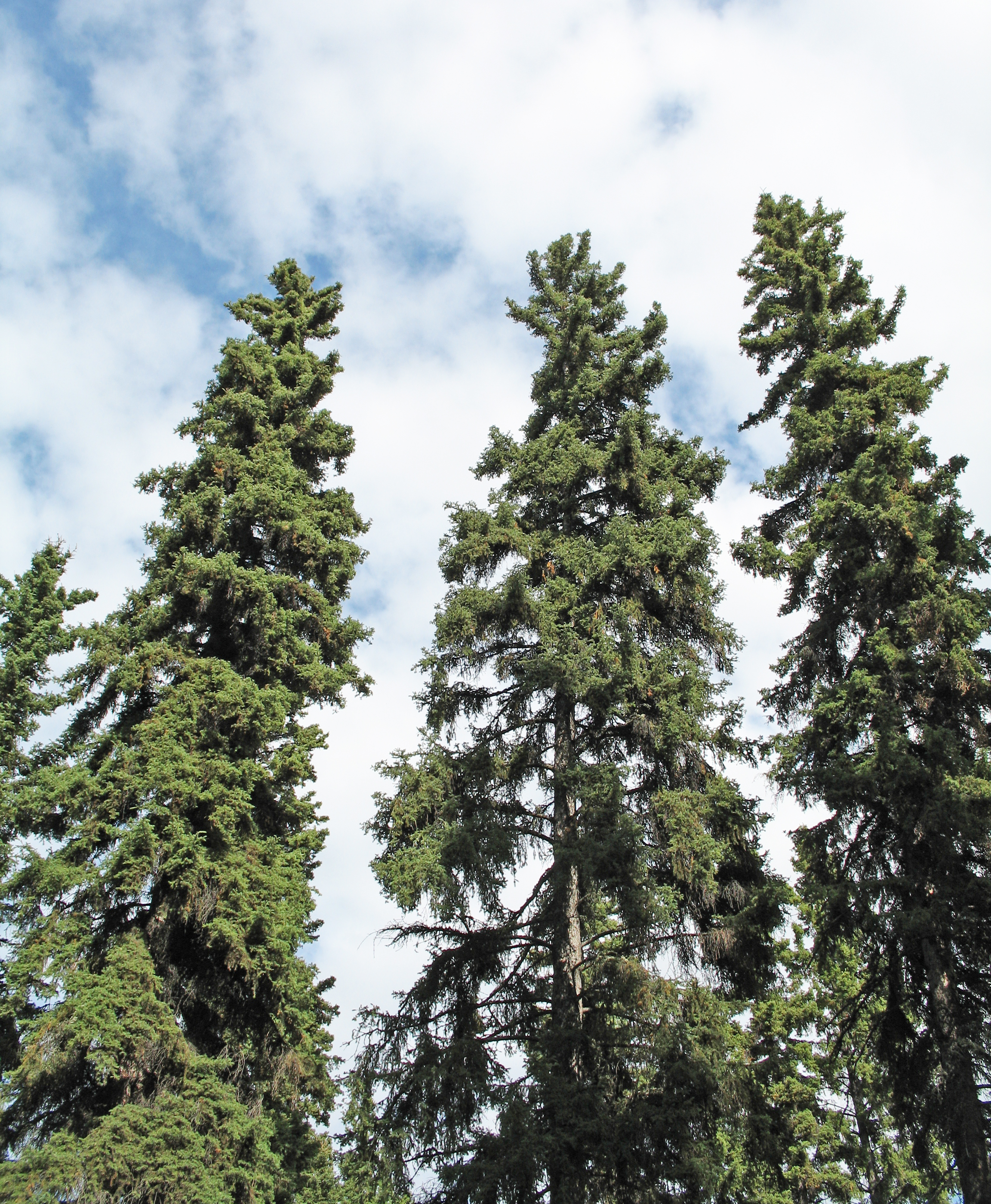
- Mature white spruce in Fairbanks, Alaska
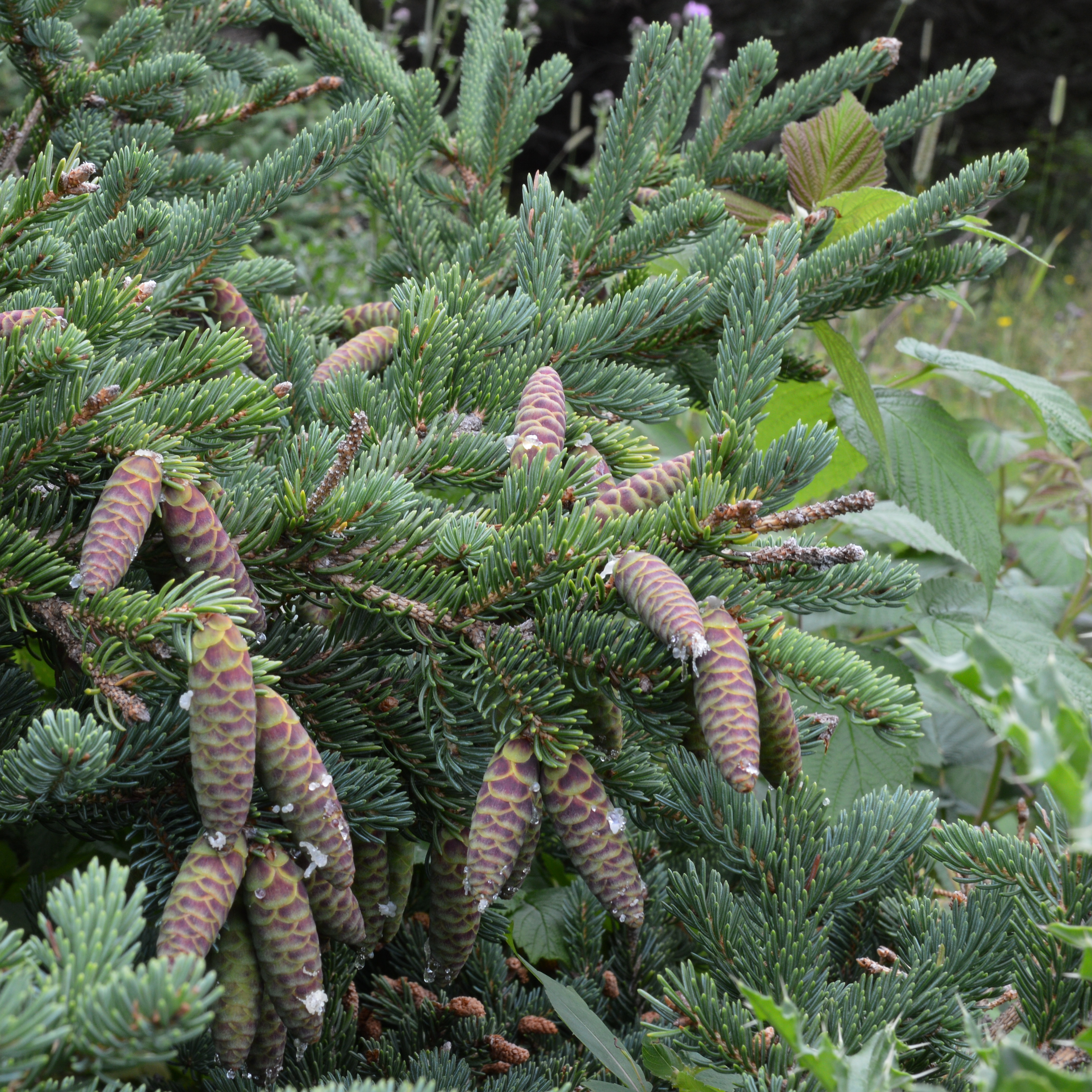
- Foliage and cones, Lark Harbour, Newfoundland

Conservation status
- Least Concern (IUCN 3.1)

- Secure (NatureServe)

Scientific classification
- Kingdom: Plantae
- Clade: Tracheophytes
- Clade: Gymnosperms
- Division: Pinophyta
- Class: Pinopsida
- Order: Pinales
- Family: Pinaceae
- Genus: Picea
- Species: P. glauca

Binomial name
- Picea glauca (Moench) Voss
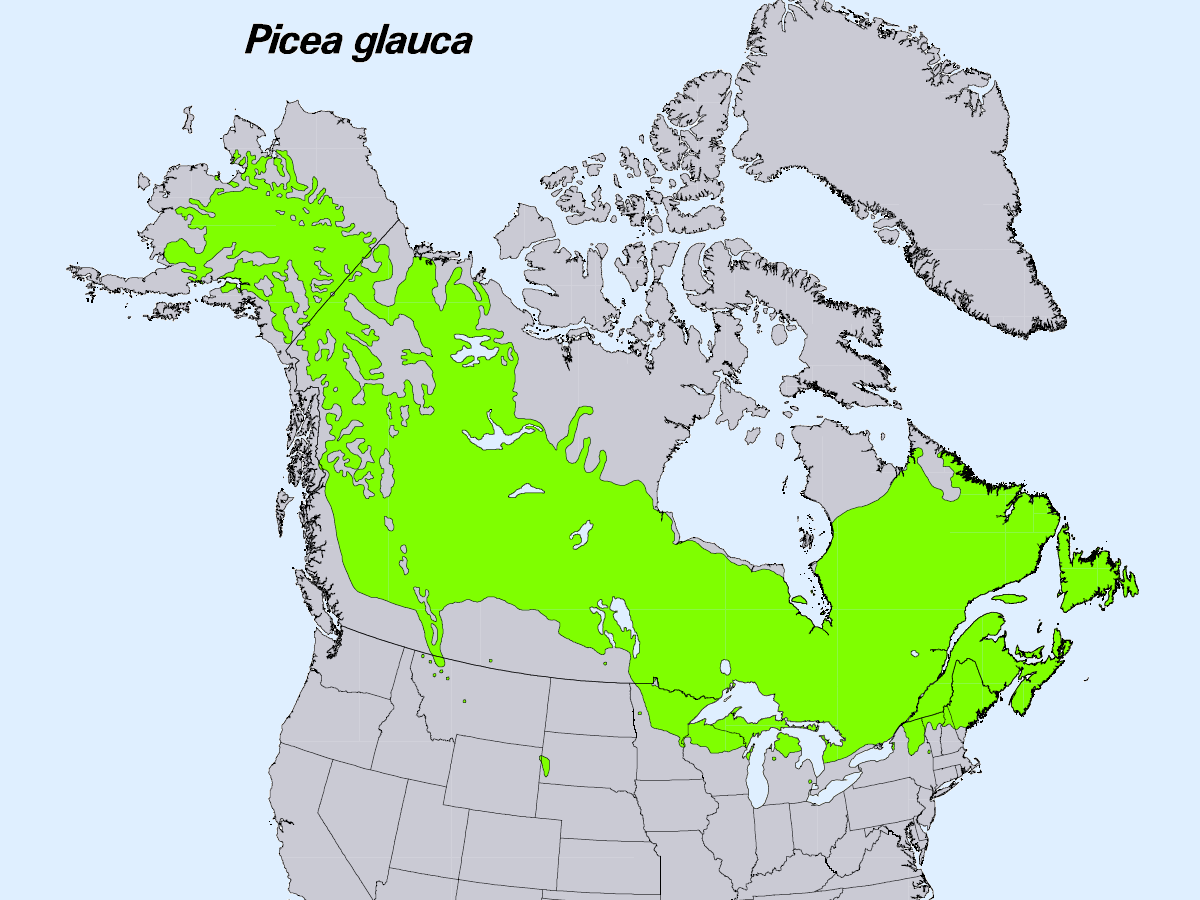
- Natural range (including Picea × albertiana)

Synonyms
- List: Abies alba (Aiton) Michx. nom. illeg.; Abies arctica A.Murray bis; Abies canadensis Mill.; Abies coerulea Lodd. ex J.Forbes; Abies laxa (Münchh.) K.Koch; Abies rubra var. violacea Loudon; Abies virescens R.Hinterh. & J.Hinterh.; Picea acutissima Beissn.; Picea alba (Aiton) Link; Picea canadensis (Mill.) Britton, Sterns & Poggenb. nom. illeg.; Picea coerulea (Lodd. ex J.Forbes) Link; Picea laxa Sarg.; Picea tschugatskoyae Carrière nom. inval.; Pinus abies var. laxa Münchh.; Pinus alba Aiton; Pinus canadensis Du Roi nom. illeg.; Pinus coerulea Lodd. ex Loudon nom. inval.; Pinus glauca Moench; Pinus laxa (Münchh.) Ehrh.; Pinus tetragona Moench; Pinus virescens Neilr. nom. inval.

= Picea glauca =

White spruce

Species of conifer

Genomic information
- NCBI ID: 3330
- Ploidy: 2
- Genome size: 20 Gbp
- Number of chromosomes: 12
- Year of completion: 2015
- Sequenced organelle: plastid and mitochondrion
- Organelle size: 123 kbp and 5.93 Mbp
- Year of completion: 2015

Picea glauca, the white spruce, is a species of spruce native to the northern temperate and boreal forests in Canada and United States, North America.

Picea glauca is native from west-central Alaska and east across western, southern/central and eastern Canada to the Avalon Peninsula in Newfoundland, and south to Montana, North Dakota, Minnesota, Wisconsin, Michigan, Upstate New York and Vermont, along with the mountainous and immediate coastal portions of New Hampshire and Maine, where temperatures are just barely cool and moist enough to support it. There is also an isolated population in the Black Hills of South Dakota and Wyoming. It is also known as Canadian spruce, skunk spruce, cat spruce, and in its varieties, Black Hills spruce, western white spruce, Alberta white spruce, and Porsild spruce.

== Description ==
White spruce is a medium-sized evergreen conifer which typically grows to 15 to 30 metres (50 to 100 ft) tall, with a trunk diameter of up to 1 m (3 ft 3 in). Citations of much greater heights, to 40–50 m, refer to the taller-growing tree previously treated as the western variety albertiana, but now treated separately as the hybrid Picea × albertiana. The bark is thin and scaly, flaking off in small circular plates 5 to 10 centimetres (2 to 4 in) across. The crown is narrow conical in young trees, becoming columnar with a conical top in older trees. The shoots are pale buff-brown, glabrous in the east of the range, but often pubescent in the west, and with prominent pulvini. The leaves are needle-like, mostly 8 to 13 mm (1/4 to 1/2 in) long, occasionally to 20 mm (3/4 in) or exceptionally even 25 mm (1 in), rhombic in cross-section, glaucous blue-green above (hence glauca), with several thin lines of stomata, and blue-white below with two broad bands of stomata.

The cones are pendulous, slender, cylindrical, 2.5 to 7 cm (1 to 2 3/4 in) long and 1.5 cm wide when closed, opening to 2.5 cm broad. They have thin, flexible scales 15 mm long with a smoothly rounded margin. They are green or reddish, maturing to pale brown 4 to 8 months after pollination. The seeds are black, 2 to 3 mm long, with a slender, tan wing 5 to 8 mm long.

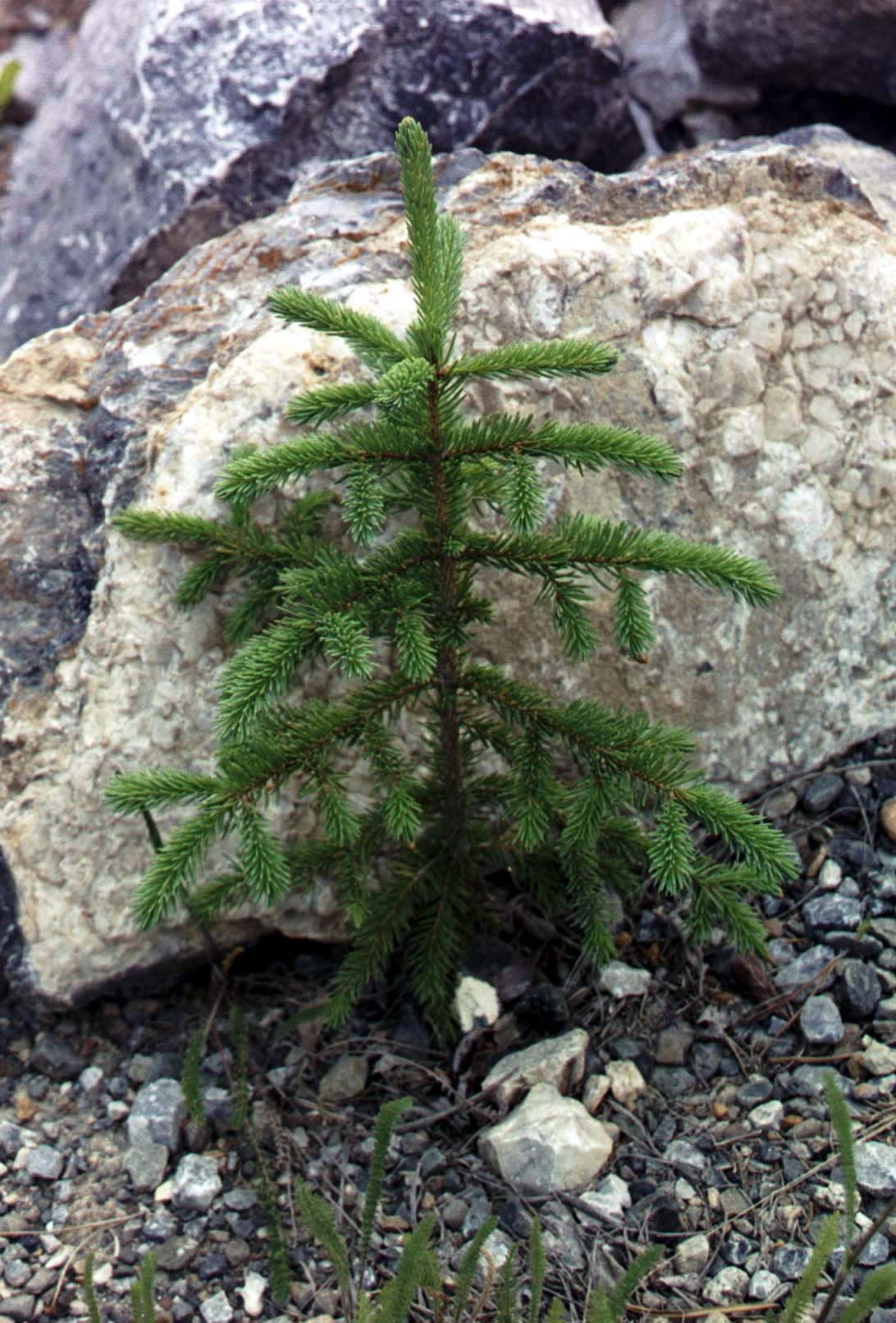
Young tree

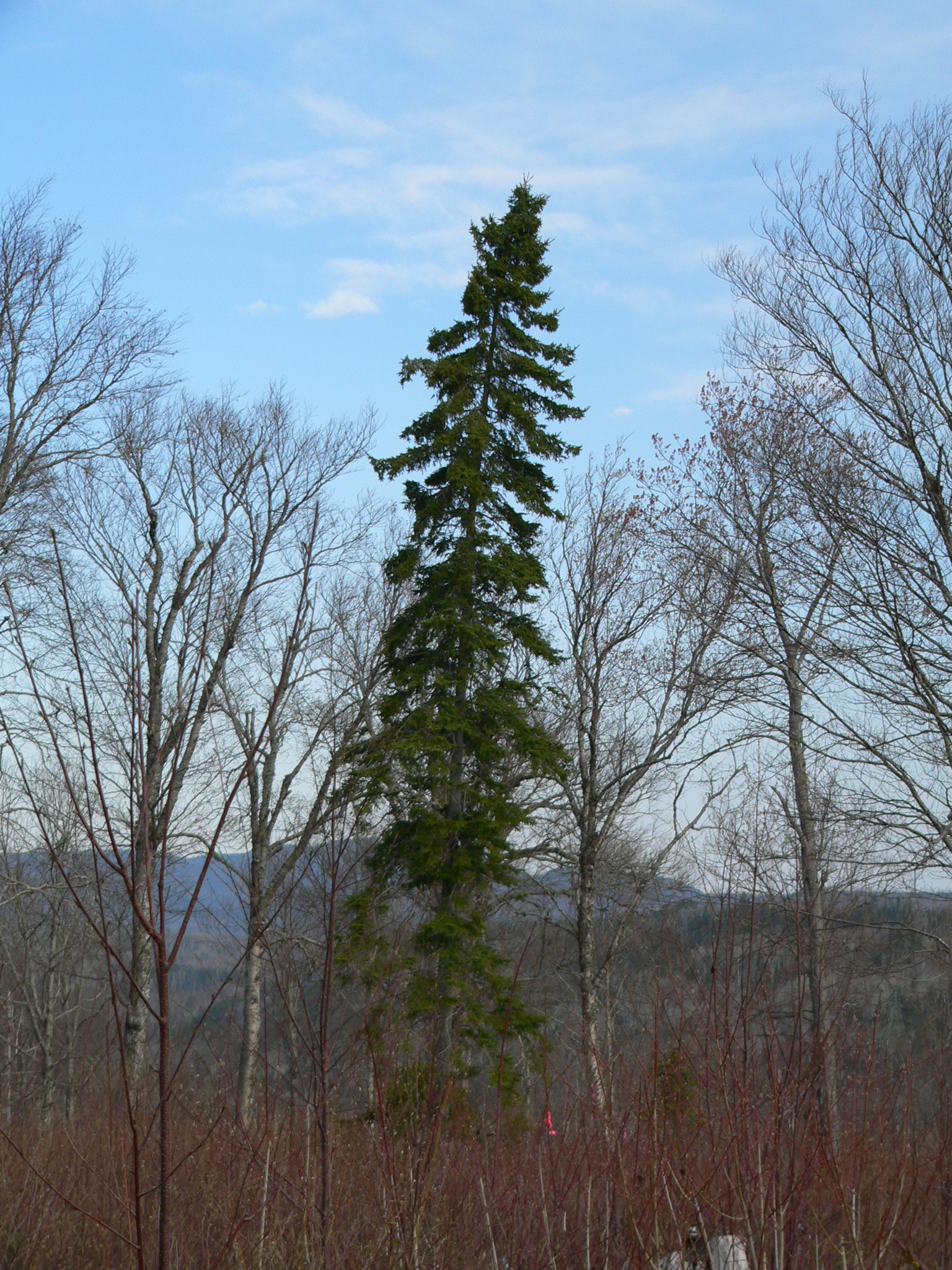
Mature tree

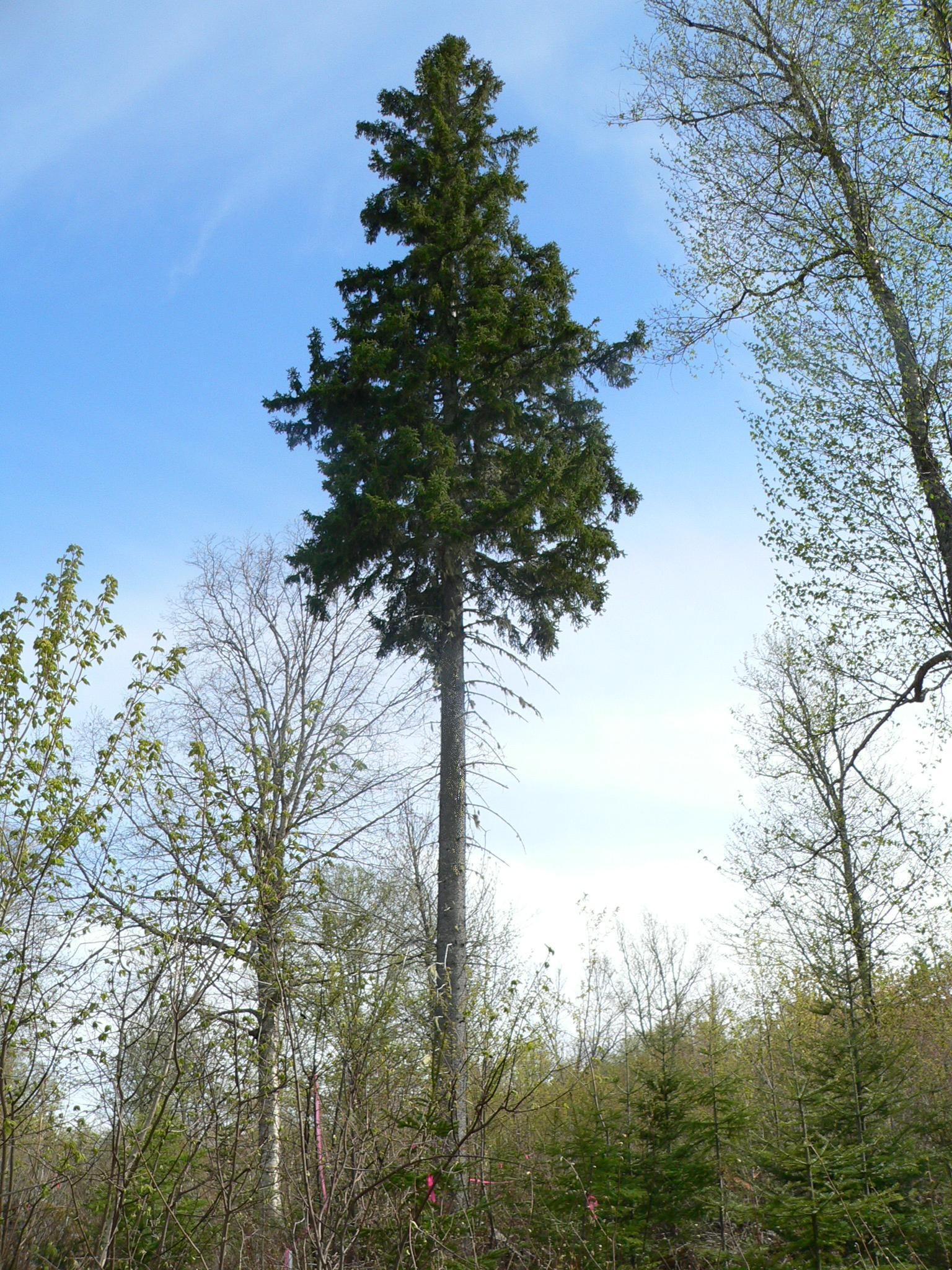
Mature tree sans lower branches

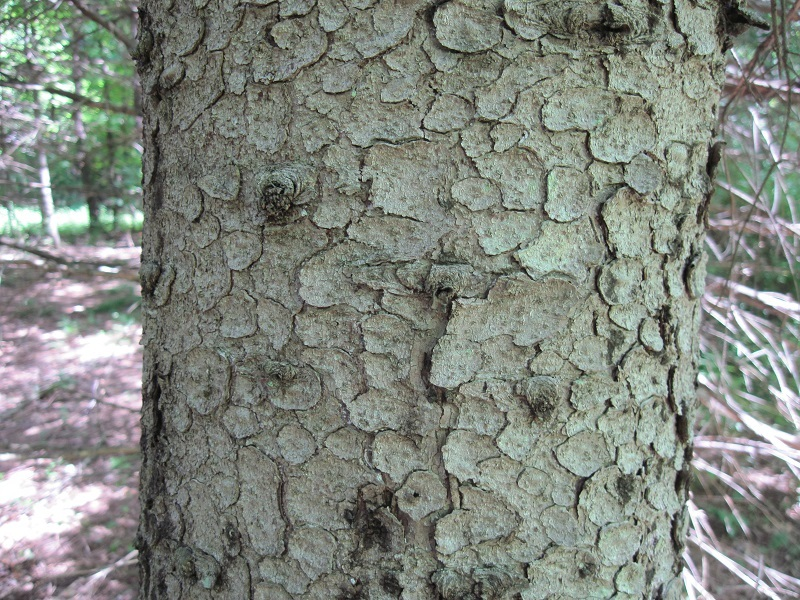
The bark is thin and scaly, flaking off in small roundish plates.

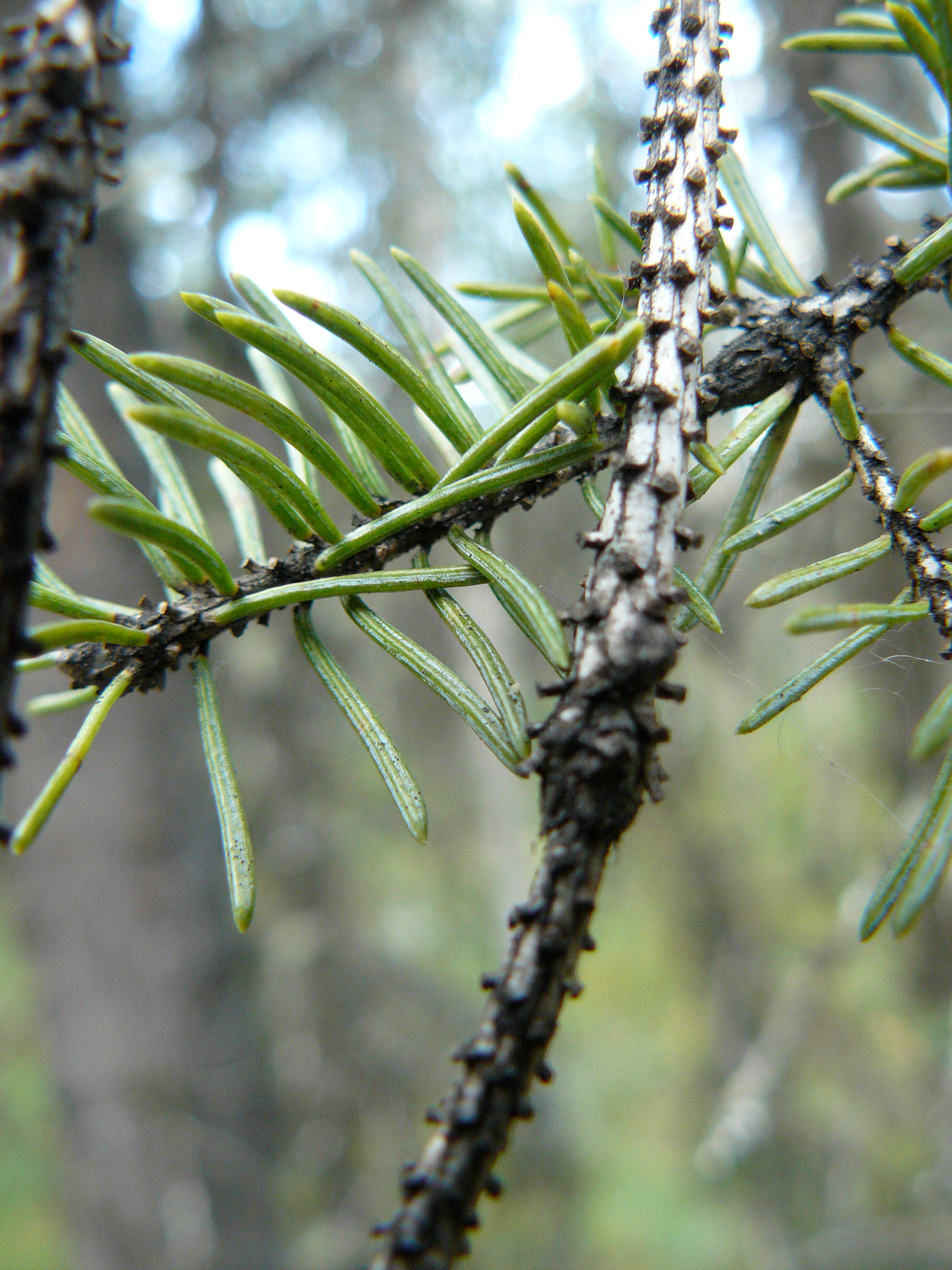
Twig with needles

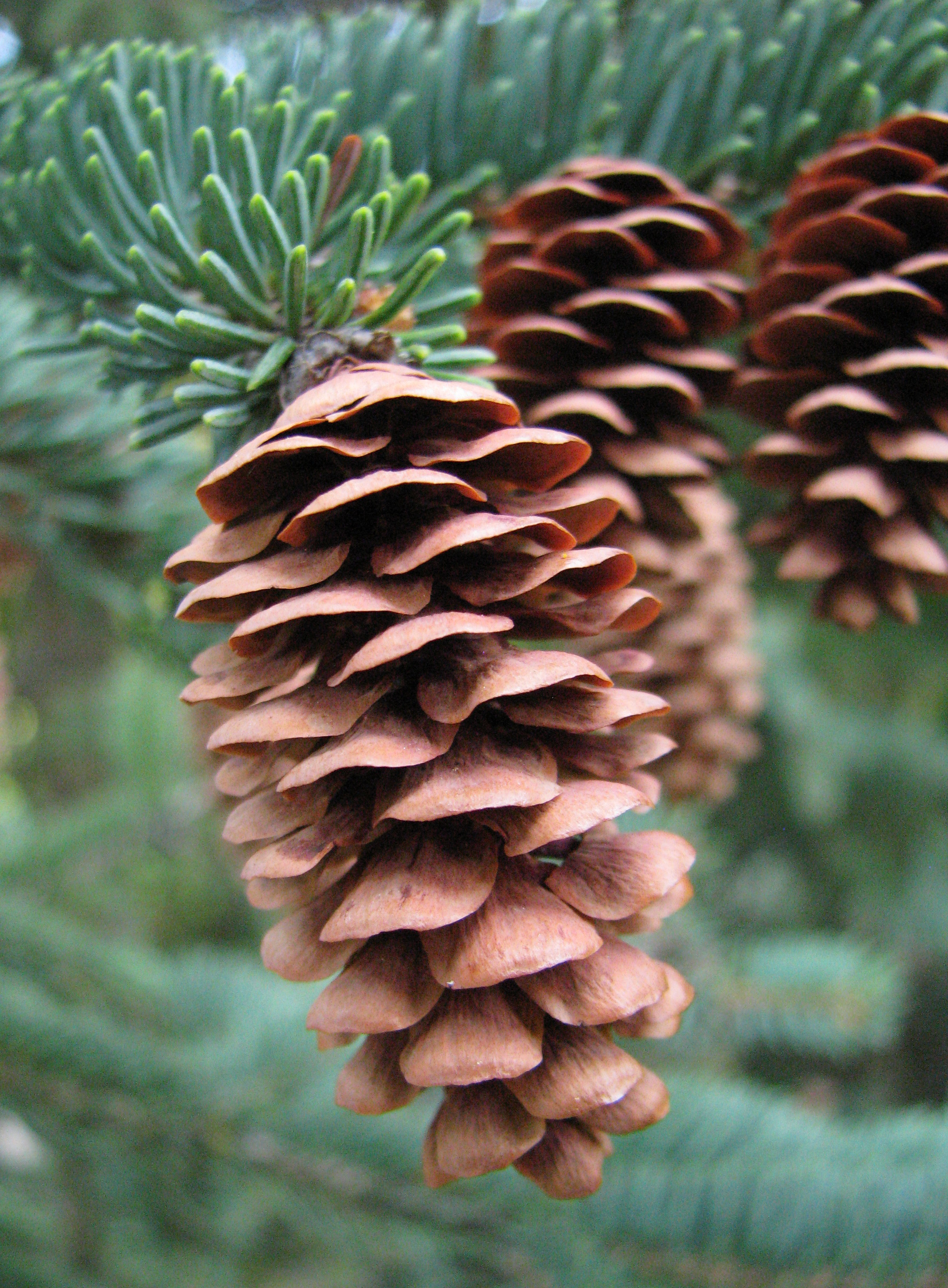
Mature female cone

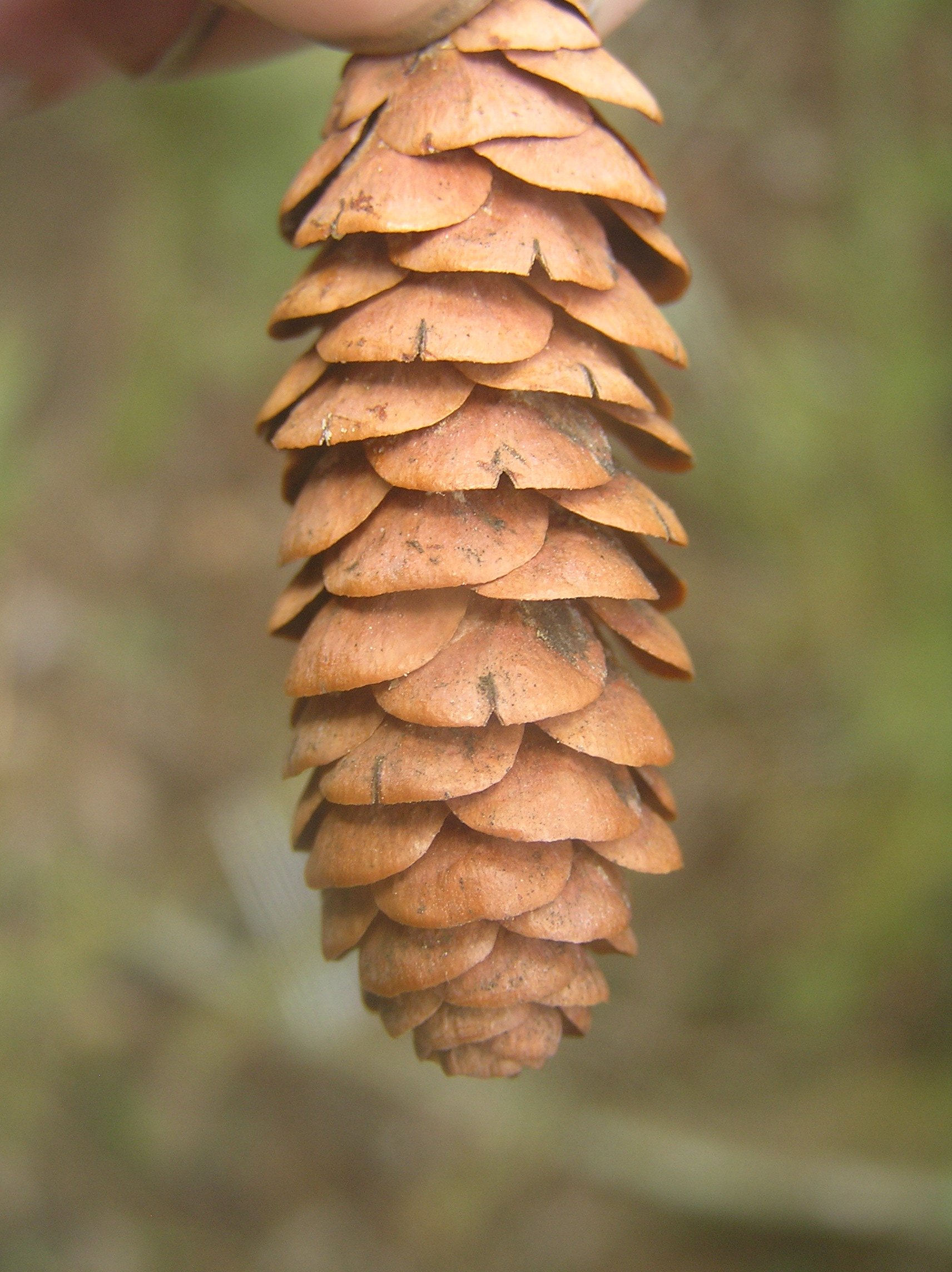
Female cone

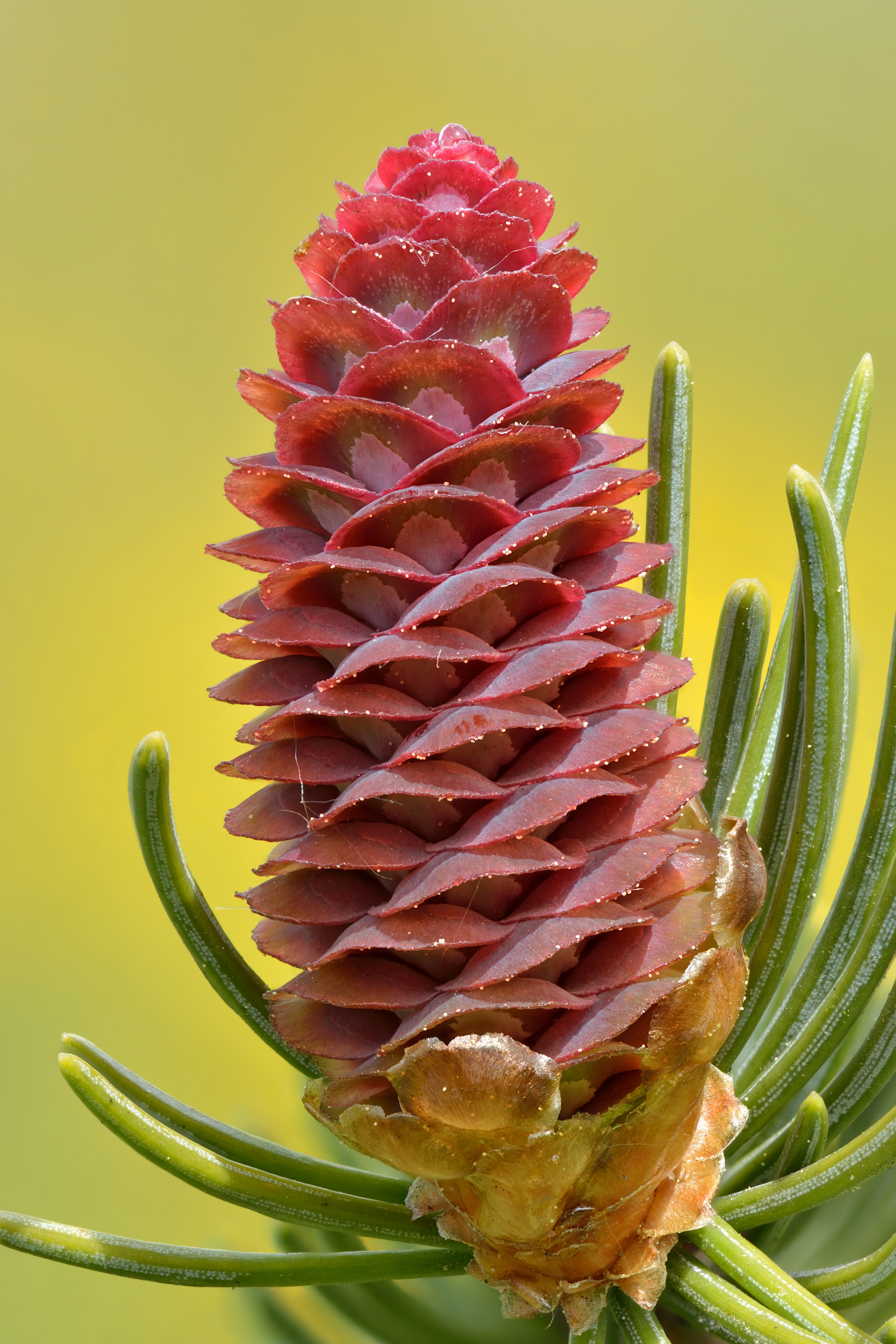
Young female cone

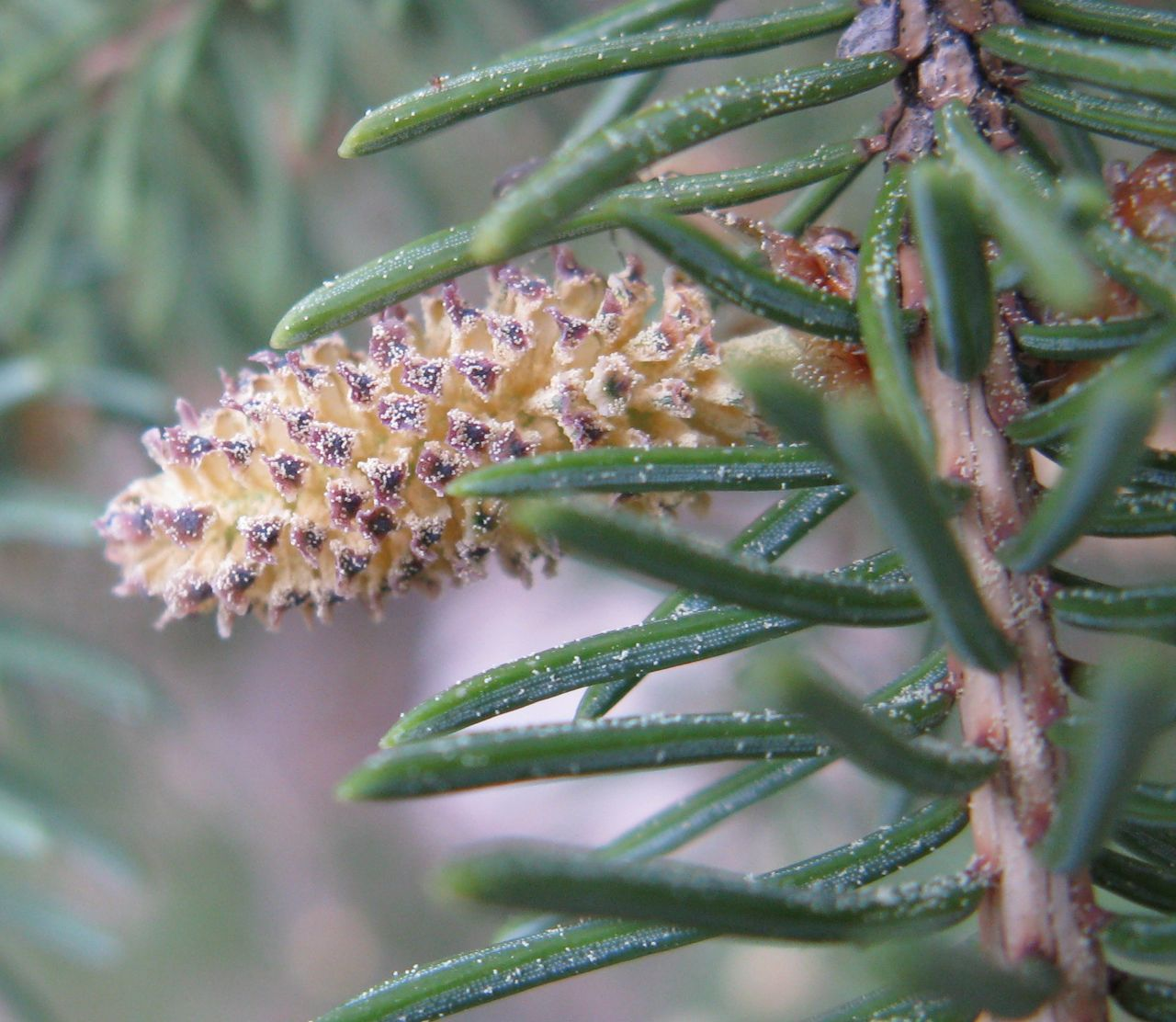
Male cone and pollen

=== Seeds ===
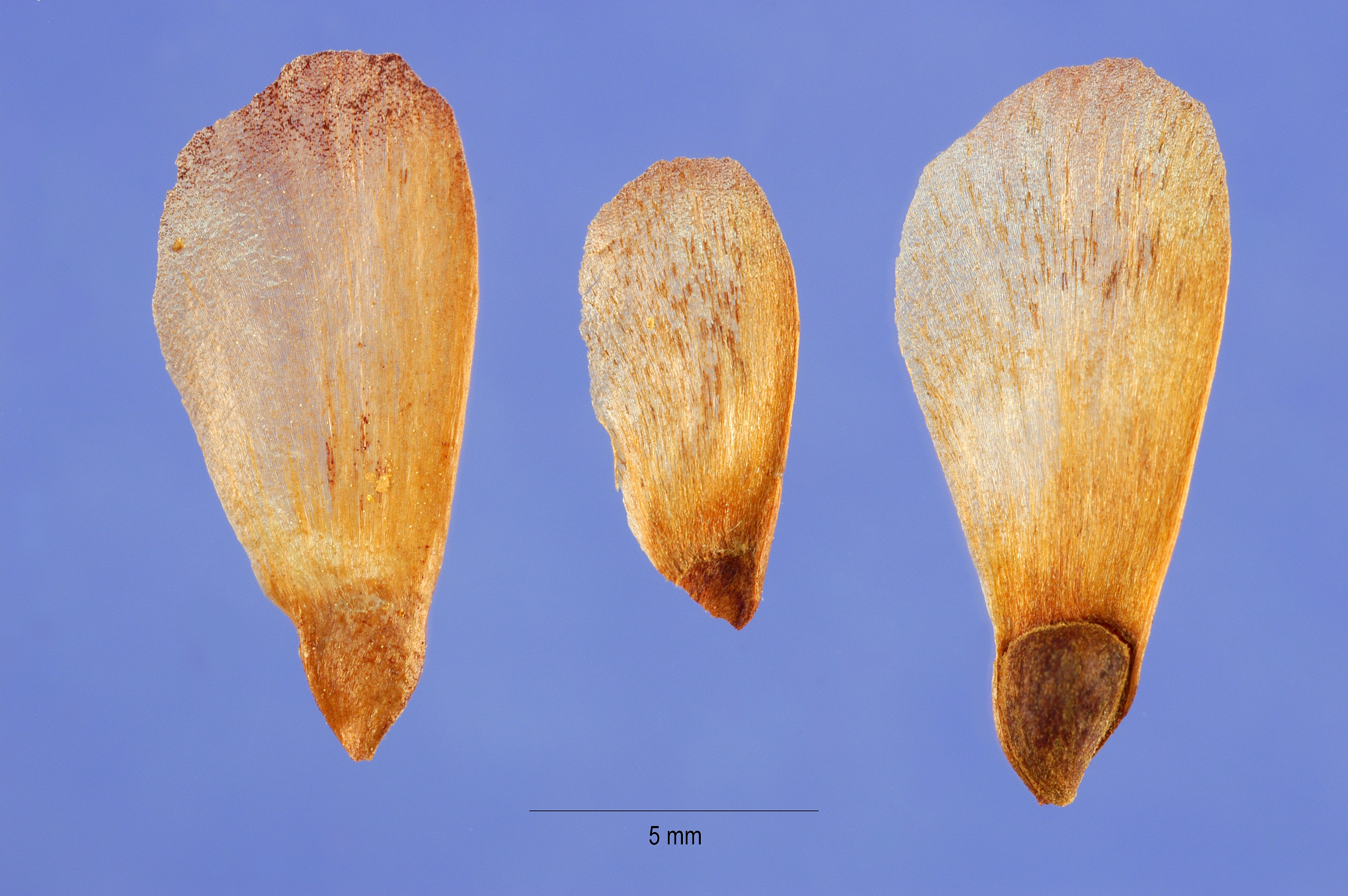
Seeds

The seeds are small, 2.5 to 5 mm (0.098 to 0.197 in) long, oblong, and acute at the base. Determinations of the average number of sound seeds per white spruce cone have ranged from 32 to 130.

Common causes of empty seed are lack of pollination, abortion of the ovule, and insect damage.

The average weight per individual seed varies from 1.1 to 3.2 mg (0.017 to 0.049 gr).

Each seed is clasped by a thin wing 2 to 4 times as long as the seed. Seed and wing are appressed to the cone scale. Embryo and megagametophyte are soft and translucent at first; later the endosperm becomes firm and milky white, while the embryo becomes cream-coloured or light yellow. At maturity, the testa darkens rapidly from light brown to dark brown or black. Mature seeds "snaps in two" when cut by a sharp knife on a firm surface.

White spruce cones reach their maximum size after 800 GDD. Cone moisture content decreases gradually after about 1000 GDD.

Cone colour also can be used to help determine the degree of maturation, though immature cones may be red, pink or green. Collection and storage dates and conditions influence germination requirements and early seedling growth.

1 imperial bushel (36 L), which may contain 6,500 to 8,000 cones, yields 6 to 20 ounces (170 to 570 g) of clean seed.

Seed dispersal begins after cone scales reflex with cone maturation in the late summer or early fall of the year of formation. Cones open at moisture contents of 45% to 70% and specific gravities of 0.6 to 0.8. Weather affects both the initiation and pattern of seed dispersal, but cone opening and the pattern of seed dispersal can vary among trees in the same stand. Even after dispersal has begun, cold, damp weather will cause cone scales to close; they will reopen during dry weather. Most seed falls early rather than late, but dispersal may continue through fall and winter and even into the next growing season. Seed dispersal occurs mainly in late summer or early fall.

White spruce seed is initially dispersed through the air by wind. Both the initiation and pattern of seed dispersal depend on the weather, but these can vary among trees in the same stand. Small amounts of white spruce seed are normally dispersed beyond 100 m from the seed source, but exceptionally seeds have been found more than 300–400 m from the nearest seed source.

=== Root system ===
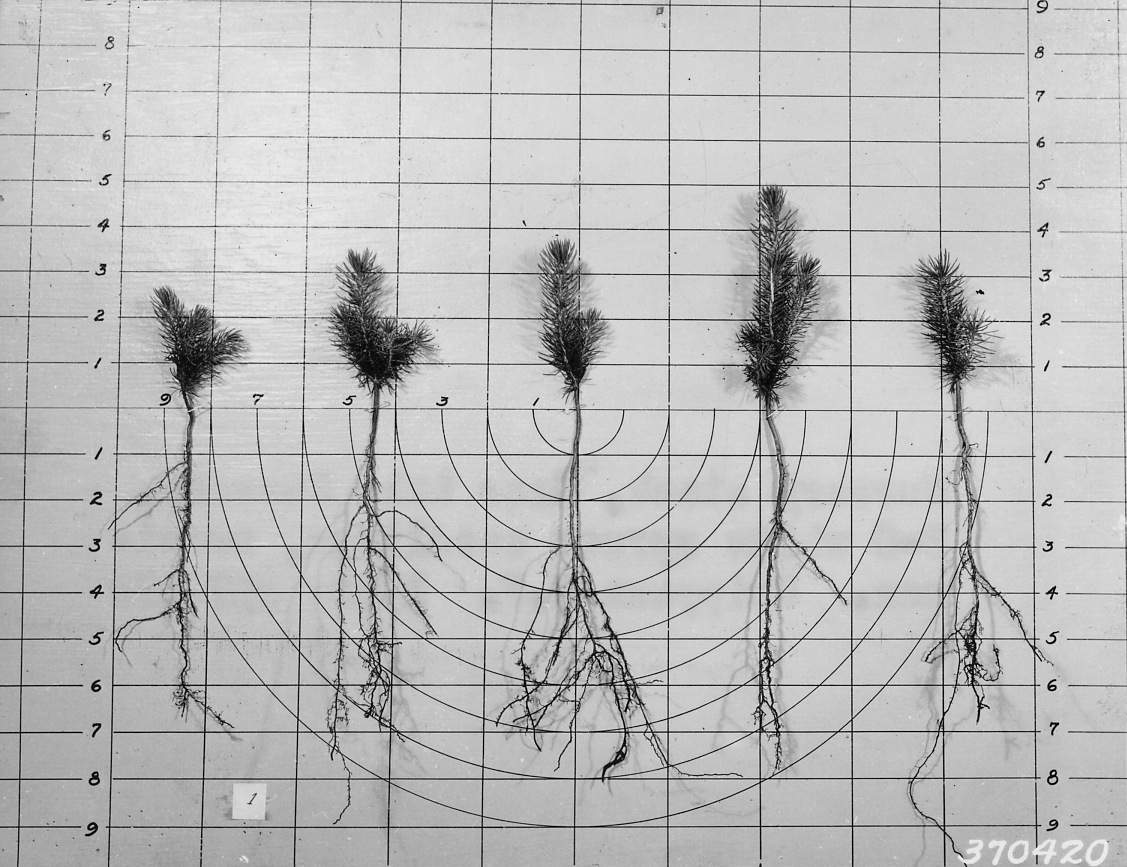
Nursery seedlings showing roots

The root system of white spruce is highly variable and adaptable, responding to a variety of edaphic factors, especially soil moisture, soil fertility, and mechanical impedance. On soils that limit rooting depth, the root system is plate-like, but it is a common misconception to assume that white spruce is genetically constrained to develop plate-like root systems irrespective of soil conditions. In the nursery, or naturally in the forest, white spruce usually develops several long 'running' roots just below the ground surface.

The structure of the tracheids in the long lateral roots of white spruce varies with soil nitrogen availability.

=== Stem ===
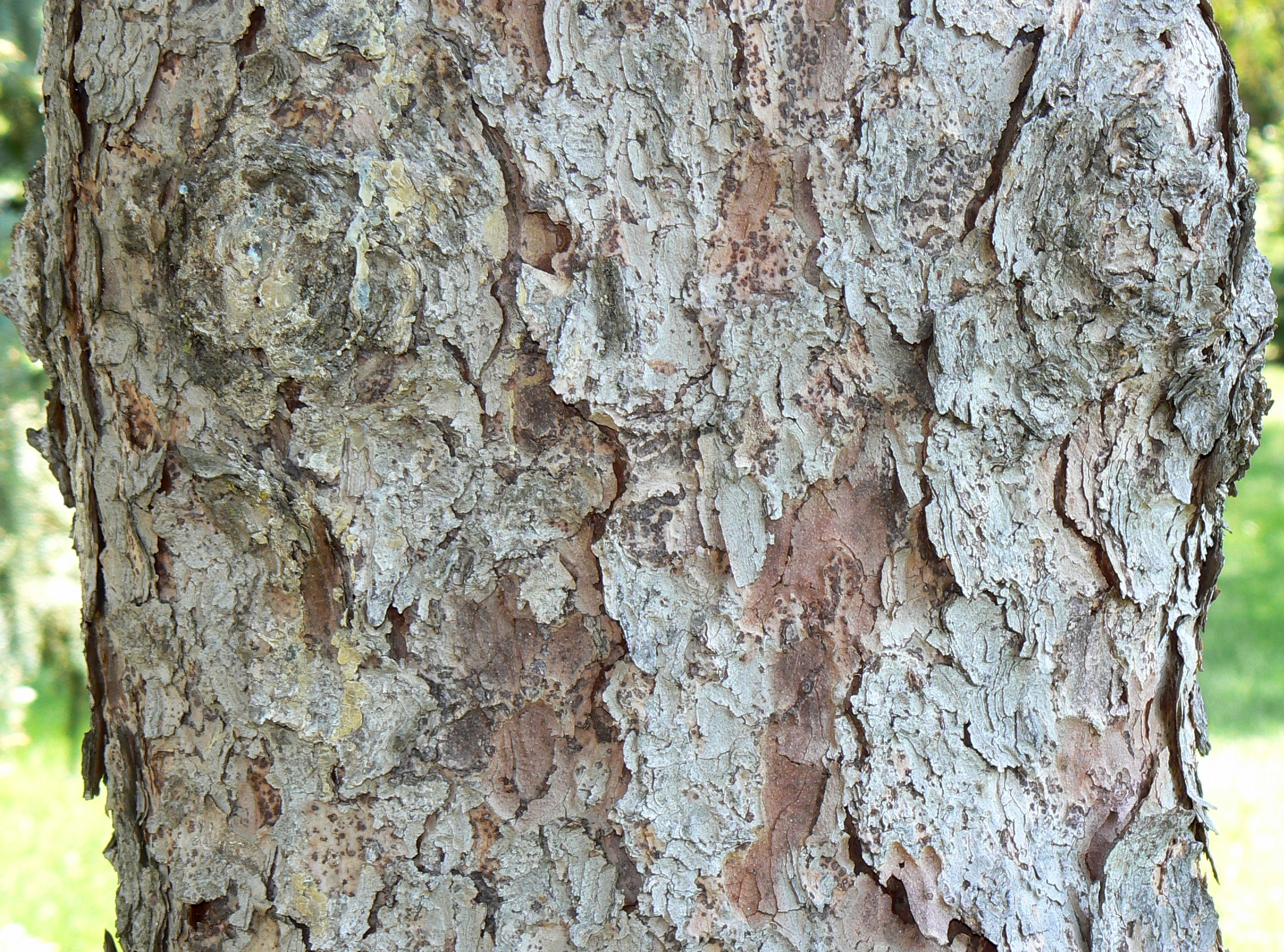
Trunk; bark is scaly or flaky and grey-brown.

White spruce can live for several hundred years, with an estimated average lifespan of 250 to 300 years.

Slow-growing trees in rigorous climates are also capable of great longevity. White spruce 6 to 10 m (20 to 33 ft) high on the shore of Urquhart Lake, Northwest Territories, were found to be more than 300 years old.

=== Bark ===
The bark of mature white spruce is scaly or flaky, grey-brown or ash-brown, but silvery when freshly exposed. Resin blisters are normally lacking, but the Porsild spruce Picea glauca var. porsildii Raup has been credited with having smooth resin-blistered bark.

White spruce bark is mostly less than 8 mm and not more than 9.5 mm thick.

=== Chemistry ===
Isorhapontin can be found in spruce species such as the white spruce.

P. glauca has three different genomes; a nuclear genome, a mitochondrial genome, and a plastid (i.e. chloroplast) genome. The large (20 Gbp) nuclear genome of P. glauca (genotype WS77111) was published in 2015, and the organellar (plastid and mitochondrial) genomes (genotype PG29) were published in SD Jackman et al. 2015. The plastid genome of P. glauca (genotype WS77111) has also been published.

== Varieties ==
Four geographical varieties have been described, but not all are accepted as distinct by all authors. These comprise, from northeast to southwest:

- Picea glauca var. glauca (typical or eastern white spruce) — Newfoundland west to eastern Alberta, on lowland plains.
- Picea glauca var. porsildii (Alaska white spruce) — Alaska and Yukon. Often considered a synonym of var. glauca.
- Picea glauca var. densata (Black Hills white spruce) — the Black Hills in South Dakota.
- Picea glauca var. albertiana (Alberta white spruce) — the Rocky Mountains in Alberta, British Columbia and northwest Montana. Now considered to be a natural hybrid with the closely related Engelmann spruce (P. engelmannii), as Picea × albertiana

The western populations are distinguished by pubescent shoots. This pubescence may be related to the extensive hybridisation and intergradation with the closely related Engelmann spruce found further south in the Rocky Mountains, with which it forms the nothospecies Picea × albertiana, but pubescence is also present in var. porsildii. White spruce also hybridises readily with the closely related Sitka spruce where they meet in southern Alaska and northwestern British Columbia; this hybrid is known as Picea × lutzii.

== Distribution and habitat ==
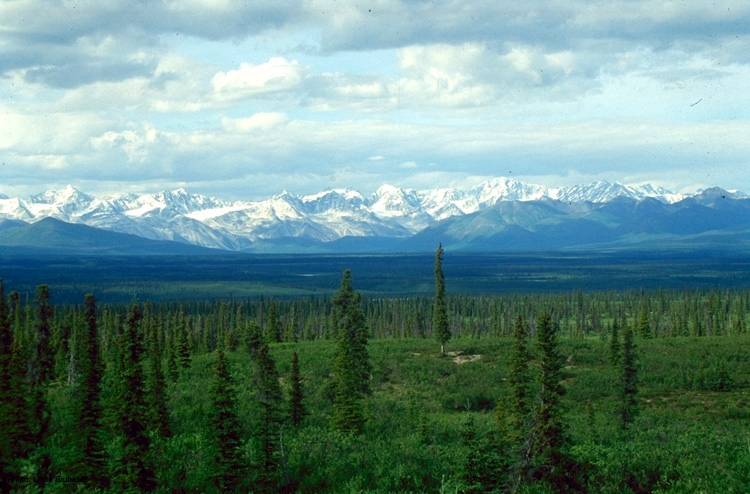
White spruce taiga along the Denali Highway in the Alaska Range; white spruce in Alaska grows even more northerly than this, partly due to the oceanic Alaska Current

White spruce has a transcontinental range in North America. In Canada, its contiguous distribution encompasses virtually the whole of the Boreal, Subalpine, Montane, Columbia, Great Lakes–St. Lawrence, and Acadian Forest Regions, extending into every province and territory. On the west coast of Hudson Bay, it extends to Seal River, about 59°N, "from which the northward limit runs apparently almost directly north-west to near the mouth of the Mackenzie River, or about latitude 68°". Collins and Sumner reported finding white spruce within 13 km of the Arctic coast in the Firth Valley, Yukon, at about 69°30′ N, 139°30′ W. It reaches within 100 km of the Pacific Ocean in the Skeena Valley, overlapping with the range of Sitka spruce (Picea sitchensis), and almost reaching the Arctic Ocean at latitude 69° N in the District of Mackenzie, with white spruce up to 15 m high occurring on some of the islands in the Delta near Inuvik. The wide variety of ecological conditions in which four Quebec conifers, including white spruce, are able to establish themselves, was noted by Lafond, but white spruce was more exacting than black spruce. In the United States, the range of white spruce extends into Maine, Vermont, New Hampshire, New York, Michigan, Wisconsin, Minnesota, and Alaska, where it reaches the Bering Strait in 66°44′ N" at Norton Bay and the Gulf of Alaska at Cook Inlet.

Southern outliers have been reported in southern Saskatchewan and the Cypress Hills of southwestern Saskatchewan and southeastern Alberta, northwestern Montana, south-central Montana, in the Black Hills on the Wyoming–South Dakota boundary, on the Manitoba–North Dakota boundary, and at Shushan, New York.

White spruce is the northernmost tree species in North America, reaching just north of 69°N latitude in the Mackenzie River delta. It grows between sea level and an elevation of 1,520 m (4,990 ft). Its northern distribution roughly correlates to the location of the tree line, which includes an isothermic value of 10 °C (50 °F) for mean temperature in July, as well as the position of the Arctic front; cumulative summer degree days, mean net radiation, and the amount of light intensities also figure. White spruce is generally found in regions where the growing season exceeds 60 days annually.

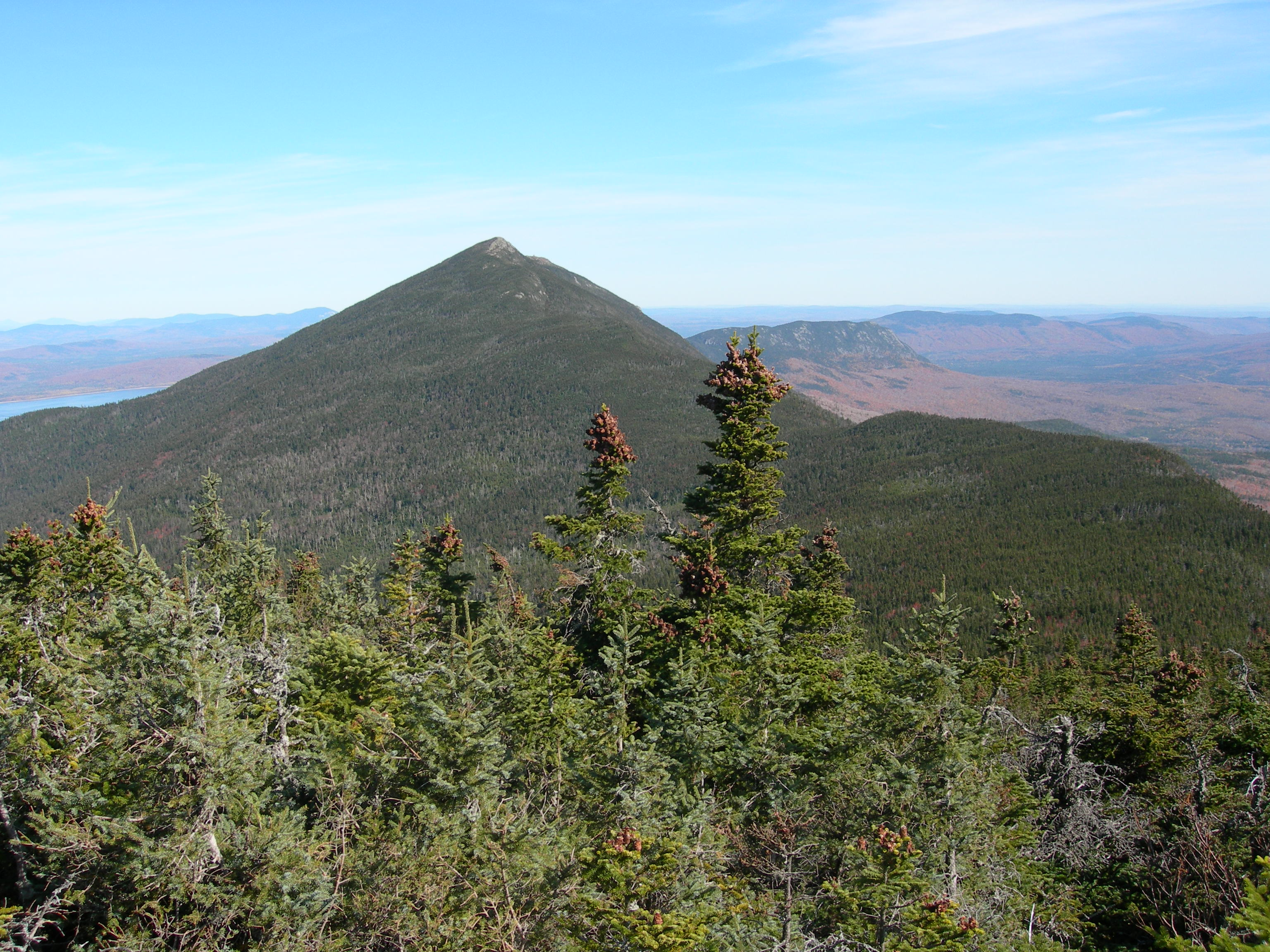
Mixed forest with balsam fir (Abies balsamea) at the southern edge of the white spruce range in Maine on the West Peak of Mount Bigelow

The southern edge of the zone in which white spruce forms 60% or more of the total stand corresponds more or less to the July isotherm of 18 °C (64 °F) around the Great Lakes; in the Prairie Provinces its limit is north of this isotherm. During the summer solstice, day length values range from 17 hours at its southern limits to 24 hours above the Arctic Circle.

One of the hardiest conifers, white spruce in parts of its range withstands mean daily January temperature of −6.7 °C (19.9 °F) and extreme minimum temperatures as low as −56.5 °C (−69.7 °F); minimum temperatures of −50 °C (−58 °F) are general throughout much of the range except the southernmost and southeasternmost parts. By itself, or with black spruce and tamarack (Larix laricina), white spruce forms the northern boundary of tree-form growth. White spruce up to 15 m in height occur at 69°N on islands in the Mackenzie Delta near Inuvik in the Northwest Territories. Hustich (1966) depicted Picea spp. as forming the northernmost limit of tree growth in North America.

The arctic or northern timberline in North America forms a broad transition zone from Labrador to northern Alaska. In Labrador, white spruce is not abundant and constitutes less than 5% of the forest, with a range that coincides very closely with that of black spruce but extending slightly further north.

The range of white spruce extends westwards from Newfoundland and Labrador, and along the northern limit of trees to Hudson Bay, Northwest Territories, Yukon, and into northwestern Alaska. Across western Canada and Alaska, white spruce occurs further north than black spruce, and, while poplar (Populus), willow, and birch may occur along streams well into the tundra beyond the limits of spruce, the hardwoods are usually no more than scrub. Spruce characteristically occurs in fingers of tree-form forest, extending far down the northern rivers and as scattered clumps of dwarfed "bush" spruce on intervening lands. In Manitoba, Scoggan noted that the northernmost collection of white spruce was at latitude 59°48'N, but Bryson et al. found white spruce in the northern edge of continuous forest in central Canada at Ennadai Lake, about 60°45′ N, 101°'W, just north of the northwest corner of Manitoba. Bryson et al. noted that the forest retained "the same general characteristics as when it was first described [by Tyrrell] in 1896". Collins and Sumner reported finding white spruce within 13 km of the Arctic coast in the Firth valley, Yukon, at about 69°30′ N, 139°30′ W, and Sargent noted that white spruce in Alaska "reached Behring Strait in 66°44′ N".

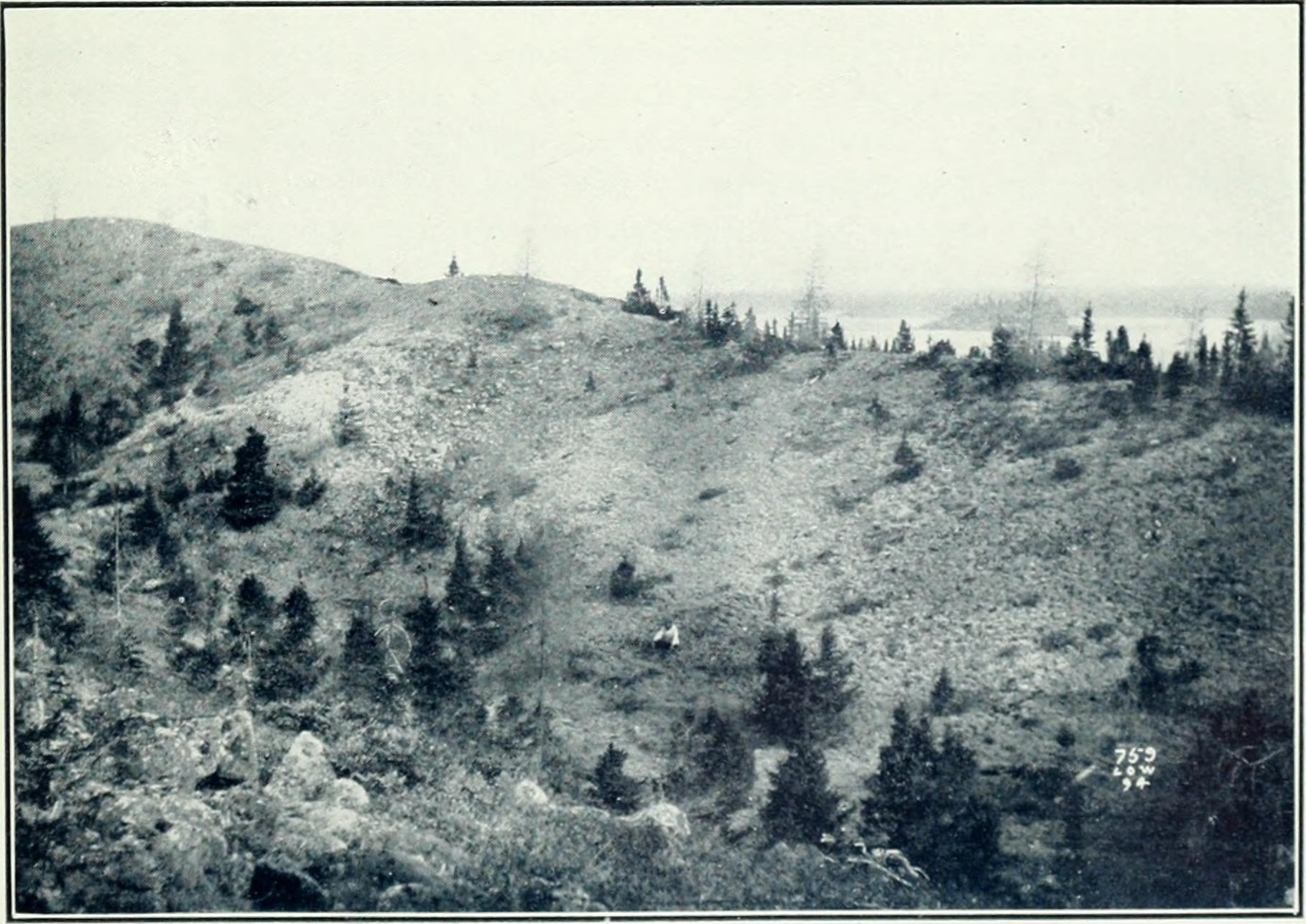
White spruce in the former District of Ungava, dwarfed (note seated human in white for scale, center)

Climate, especially temperature, is obviously a factor in determining distributions of northern flora. Halliday and Brown suggested that white spruce's northern limit corresponds "very closely" with the July mean monthly isotherm of 10 °C in Ungava, but that the northern limit west of Hudson Bay was south of that isotherm. Other climatic factors that have been suggested as affecting the northern limit of white spruce include: cumulative summer degree days, position of the Arctic front in July, mean net radiation especially during the growing season, and low light intensities. Topography, soil conditions, and glaciation may also be important in controlling northern limits of spruce.

The southern limit of distribution of white spruce is more complex. From east of the main range of coastal mountains in British Columbia, the southern continuous limit of white spruce is the forest/prairie interface through Alberta, Saskatchewan, Manitoba, the northern parts of Minnesota and Wisconsin, central Michigan, northeastern New York, and Maine. Sargent and Harlow and Harrar also included Vermont and New Hampshire; and, while Dame and Brooks excluded New York and states further west, they included Massachusetts as far south as Amherst and Northampton, "probably the southern limit of the species" in that area. Nisbet gave the range of white spruce as extending to "Carolina", but he did not recognize red spruce as a species and presumably included it with white spruce.

Towards the southern parts of its range, white spruce encounters increasingly effective ecological competition from hardwoods, some of which may reinforce their growth-rate or sprouting competitiveness with allelopathic depredation of coniferous regeneration. Further southward extension of the distribution is inhibited by white spruce's cold requirement.

=== As an exotic species ===
As an exotic, white spruce is widespread but uncommon. It was introduced into England and parts of continental Europe in or soon after the year 1700, into Denmark about 1790, and into Tasmania and Ceylon shortly before 1932.

Nisbet noted that firmly-rooted white spruce served very well to stabilize windswept edges of woods in Germany. In a narrow belt of mixed Norway and white spruces over an extremely exposed hilltop crest at high elevation in northern England, the Norway spruce were "completely dwarfed" whereas the white spruce had reached heights of between 3 and 4.3 m. The age of the belt was not recorded, but adjoining 66-year-old stands may have been of the same vintage.

White spruce has also been used as a minor plantation species in England and Scotland. In Scotland, at Corrour, Inverness-shire, Sir John Stirling Maxwell in 1907 began using white spruce in his pioneering plantations at high elevations on deep peat. However, plantations in Britain have generally been unsatisfactory, mainly because of damage by spring frosts after mild weather had induced flushing earlier in the season. However, the species is held in high regard in the Belgian peat region, where it grows better than other spruces.

== Ecology ==
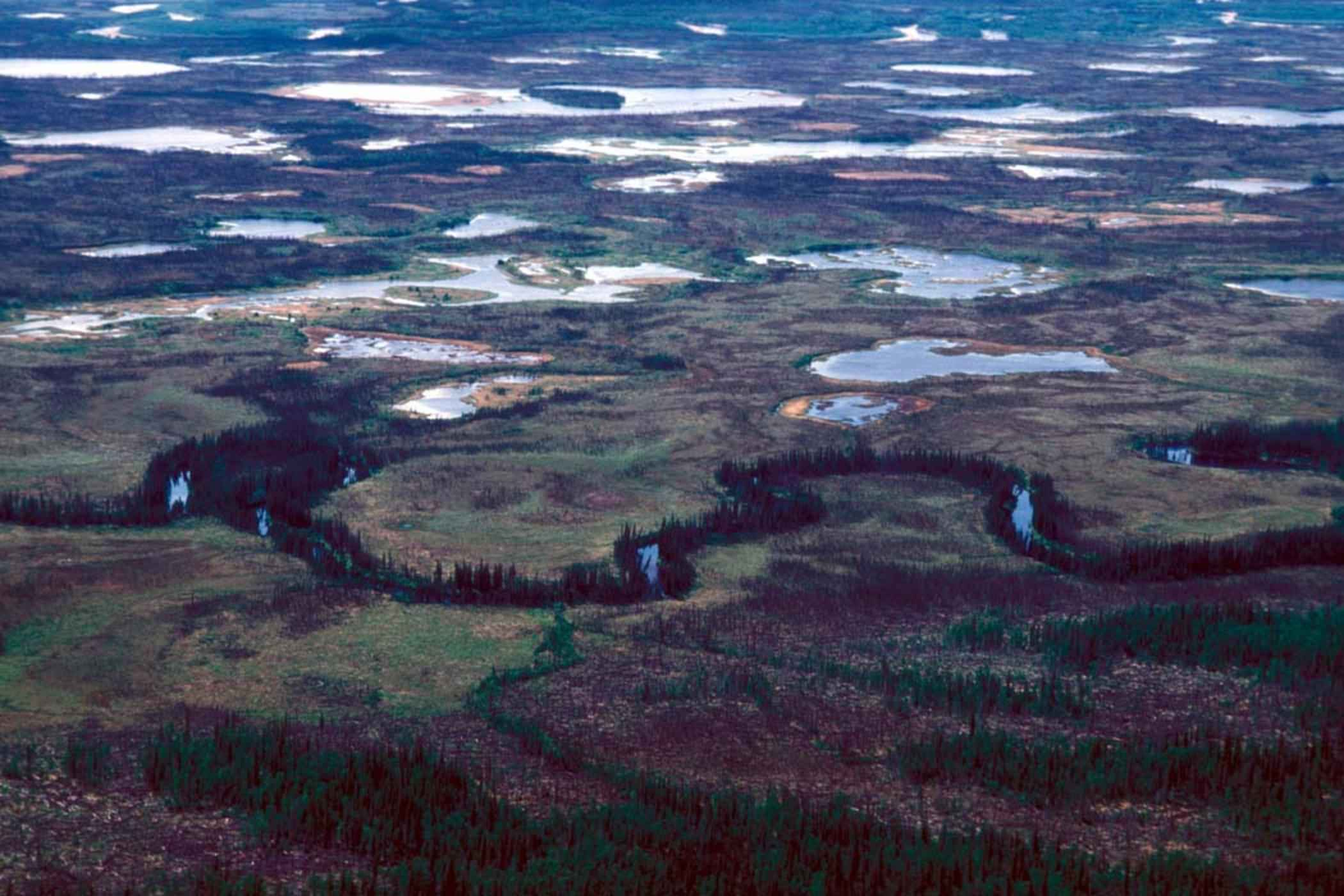
Growing in the riparian zone amid treeless bogs

White spruce is a climax canopy tree in the boreal forests of Canada and Alaska. It generally occurs on well-drained soils in alluvial and riparian zones, although it also occurs in soils of glacial and lacustrine origin. The understory is dominated by feather mosses (Hylocomium splendens, Pleurozium schreberi, Ptilium crista-castrensis) and fork mosses, and occasionally peat moss. In the far north, the total depth of the moss and underlying humus is normally between 25 and 46 cm (10 and 18 in), although it tends to be shallower when hardwoods are present in the stand.

White spruce grows in soils with pH values of 4.7–7.0, although they have been found in soils as acidic as 4.0 in subalpine fir forests in the Northwest Territories. A presence of calcium in the soil is common to white spruce found in northern New York. White spruce most commonly grows in the soil orders of Alfisols and Inceptisols. Soil properties such as fertility, temperature, and structural stability are partial determinants of the ability of white spruce to grow in the extreme northern latitudes. In the northern limits of its range, white spruce is the climax species along with black spruce; birch and aspen are the early succession species. Wildfires typically occur every 60 to 200 years, although they have been known to occur as infrequently as every 300 years.

White spruce will grow in USDA Growing Zones 3–7, but is not adapted to heat and humidity and will perform poorly in a hot climate. The tree attains its greatest longevity and growth potential in Zones 3–4.

Wildlife such as deer, rabbits, and grouse browse the foliage during the winter. The seeds are eaten by small mammals like the American red squirrel and birds such as chickadees, nuthatches, and pine siskin.

=== Soils ===
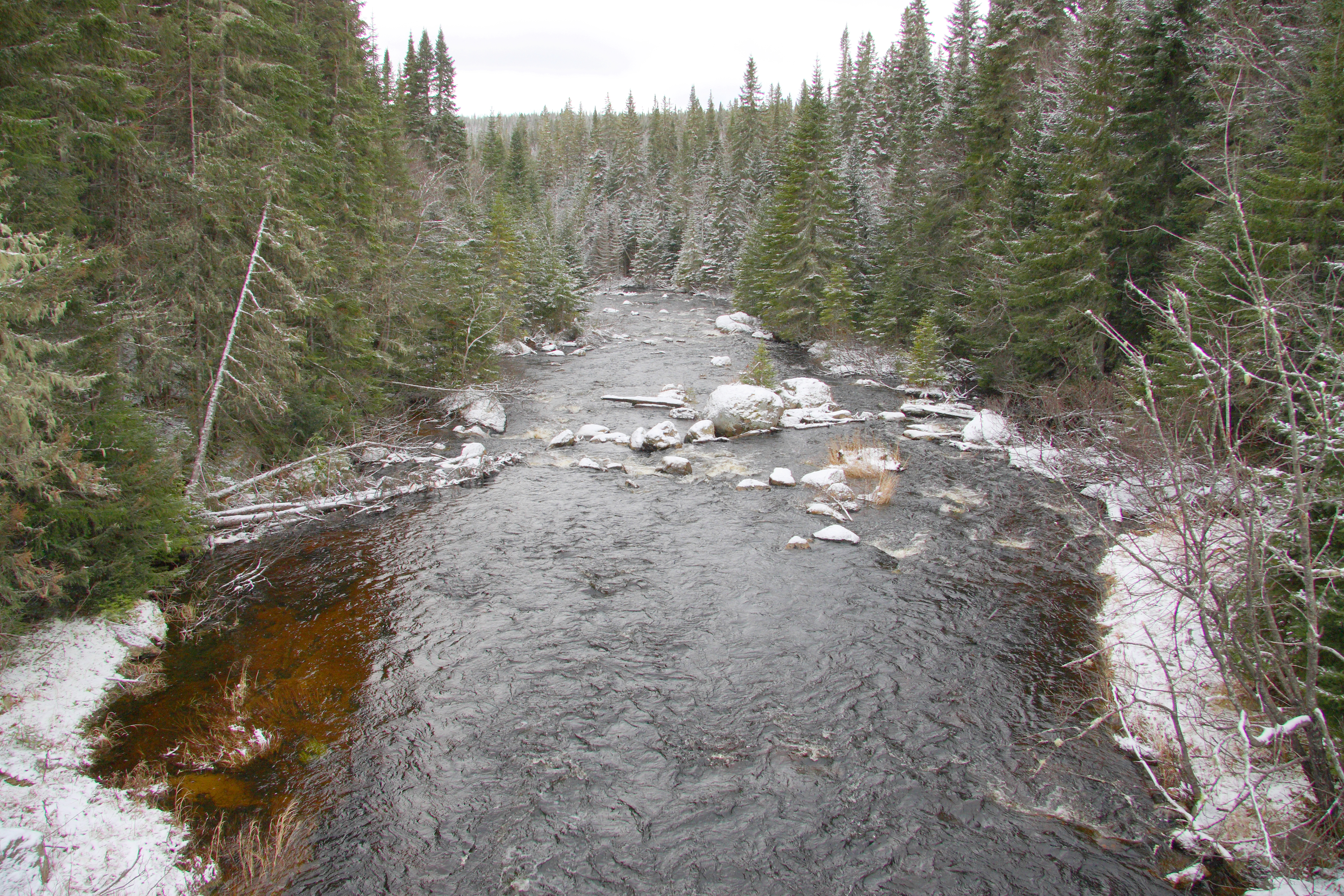
White spruce growing in the riparian zone of the Sautauriski River, Québec

White spruce occurs on a wide variety of soils, including soils of glacial, lacustrine, marine, and alluvial origins; overlying basic dolomites, limestones and acidic Precambrian and Devonian granites and gneisses; and Silurian sedimentary schists, shales, slates, and conglomerates. The wide range of textures accommodated includes clays, even those that are massive when wet and columnar when dry, sand flats, and coarse soils. Its occurrence on some organic soils is not characteristic, except perhaps on shallow mesic organic soils in Saskatchewan and in association with black spruce on organic soils in central Yukon.

Podzolized, brunisolic, luvisolic, gleysolic, and regosolic (immature) soils are typical of those supporting white spruce throughout the range of the species. Soils supporting white spruce are most commonly Alfisols or Inceptisols. In the podzol region of Wisconsin, white spruce occurs on loam podzols, podzolized gley loams, strongly podzolized clays, gley-podzol clays, stream-bottom soils, and wood peat. Moist sandy loams also support good growth. On sandy podzols, it is usually a minor species. Good development occurs on moist alluvium on the banks of streams and borders of swamps. White spruce makes good growth on well-drained lacustrine soils in Alberta Mixedwoods, on moderately-well-drained clay loams in Saskatchewan, and on melanized loams and clays (with sparse litter and a dark-coloured organically enriched mineral horizon) in the Algoma district of Ontario.

White spruce becomes less accommodating of soil with increasing severity of climate. The distribution of white spruce in Labrador seems to depend almost entirely on the character of the soil, and between the southwestern shores of Hudson Bay and the northeastern regions of Saskatchewan, white spruce is confined to very local physiographic features, characterized by well-drained or fertile soils.

On dry, deep, outwash deposits in northern Ontario, both white spruce and aspen grow slowly. But, broadly, white spruce is able to tolerate considerable droughtiness of sites that are fertile, and no fertile site is too moist unless soil moisture is stagnant. Soil fertility holds the key not just to white spruce growth but to the distribution of the species. At least moderate fertility is needed for good growth, but white spruce occurs on many sites where nutrient deficiencies depress its growth more than that of black spruce, red spruce, Norway spruce, and the pines generally. Minimum soil-fertility standards recommended for white spruce sufficient to produce 126 to 157 m^{3}/ha of wood at 40 years are much higher than for pine species commonly planted in the Lake States (Wilde 1966): 3.5% organic matter, 12.0 meq/100 g exchange capacity, 0.12% total N, 44.8 kg/ha available P, 145.7 kg/ha available K, 3.00 meq/100 g exchangeable Ca, and 0.70 meq/100 g exchangeable Mg.

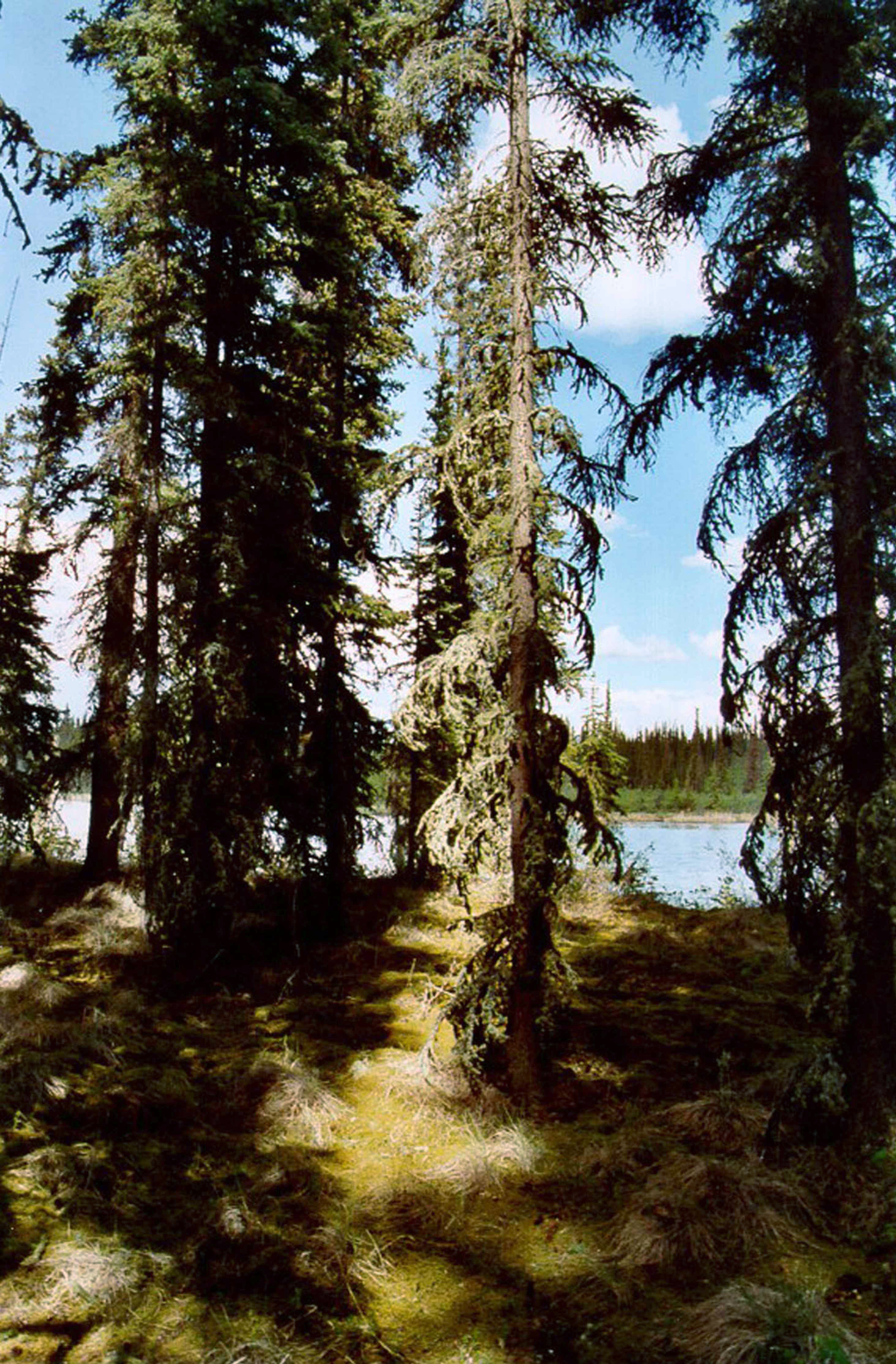
Mossy forest floor under white spruce

Forest floors under stands dominated by white spruce respond in ways that vary with site conditions, including the disturbance history of the site. Composition, biomass, and mineral soil physical and chemical properties are affected. In Alaska, the accumulation of organic layers (to greater thicknesses in mature stands of spruce than those in hardwood stands on similar sites) leads to decreased soil temperatures, in some cases leading to the development of permafrost. Acidity of the mineral soil sampled at an average depth of 17 cm in 13 white spruce stands on abandoned farmland in Ontario increased by 1.2 pH units over a period of 46 years.

A considerable range of soil pH is tolerated by white spruce. Thrifty stands of white spruce in Manitoba have developed on soils of pH 7.6 at only 10 cm below the surface, and pH 8.4 at 43 cm below the surface; rooting depth in those soils was at least 81 cm. An abundant calcium supply is common to most white spruce locations in New York state. Chlorosis was observed in young white spruce in heavily limed nursery soils at about pH 8.3. Wilde gave 4.7 to 6.5 as the approximate optimum range of pH for white spruce in Wisconsin, but optimum growth seems possible at pH levels up to 7.0 and perhaps higher. Alluvium on the floodplains of northern rivers shows pH levels from 5.0 to 8.2. High-lime ecotypes may exist, and in Canada Forest Section B8 the presence of balsam poplar and white spruce on some of the moulded moraines and clays seems to be correlated with the considerable lime content of these materials, while calcareous soils are favourable sites for northern outliers of white spruce.

Mature stands of white spruce in boreal regions often have well-developed moss layers dominated by feather mosses, e.g., Hylocomium splendens, Pleurozium schreberi, Ptlium crista-castrensis, and Dicranum, rather than Sphagnum. The thickness of the moss–organic layer commonly exceeds 25 cm in the far north and may approach twice that figure. The mosses compete for nutrients and have a major influence on soil temperatures in the rooting zone. Permafrost development in parts of Alaska, Yukon, and the Northwest Territories is facilitated by the insulative organic layer (Viereck 1970a, b, Gill 1975, Van Cleve and Yarie 1986).

=== Cold hardiness ===
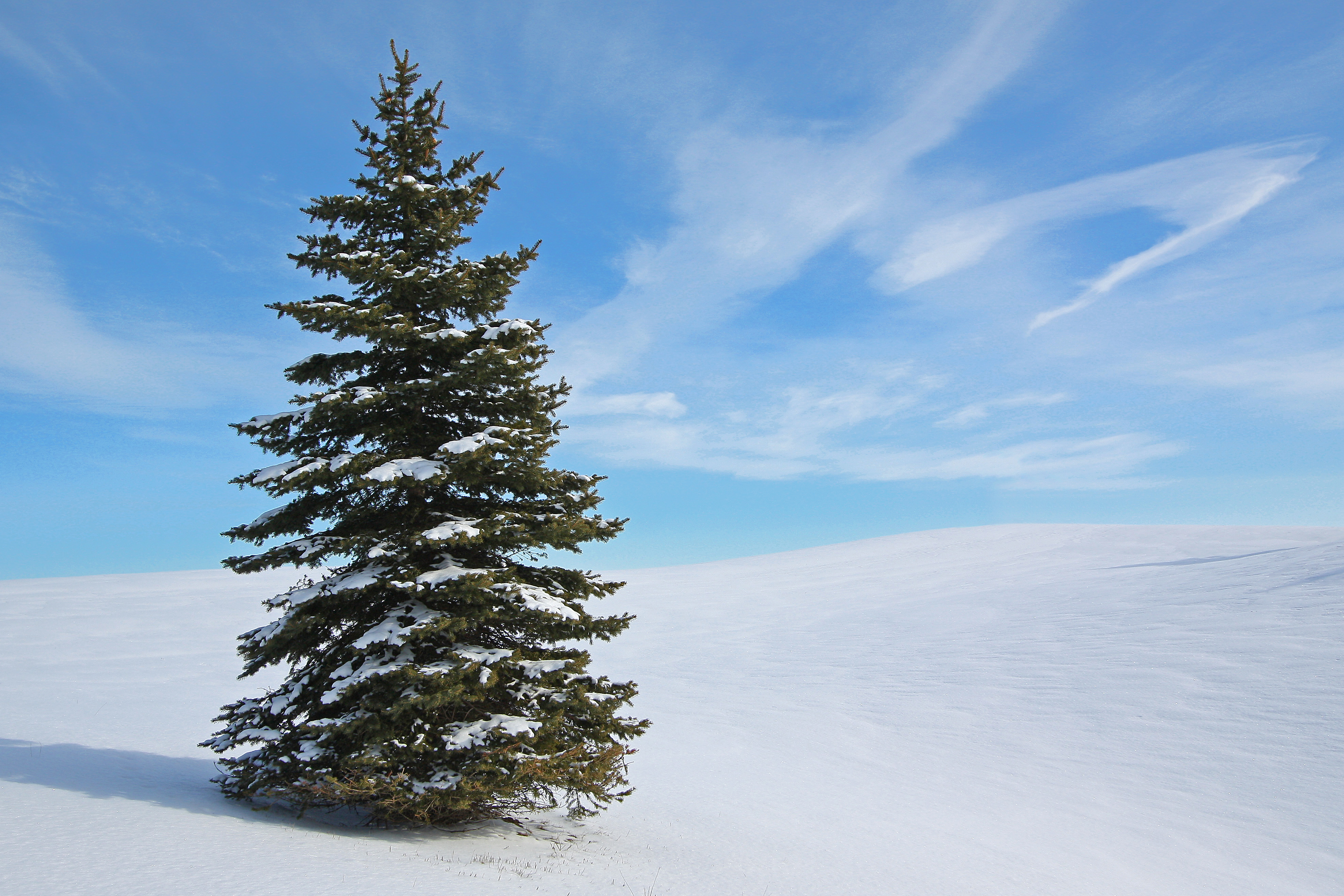
Young tree with light snowcover

White spruce is extremely hardy to low temperatures, provided the plant is in a state of winter dormancy. Throughout the greater part of its range, white spruce routinely survives and is undamaged by winter temperatures of −50 °C (−58 °F), and even lower temperatures occur in parts of the range. Boreal Picea are among the few extremely hardy conifers in which the bud primordia are able to survive temperatures down to −70 °C, −94 °F.

Especially important in determining the response of white spruce to low temperatures is the physiological state of the various tissues, notably the degree of "hardening" or dormancy. A natural progression of hardening and dehardening occurs in concert with the seasons. While different tissues vary in ability to tolerate exposure to stressful temperatures, white spruce, as with woody plants in general, has necessarily developed sufficient winter hardiness in its various tissues to enable them to survive the minimum temperatures experienced in the distribution range.

White spruce is subject to severe damage from spring frosts. Newly flushed shoots of white spruce are very sensitive to spring frost. This sensitivity is a major constraint affecting young trees planted without overstorey nurses in boreal climates.

=== Forest succession ===
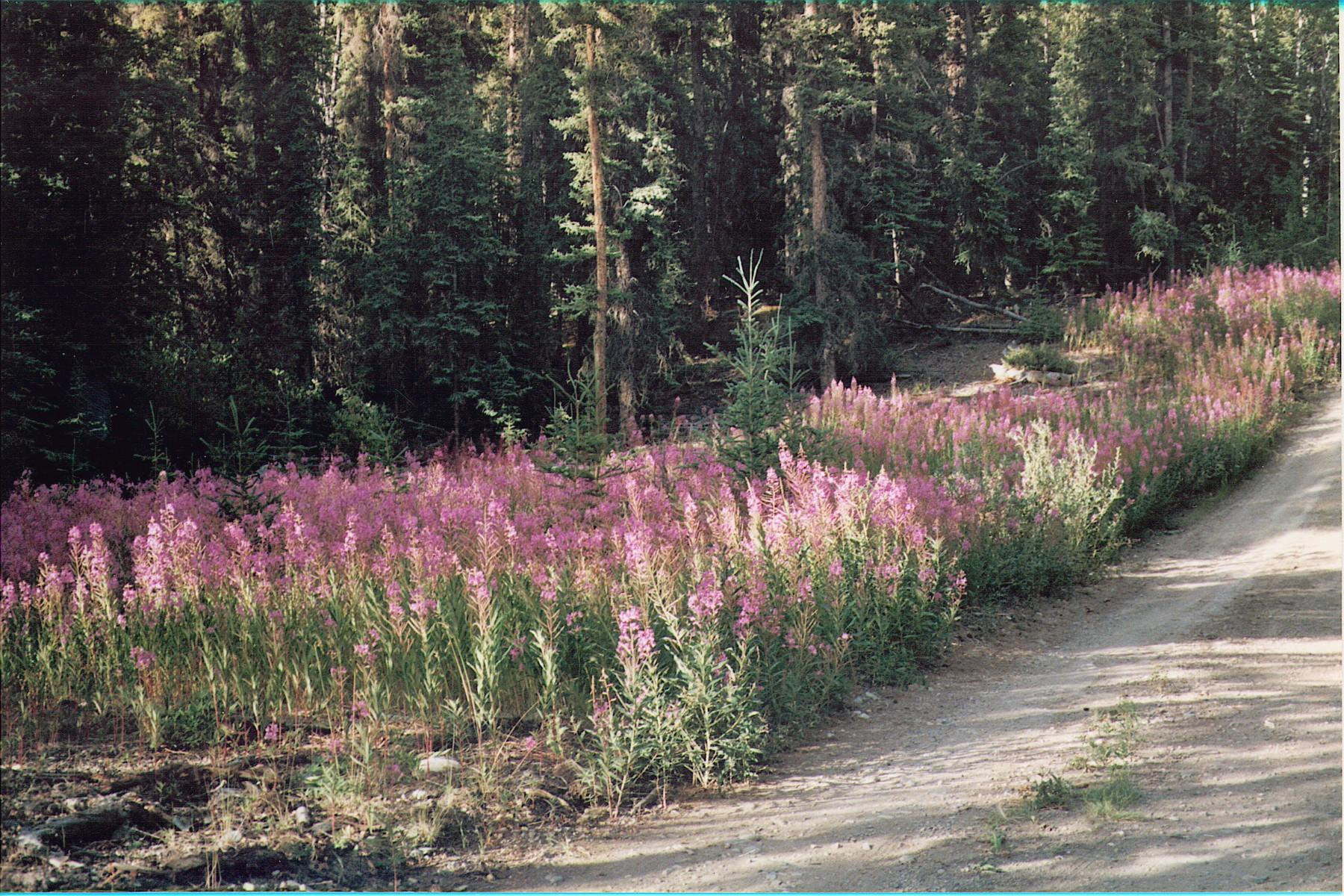
Disturbed roadside blooms with early succession fireweed; behind, late-succession Alaskan white spruce forest, Yukon

Forest succession in its traditional sense implies two important features that resist direct examination. First, classical definitions generally connote directional changes in species composition and community structure through time, yet the time frame needed for documentation of change far exceeds an average human lifespan. The second feature that defies quantitative description is the end point or climax.

Floodplain deposits in the Northwest Territory, Canada, are important in relation to the development of productive forest types with a component of white spruce. The most recently exposed surfaces are occupied by sandbar vegetation or riparian shrub willows and Alnus incana. With increasing elevation, the shrubs give way successively to balsam poplar and white spruce forest. In contrast, older floodplains, with predominantly brown wooded soils, typically carry white spruce–trembling aspen mixedwood forest.

Interrelationships among nutrient cycling, regeneration, and subsequent forest development on floodplains in interior Alaska were addressed by Van Cleve et al., who pointed out that the various stages in primary succession reflect physical, chemical, and biological controls of ecosystem structure and function. Thus, each successional stage has a species combination in harmony with site quality. Short-circuiting succession by planting a late successional species such as white spruce on an early successional surface may result in markedly reduced growth rates because of nitrogen insufficiency. Without application of substantial amounts of fertilizer, use would have to be made of early successional alder and its site-ameliorating additions of nitrogen.

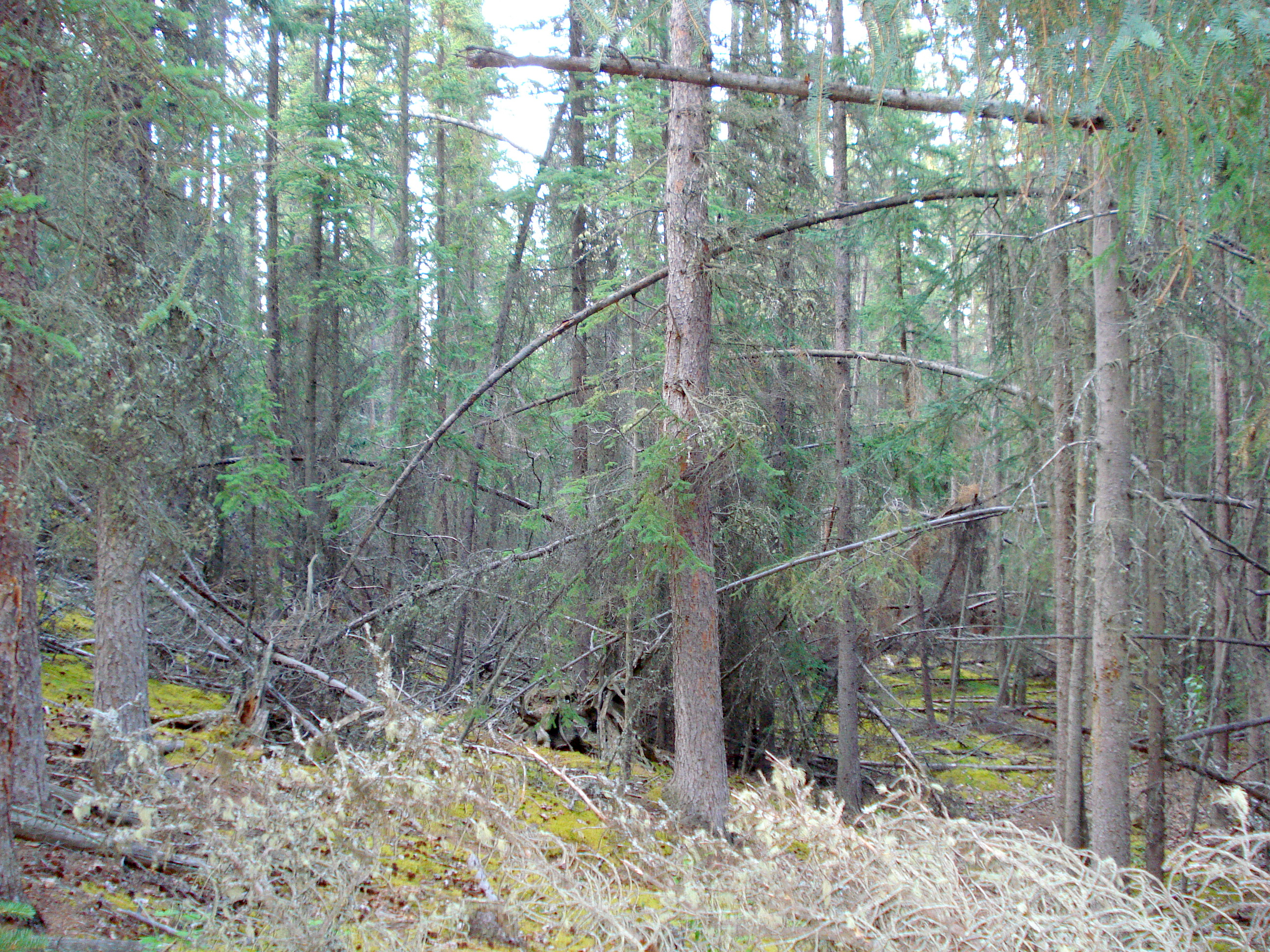
Old-growth Alaskan white spruce, Yukon

Neiland and Viereck noted that "the slow establishment and growth of spruce under birch stands [in Alaska] may be partially due to effects of shading and general competition for water and nutrients, but may also be more directly related to the birch itself. Heikinheimo found that birch ash inhibited white spruce seedlings, and Gregory found that birch litter has a smothering effect on spruce seedlings".

On dry upland sites, especially south-facing slopes, the mature vegetation is white spruce, white birch, trembling aspen, or a combination of these species. Succession follows in one of two general patterns. In most cases, aspen and birch develop as a successional stage after fire before reaching the spruce stage. But, occasionally, with optimal site conditions and a source of seed, white spruce will invade with the hardwoods or within a few years thereafter, thereby producing even-aged white spruce stands without an intervening hardwood stage.

=== Associated forest cover ===
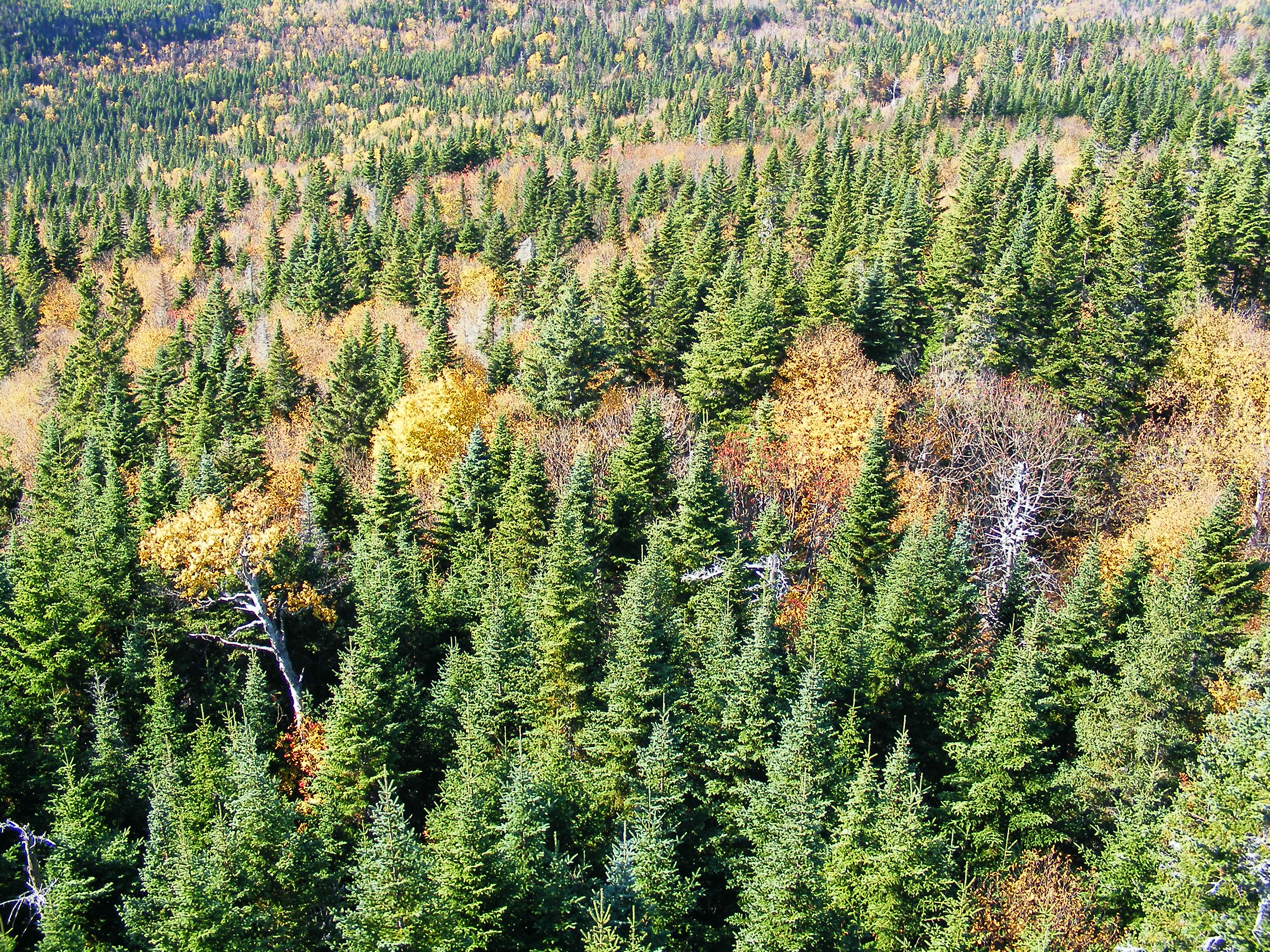
Taiga in the Gaspésie, Québec, including other species

The White Spruce Cover Type may include other species in small numbers. In Alaska, associates include paper birch, trembling aspen, balsam poplar, and black spruce; in western Canada, additional associates are subalpine fir, balsam fir, Douglas-fir, jack pine, and lodgepole pine. Seral species giving way to white spruce include paper birch, aspen, balsam poplar, jack pine, and lodgepole pine. On certain river bottom sites, however, black spruce may replace white spruce. Earlier successional stages leading to the white spruce climax are the white spruce–paper birch, white spruce–aspen, balsam poplar, jack pine, and lodgepole pine types. The type shows little variation. The forest is generally closed and the trees well formed, other than those close to the timberline. Lesser vegetation in mature stands is dominated by mosses. Vascular plants are typically few, but shrubs and herbs that occur "with a degree of regularity" include: alder, willows, mountain cranberry, red-fruit bearberry, black crowberry, prickly rose, currant, buffaloberry, blueberry species, bunchberry, twinflower, tall lungwort, northern comandra, horsetail, bluejoint grass, sedge species, as well as ground-dwelling mosses and lichens. Several white spruce communities have been identified in interior Alaska: white spruce/feathermoss; white spruce/dwarf birch/feathermoss; white spruce/dwarf birch/sphagnum; white spruce/avens/moss; and white spruce/alder/bluejoint.

Of the Eastern Forest Cover Types recognized by the Society of American Foresters, only one, White Spruce, names that species in its title. The eastern White Spruce Cover Type, as defined, encompasses white spruce both in pure stands, and in mixed stands "in which white spruce is the major [undefined] component".

In most of its range, white spruce occurs more typically in association with trees of other species than in pure stands.

White spruce is an associated species in the following Eastern Forest cover types, by the Society of American Foresters; in the Boreal Forest Region: (1) jack pine, (5) balsam fir, (12) black spruce, (16) aspen, (18) paper birch, and (38) tamarack; in the Northern Forest Region: (15) red pine, (21) eastern white pine, (24) hemlock-yellow birch, (25) sugar maple-beech-yellow birch, (27) sugar maple, (30) red spruce-yellow birch, (32) red spruce, (33) red spruce-balsam fir, (37) northern white-cedar, and (39) black ash-American elm-red maple.

=== Predators ===
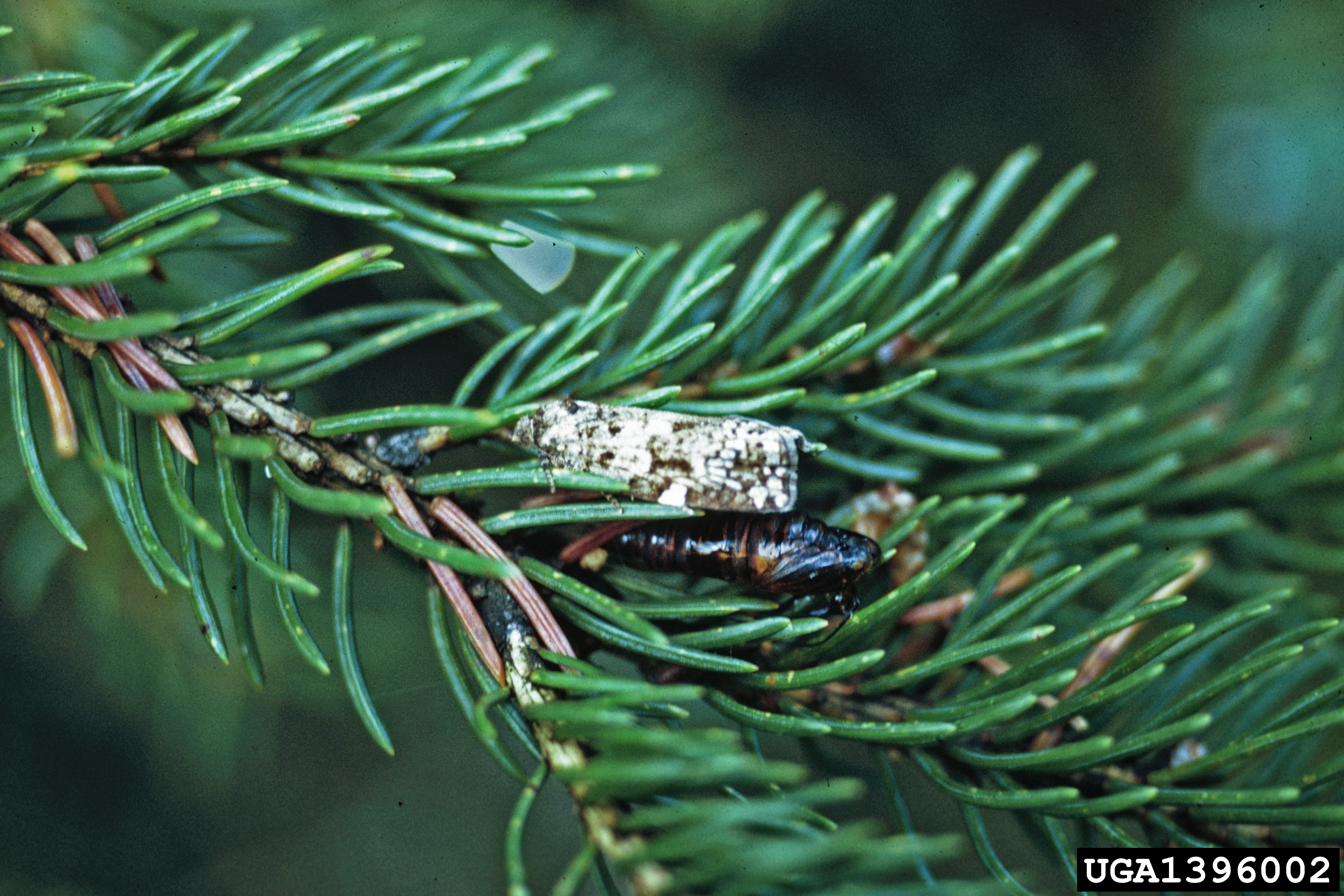
Choristoneura fumiferana, the eastern spruce budworm. Adult (silvery) and pupa (dark brown) on a white spruce.

Outbreaks of spruce beetles have destroyed over 2,300,000 acres (9,300 km^{2}) of forests in Alaska.

Although sometimes described as relatively resistant to attack by insects and disease, white spruce is far from immune to depredation. Important insect pests of white spruce include the spruce budworm (Choristoneura fumiferana), the yellow-headed spruce sawfly (Pikonema alaskensis), the European spruce sawfly (Gilpinia hercyniae), the spruce bud moth (Zeiraphera canadensis), and spruce beetle (Dendroctonus rufipennis). As well, other budworms, sawflies, and bark beetles, gall formers, bud midges, leaf miners, aphids, leaf eaters, leaf rollers, loopers, mites, scales, weevils, borers, pitch moths, and spittlebugs cause varying degrees of damage to white spruce.

A number of sawflies feed on spruce trees. Among them European spruce sawfly, yellow-headed spruce sawfly, green-headed spruce sawfly and the spruce webspinning sawfly.

In eastern Canada, more than a dozen species of inchworms feed on white spruce, feeding periods vary by species:

- Species feeding in autumn and spring include the dash-lined looper (Protoboarmia porcelaria), the diamond-backed looper (Hypagyrtis piniata), the fringed looper (Campaea perlata), and several false loopers (Syngrapha).
- Summer-feeding species include the false hemlock looper (Nepytia canosaria), which may occur in large numbers and often in association with the hemlock looper (Lambdina fiscellaria), as well as Eupithecia, the yellow-lined conifer looper (Cladara limitaria), and the saddleback looper (Ectropis crepuscularia).
- Species feeding primarily in late summer and autumn include the common spruce–fir looper (Macaria signaria), the similar hemlock angle moth (Macaria fissinotata) on hemlock, small spruce loopers (Eupithecia ), the grey spruce looper (Caripeta divisata), which is occasionally abundant, the black-dashed hydriomena moth (Hydriomena divisaria), and the whitelined looper (Eufidonia notataria).

== Cultivars ==
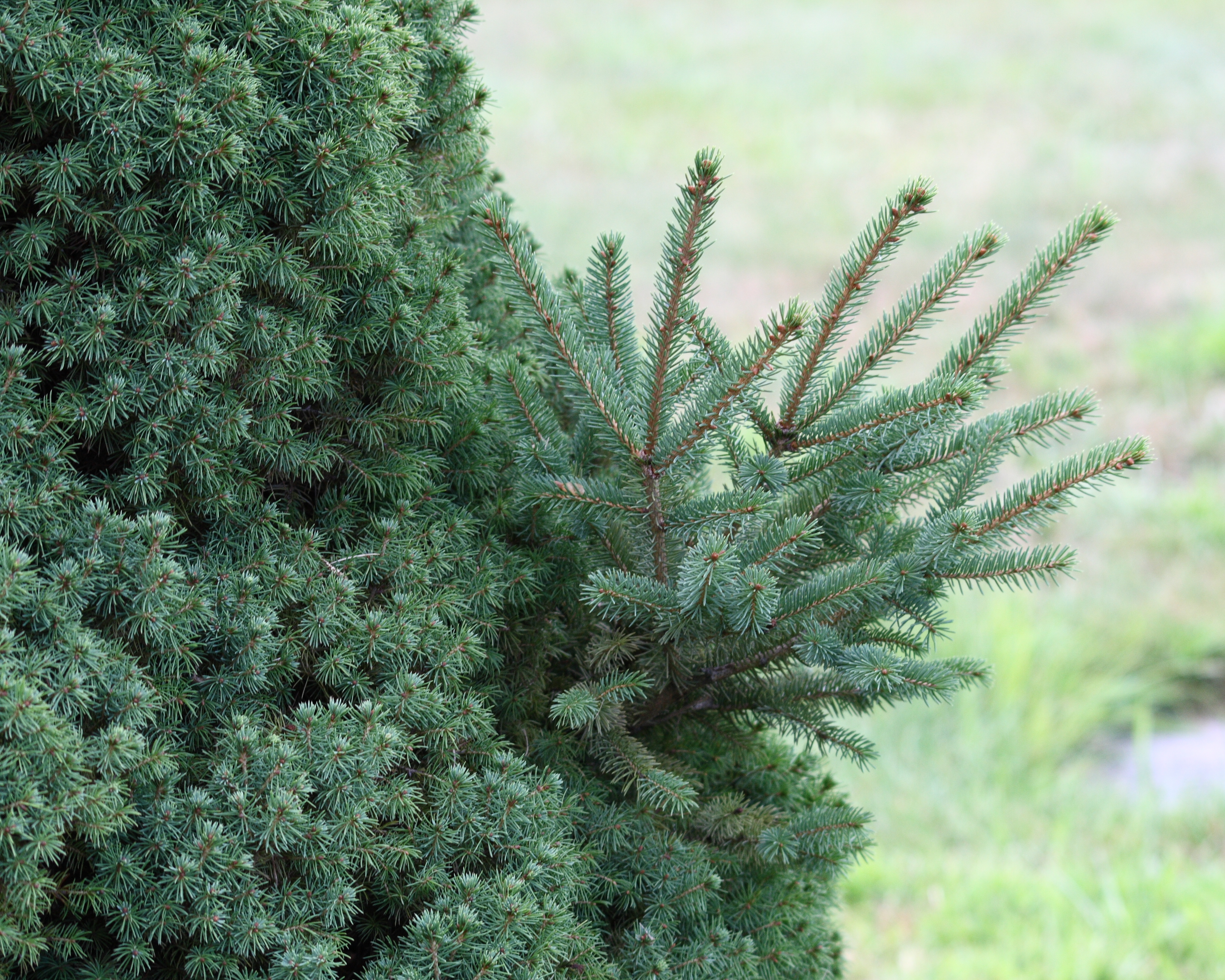
A dwarf Alberta white spruce Picea × albertiana, with reversion in one branch

Numerous cultivars of various sizes, colours and shapes have been selected for use in parks and gardens. The following have gained the Royal Horticultural Society's Award of Garden Merit. Several are derived from the hybrid Picea × albertiana, but are retained in the listing below, as horticultural databases have not yet adopted the new nomenclature.

- Picea glauca 'Echiniformis'
- Picea glauca var. albertiana 'Alberta Globe'
- Picea glauca var. albertiana 'Conica'

'Conica' is a dwarf conifer with very slender leaves, like those normally found only on one-year-old seedlings, and has very slow growth, typically only 2–10 cm (3/4–4 in) per year. Older specimens commonly 'revert', developing normal adult foliage and starting to grow much faster; this 'reverted' growth must be pruned if the plant is to be kept dwarf.

== Uses ==
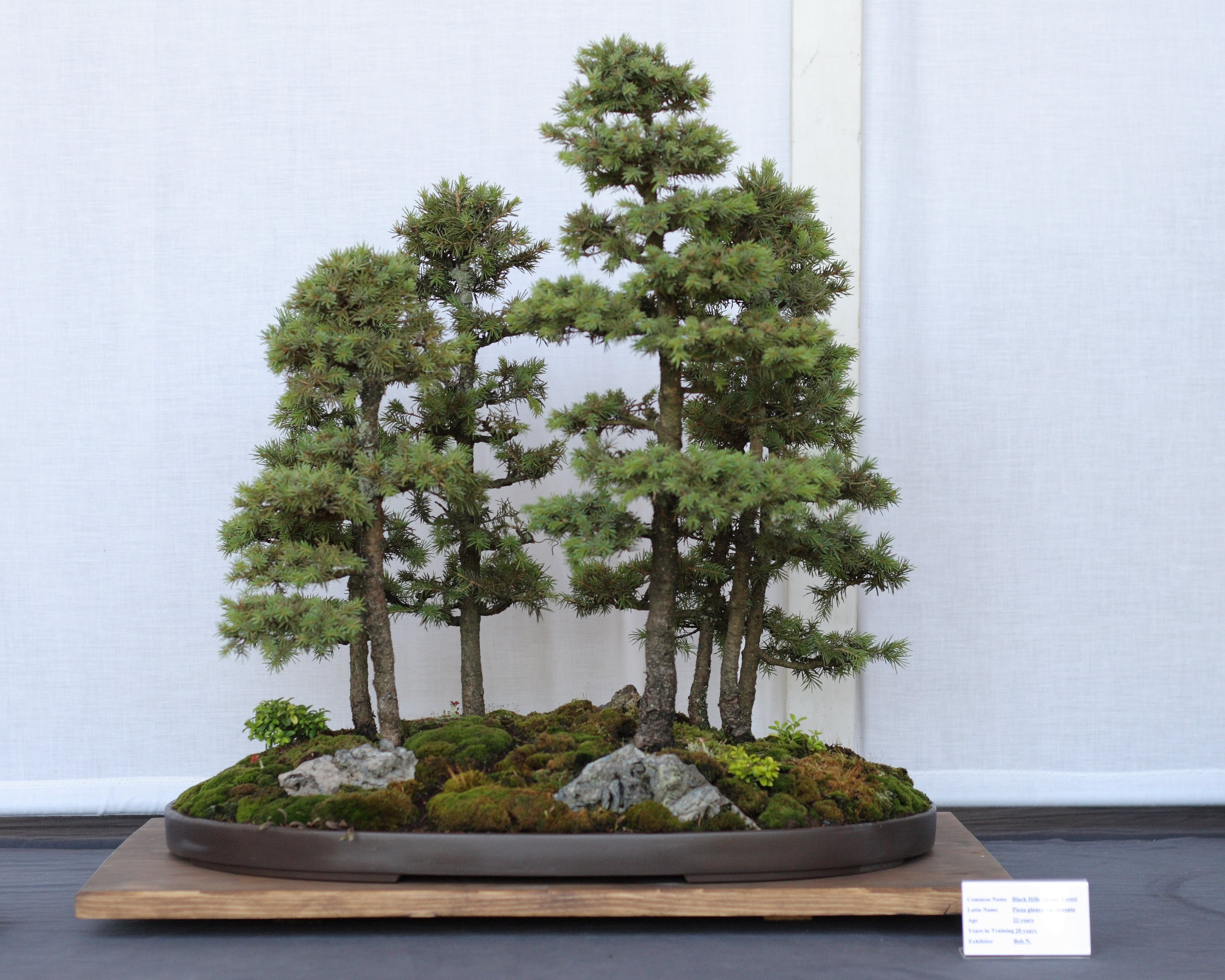
Black Hills spruce grown as bonsai

The wood of white spruce is of a lower quality than that of Engelmann spruce, but is stronger. It was used to make shelters and as firewood by Alaska Natives and European settlers in Alaska, where lodgepole pine does not grow. The wood is of major economic importance in Canada, being harvested for paper and construction. It is also used as a Christmas tree.

The wood is also exported to Japan where, known as "shin-kaya", it is used to make go boards as a substitute for the rare kaya wood. Additionally, Picea glauca var. densata is used for bonsai.

White spruce is the provincial tree of Manitoba and the state tree of South Dakota.

The new growth or tips of white spruce is used in beer making, gin production, flavouring soda, candy making or in pickles and preserves.
