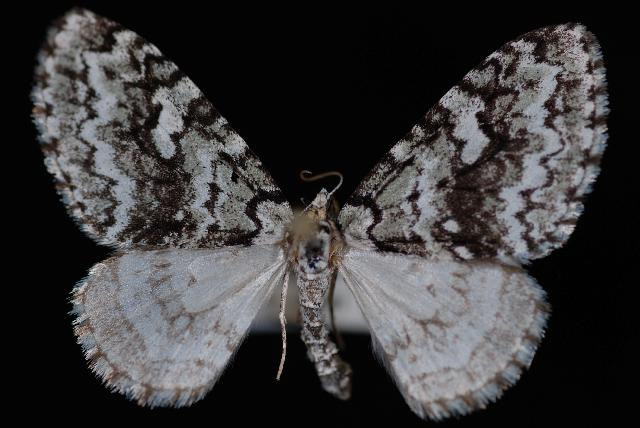

Scientific classification
- Kingdom: Animalia
- Phylum: Arthropoda
- Class: Insecta
- Order: Lepidoptera
- Family: Geometridae
- Genus: Cladara
- Species: C. atroliturata

Binomial name
- Cladara atroliturata (Walker, 1863)

= Cladara atroliturata =

Species of moth

Cladara atroliturata, the scribbler, is a moth in the family Geometridae. The species was first described by Francis Walker in 1863. It is found in North America.

The MONA or Hodges number for Cladara atroliturata is 7639.
