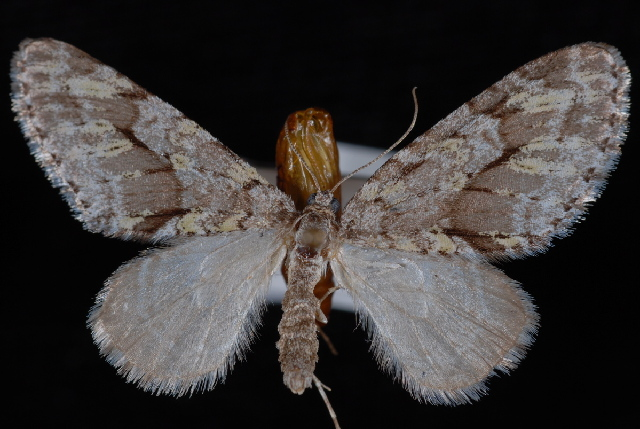
- Cladara limitaria

Scientific classification
- Kingdom: Animalia
- Phylum: Arthropoda
- Class: Insecta
- Order: Lepidoptera
- Family: Geometridae
- Subfamily: Larentiinae
- Genus: Cladara; Hulst, 1896

= Cladara =

Genus of moths

Cladara is a genus of moths in the family Geometridae described by George Duryea Hulst in 1896.

== Species ==
- Cladara anguilineata (Grote & Robinson, 1867)
- Cladara atroliturata (Walker, 1863)
- Cladara limitaria (Walker, 1860)
- Cladara ustata (Christoph, 1880)
