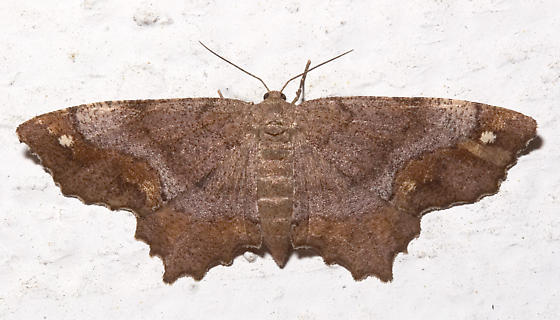

Scientific classification
- Domain: Eukaryota
- Kingdom: Animalia
- Phylum: Arthropoda
- Class: Insecta
- Order: Lepidoptera
- Family: Geometridae
- Genus: Hypagyrtis
- Species: H. esther

Binomial name
- Hypagyrtis esther (Barnes, 1928)

Synonyms
- Hypagyrtis lemmeri (Barnes, 1928)

= Hypagyrtis esther =

Species of moth

Hypagyrtis esther, the esther moth, is a moth of the family Geometridae. It was first described by William Barnes in 1928 and it is found in the United States from Massachusetts to Florida, west to Texas, north to Ohio.

The wingspan is 25–45 mm. Adults are on wing from May to October and from July to August in Ohio.

The larvae feed on the leaves of Pinus species.
