= Cladara anguilineata =

Scientific classification
- Kingdom: Animalia
- Phylum: Arthropoda
- Class: Insecta
- Order: Lepidoptera
- Family: Geometridae
- Subfamily: Larentiinae
- Genus: Cladara
- Species: C. anguilineata

Binomial name
- Cladara anguilineata (Grote & Robinson, 1867)

Species of moth

Cladara anguilineata, the angle-lined carpet moth, is a species of geometrid moth in the family Geometridae.

The MONA or Hodges number for Cladara anguilineata is 7638.
