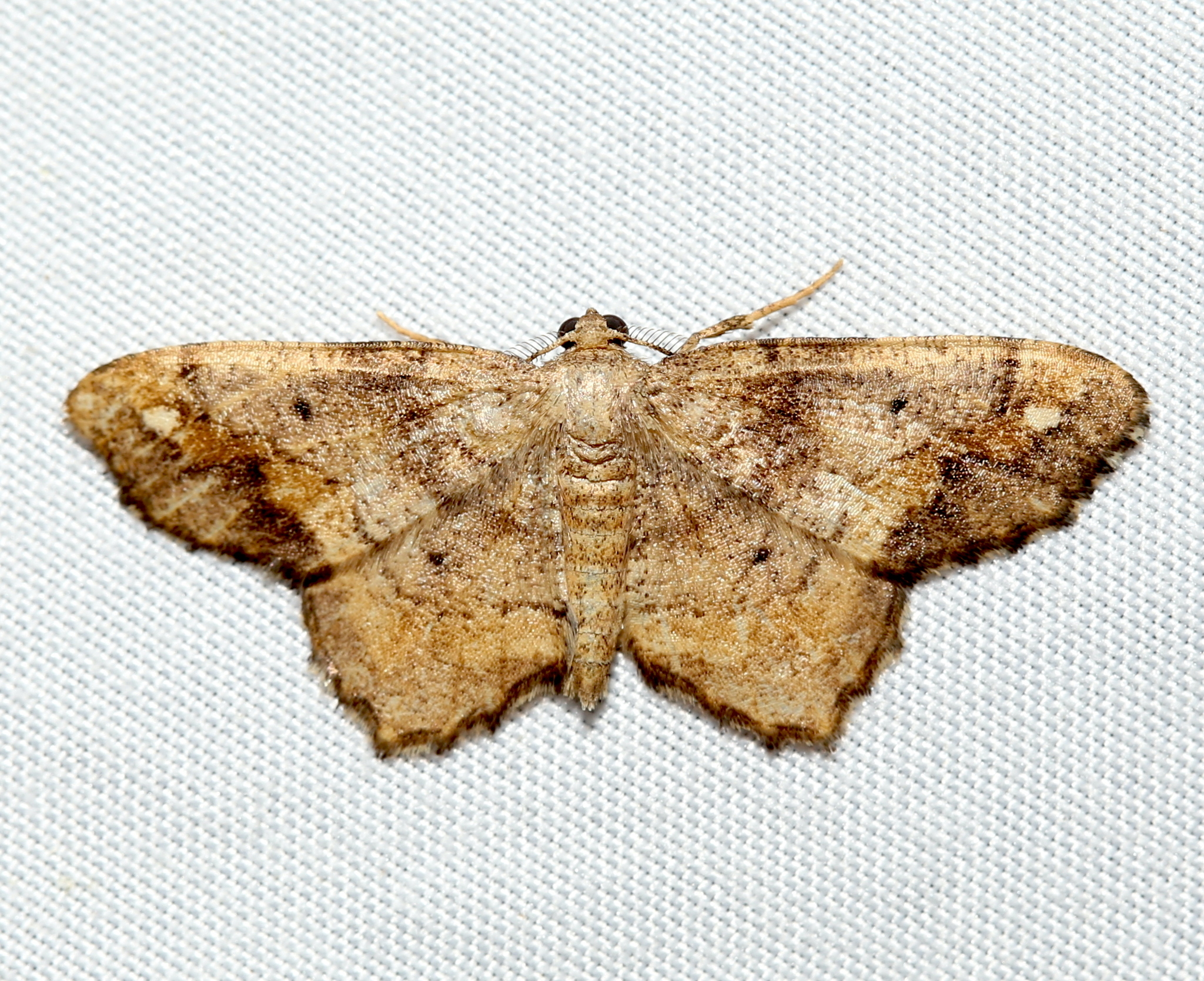

Scientific classification
- Kingdom: Animalia
- Phylum: Arthropoda
- Clade: Pancrustacea
- Class: Insecta
- Order: Lepidoptera
- Family: Geometridae
- Genus: Hypagyrtis
- Species: H. unipunctata

Binomial name
- Hypagyrtis unipunctata (Haworth, 1809)

Subspecies
- Hypagyrtis pustularia Hübner, 1818; Hypagyrtis subatomaria (Wood, 1839) (spring form); Hypagyrtis deplanaria (Guenée, 1857); Hypagyrtis nubecularia (Guenée, 1857); Hypagyrtis mamurraria (Guenée, 1857); Hypagyrtis triplicipunctata (Fitch, 1860); Hypagyrtis impropriata (Walker, 1861); Hypagyrtis fidoniaria (Walker, 1862); Hypagyrtis exsuperata (Walker, 1863)

= Hypagyrtis unipunctata =

Species of moth

Hypagyrtis unipunctata, the one-spotted variant moth or white spot, is a moth of the family Geometridae. The species was first described by Adrian Hardy Haworth in 1809. It can be found from Nova Scotia to Florida, west to Texas, northwest to British Columbia on the North American continent, and is also found in Eurasia.

The wingspan is 20–47 mm. Adults are on wing from April to September in most of North America and from June to July in northern North America. There are one to two generations per year.

The larvae feed on the leaves of a wide range of deciduous trees and shrubs, including Amelanchier, Rosa, Prunus, Salix, Populus, Alnus, Betula, Corylus, Fraxinus, Tilia, Ulmus, Quercus and Acer.
