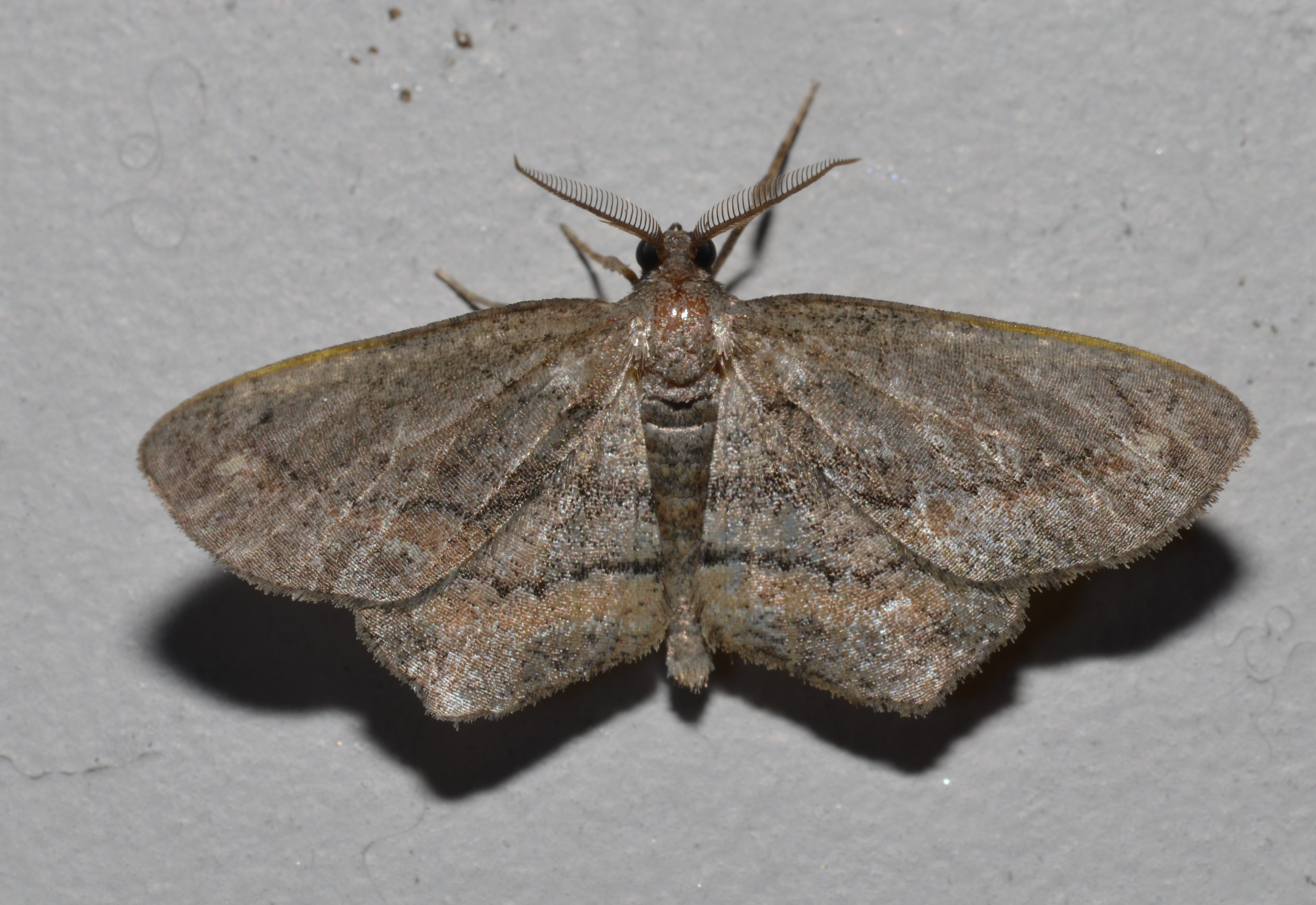

Scientific classification
- Domain: Eukaryota
- Kingdom: Animalia
- Phylum: Arthropoda
- Class: Insecta
- Order: Lepidoptera
- Family: Geometridae
- Genus: Hypagyrtis
- Species: H. brendae

Binomial name
- Hypagyrtis brendae Heitzman, 1975

= Hypagyrtis brendae =

Species of moth

Hypagyrtis brendae, or Brenda's hypagyrtis moth, is a moth of the family Geometridae. The species was first described by R. L. Heitzman in 1975. It is found in North America, where it has been recorded from Florida, Indiana, Kentucky, Missouri and North Carolina.

The wingspan is about 26 mm. Adults have been recorded on wing from April to September.
