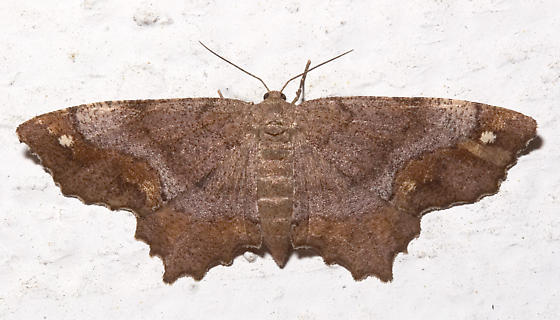
- Hypagyrtis esther

Scientific classification
- Kingdom: Animalia
- Phylum: Arthropoda
- Clade: Pancrustacea
- Class: Insecta
- Order: Lepidoptera
- Family: Geometridae
- Tribe: Bistonini
- Genus: Hypagyrtis; Hübner, 1818

Synonyms
- Amilapis Guenee, 1857; Paraphia Guenee, 1857

= Hypagyrtis =

Genus of moths

Hypagyrtis is a genus of moths in the family Geometridae erected by Jacob Hübner in 1818.

== Species ==
- Hypagyrtis brendae Heitzman, 1975
- Hypagyrtis caesia (Herrich-Schaffer, 1892)
- Hypagyrtis esther (Barnes, 1928)
- Hypagyrtis globulariae (Guerin-Meneville, 1844)
- Hypagyrtis pallidaria Warren, 1907
- Hypagyrtis piniata (Packard, 1870)
- Hypagyrtis unipunctata (Haworth, 1809)

== Taxonomy ==
This genus has been placed in various tribes over time: Forbes (1948) placed it in Melanolophiini, McGuffin (1977) moved it to Boarmiini. Hodges et al. (1983) moved it to Bistonini and finally Rindge (1985) moved it back to Boarmiini.
