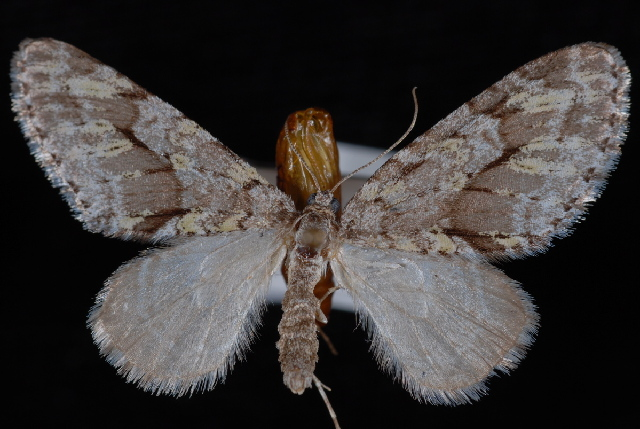

Scientific classification
- Kingdom: Animalia
- Phylum: Arthropoda
- Class: Insecta
- Order: Lepidoptera
- Family: Geometridae
- Subfamily: Larentiinae
- Genus: Cladara
- Species: C. limitaria

Binomial name
- Cladara limitaria (Walker, 1860)

= Cladara limitaria =

Species of moth

Cladara limitaria, the mottled gray carpet moth, is a species of geometrid moth in the family Geometridae.

== Overview ==
It is found in North America, ranging as far west as Alaska, to as far east as Newfoundland and Labrador, and as far south as Alabama.

The wingspan of this moth is from 21mm to 28mm. Adults are found from April to June. Caterpillars of the species will feed on sheep laurel and conifers.

Adults are found in deciduous, mixed, and coniferous forests. They are attracted to light.

The MONA or Hodges number for Cladara limitaria is 7637.
