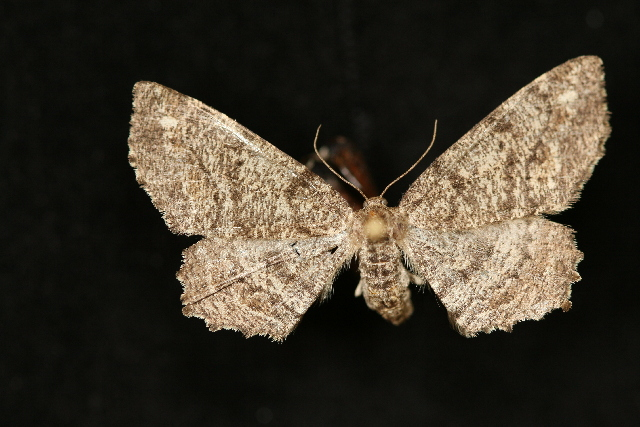

Scientific classification
- Kingdom: Animalia
- Phylum: Arthropoda
- Clade: Pancrustacea
- Class: Insecta
- Order: Lepidoptera
- Family: Geometridae
- Genus: Hypagyrtis
- Species: H. piniata

Binomial name
- Hypagyrtis piniata (Packard, 1870)

= Hypagyrtis piniata =

Species of moth

Hypagyrtis piniata, the pine measuringworm, is a species of geometrid moth in the family Geometridae. It is found in North America.
