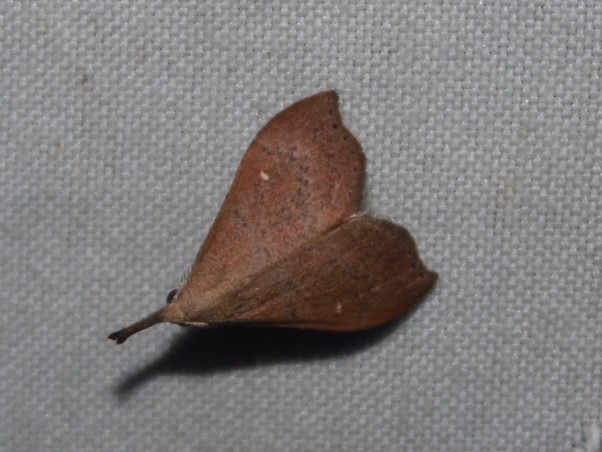

Scientific classification
- Domain: Eukaryota
- Kingdom: Animalia
- Phylum: Arthropoda
- Class: Insecta
- Order: Lepidoptera
- Superfamily: Noctuoidea
- Family: Erebidae
- Genus: Macristis
- Species: M. geminipunctalis

Binomial name
- Macristis geminipunctalis Schaus, 1916

= Macristis geminipunctalis =

Species of moth

Macristis geminipunctalis is a species of litter moth in the family Erebidae. It is found in North America.
