= Lascoria alucitalis =

Scientific classification
- Kingdom: Animalia
- Phylum: Arthropoda
- Class: Insecta
- Order: Lepidoptera
- Superfamily: Noctuoidea
- Family: Erebidae
- Genus: Lascoria
- Species: L. alucitalis

Binomial name
- Lascoria alucitalis Guenée, 1854

Synonyms
- Tortricodes alucitalis (Guenée, 1854)

Species of moth

Lascoria alucitalis is a species of litter moth of the family Erebidae. It is found from Central America to the Guyanas, Cuba, Puerto Rico and Jamaica. It is also found in Florida.
