= Lascoria aon =

Scientific classification
- Domain: Eukaryota
- Kingdom: Animalia
- Phylum: Arthropoda
- Class: Insecta
- Order: Lepidoptera
- Superfamily: Noctuoidea
- Family: Erebidae
- Genus: Lascoria
- Species: L. aon

Binomial name
- Lascoria aon Druce, 1891

Species of moth

Lascoria aon is a species of litter moth of the family Erebidae. It is found in North America.
