= Macristis bilinealis =

Scientific classification
- Domain: Eukaryota
- Kingdom: Animalia
- Phylum: Arthropoda
- Class: Insecta
- Order: Lepidoptera
- Superfamily: Noctuoidea
- Family: Erebidae
- Genus: Macristis
- Species: M. bilinealis

Binomial name
- Macristis bilinealis (Barnes & McDunnough, 1912)

Species of moth

Macristis bilinealis is a species of litter moth in the family Erebidae first described by William Barnes and James Halliday McDunnough in 1912. It is found in North America.

The MONA or Hodges number for Macristis bilinealis is 8402.
