= L. cristata =

L. cristata may refer to:

- Lagerstroemia cristata, a species of plant in the genus Lagerstroemia
- Lascoria cristata, a species of moth in the genus Lascoria
- Lasiodora cristata, a species of tarantula in the genus Lasiodora
- Lepiota cristata, a species of mushroom in the genus Lepiota commonly called the stinking dapperling
- Lophostrix cristata, a species of owl in the family Strigidae commonly called the crested owl
- Lophotibis cristata, a species of bird in the ibis subfamily (Threskiornithinae) called the Madagascan ibis
