= Redectis pygmaea =

Scientific classification
- Kingdom: Animalia
- Phylum: Arthropoda
- Clade: Pancrustacea
- Class: Insecta
- Order: Lepidoptera
- Superfamily: Noctuoidea
- Family: Erebidae
- Genus: Redectis
- Species: R. pygmaea

Binomial name
- Redectis pygmaea (Grote, 1878)

Synonyms
- Dercetis pygmaea Grote, 1878

Species of moth

Redectis pygmaea, the pygmy redectis, is a litter moth of the family Erebidae. The species was first described by Augustus Radcliffe Grote in 1878. It is found in the US from New York to Florida, and west to Texas.

The wingspan is about 14 mm. Adults are on wing from June to September.
