= Lascoria maronialis =

Scientific classification
- Kingdom: Animalia
- Phylum: Arthropoda
- Class: Insecta
- Order: Lepidoptera
- Superfamily: Noctuoidea
- Family: Erebidae
- Genus: Lascoria
- Species: L. maronialis

Binomial name
- Lascoria maronialis Schaus, 1916

Species of moth

Lascoria maronialis is a species of litter moth of the family Erebidae first described by William Schaus in 1916. It is found in South America, including French Guiana.
