= Bleptina minimalis =

Scientific classification
- Domain: Eukaryota
- Kingdom: Animalia
- Phylum: Arthropoda
- Class: Insecta
- Order: Lepidoptera
- Superfamily: Noctuoidea
- Family: Erebidae
- Genus: Bleptina
- Species: B. minimalis

Binomial name
- Bleptina minimalis Barnes & McDunnough, 1912

Species of moth

Bleptina minimalis, the small owlet moth, is a species of litter moth in the family Erebidae. It was first described by William Barnes and James Halliday McDunnough in 1812 and it is found in North America.

The MONA or Hodges number for Bleptina minimalis is 8374.
