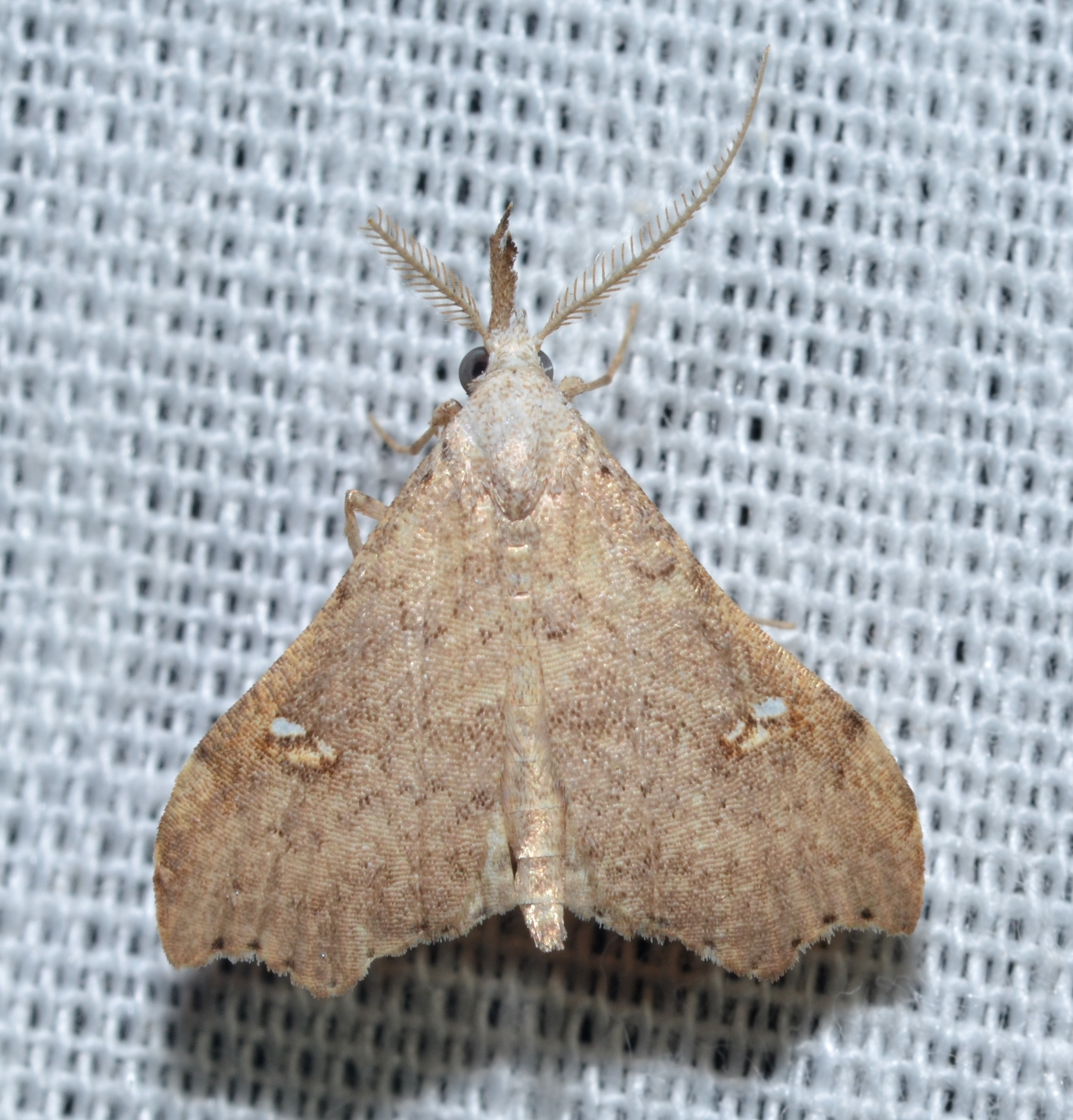

Scientific classification
- Kingdom: Animalia
- Phylum: Arthropoda
- Class: Insecta
- Order: Lepidoptera
- Superfamily: Noctuoidea
- Family: Erebidae
- Genus: Redectis
- Species: R. vitrea

Binomial name
- Redectis vitrea (Grote, 1878)

Synonyms
- Dercetis vitrea Grote, 1878

= Redectis vitrea =

Species of moth

Redectis vitrea, the scalloped snout or white-spotted redectis, is a litter moth of the family Erebidae. The species was first described by Augustus Radcliffe Grote in 1878. It is found in the United States from Illinois to south-eastern Massachusetts, south to Texas and Florida.

The wingspan is about 18 mm. Adults are on wing from June to October. There are two generations per year in Virginia.

The larvae feed on various plants, including Elaeagnus umbellata, Ceanothus americanus and Digitaria species.
