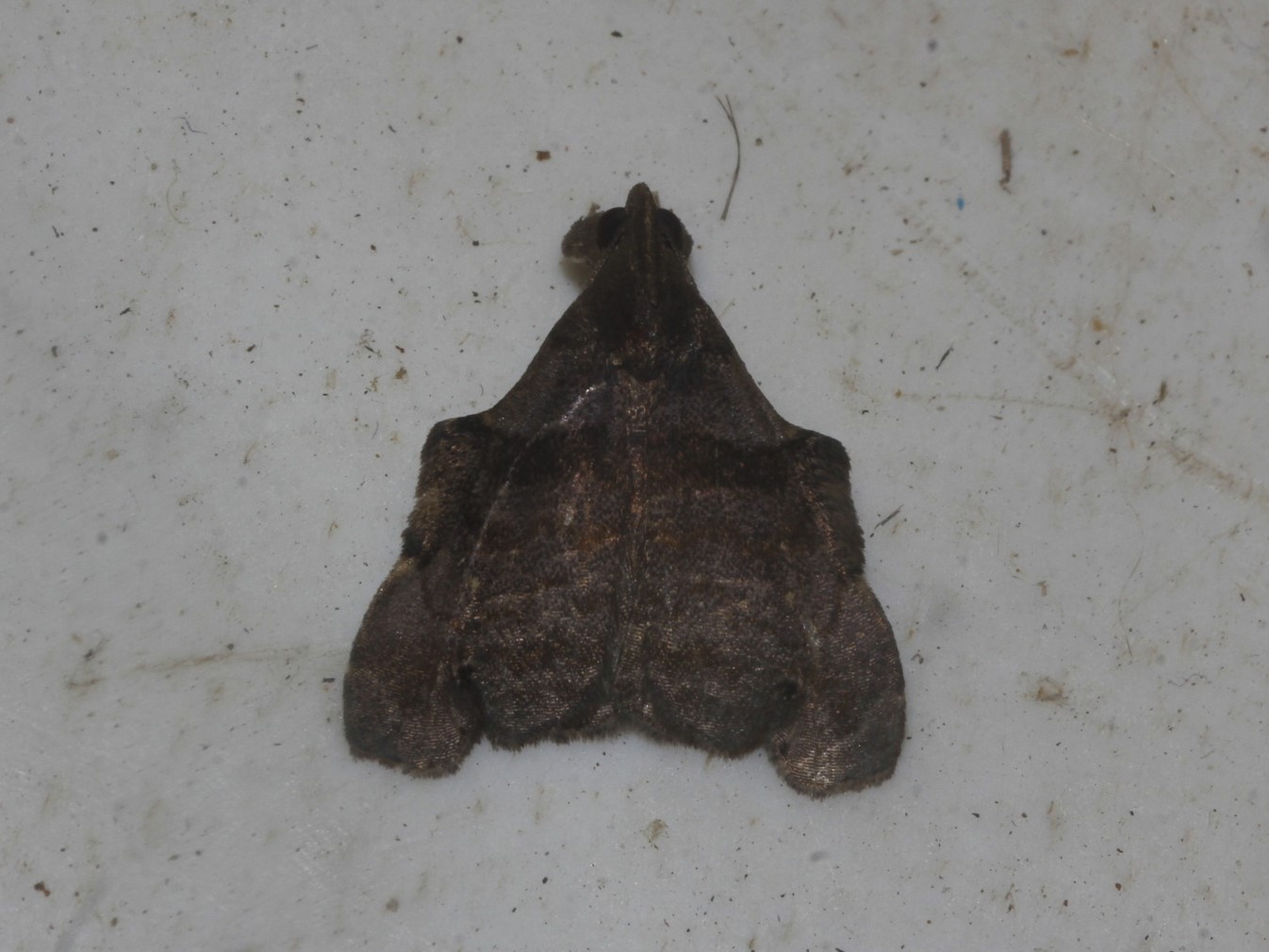

Scientific classification
- Kingdom: Animalia
- Phylum: Arthropoda
- Class: Insecta
- Order: Lepidoptera
- Superfamily: Noctuoidea
- Family: Erebidae
- Genus: Lascoria
- Species: L. orneodalis

Binomial name
- Lascoria orneodalis Guenée, 1854

Synonyms
- Herminia tagusalis Walker 1859

= Lascoria orneodalis =

Species of moth

Lascoria orneodalis is a species of litter moth in the family Erebidae. It is found in tropical and subtropical America.

The larvae feed on species of Lycopersicon.
