= Bleptina flaviguttalis =

Scientific classification
- Kingdom: Animalia
- Phylum: Arthropoda
- Class: Insecta
- Order: Lepidoptera
- Superfamily: Noctuoidea
- Family: Erebidae
- Genus: Bleptina
- Species: B. flaviguttalis

Binomial name
- Bleptina flaviguttalis Barnes & McDunnough, 1912

Species of moth

Bleptina flaviguttalis is a species of litter moth in the family Erebidae first described by William Barnes and James Halliday McDunnough in 1912. It is found in North America.

The MONA or Hodges number for Bleptina flaviguttalis is 8373.
