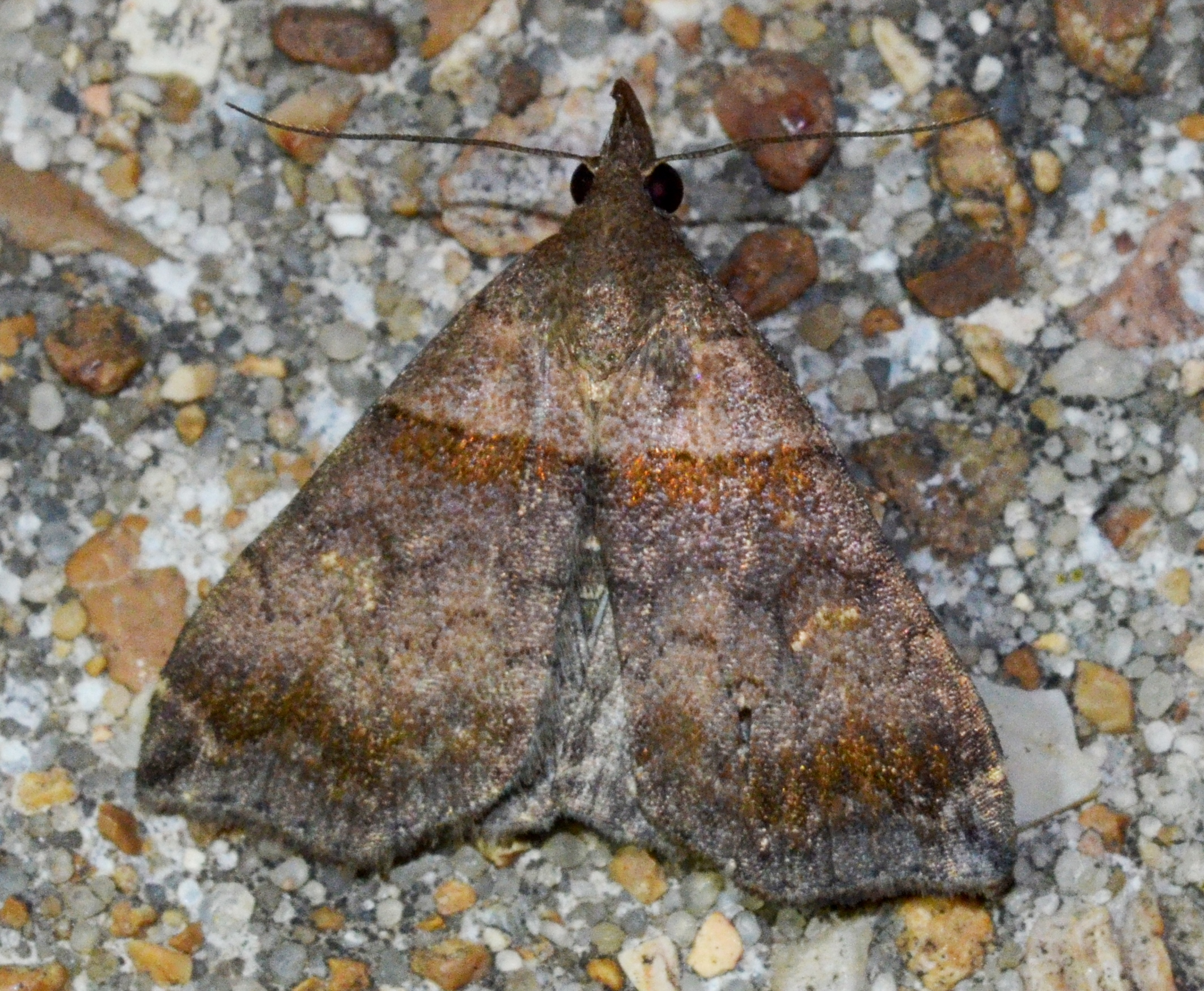

Scientific classification
- Kingdom: Animalia
- Phylum: Arthropoda
- Class: Insecta
- Order: Lepidoptera
- Superfamily: Noctuoidea
- Family: Erebidae
- Genus: Lascoria
- Species: L. ambigualis

Binomial name
- Lascoria ambigualis Walker, 1866

Synonyms
- Lascoria bifidalis (Grote, 1872); Lascoria indivisalis (Grote, 1872)

= Lascoria ambigualis =

Species of moth

Lascoria ambigualis, the ambiguous moth, is a litter moth of the family Erebidae. The species was first described by Francis Walker in 1866. Adults are on wing from April to September. There are two generations in Connecticut and multiple broods in Missouri.

== Description ==
The ambiguous moth has a wingspan of 21–25 mm and rests with its hindwings tucked behind its forewings, giving the moth a triangular shape. Individuals vary slightly in coloration, with the forewings being brown, slightly purple, or shades of gray, though they share a dark, straight band across their wings. This band is a clear divider between the light-colored head and thoracic area and the darker, lower portion of the wings. This species displays sexual dimorphism, with the males having a notch in distal edge of the wing and a black spot at the head of the notch, both of which are absent in females

== Range and Habitat ==
L. ambigualis is found in the US from Wisconsin to Maine, south to Florida and Texas. They can be found in a wide variety of habitats, but are most commonly observed in shrubby fields, woodlands, and forests.

== Ecology ==
The larvae feed on Chrysanthemum species, as well as Aster, blackberry and Verbesina. Larvae have also been reared on dead leaves.
