= Phalaenostola hanhami =

Scientific classification
- Domain: Eukaryota
- Kingdom: Animalia
- Phylum: Arthropoda
- Class: Insecta
- Order: Lepidoptera
- Superfamily: Noctuoidea
- Family: Erebidae
- Genus: Phalaenostola
- Species: P. hanhami

Binomial name
- Phalaenostola hanhami (J. B. Smith, 1899)

Species of moth

Phalaenostola hanhami, also called Hanham's owlet or Hanham's snout moth, is a litter moth of the family Erebidae. The species was first described by J. B. Smith in 1899. It is found in North America from Nova Scotia, west across Canada to central Alberta, south to Massachusetts and New York.

The wingspan is 22–25 mm. Adults are on wing from June to August.
