= Hypenula caminalis =

Scientific classification
- Kingdom: Animalia
- Phylum: Arthropoda
- Clade: Pancrustacea
- Class: Insecta
- Order: Lepidoptera
- Superfamily: Noctuoidea
- Family: Erebidae
- Genus: Hypenula
- Species: H. caminalis

Binomial name
- Hypenula caminalis Smith, 1905

Species of moth

Hypenula caminalis is a species of litter moth in the family Erebidae. It is found in North America.
