= Lascoria naupalis =

Scientific classification
- Domain: Eukaryota
- Kingdom: Animalia
- Phylum: Arthropoda
- Class: Insecta
- Order: Lepidoptera
- Superfamily: Noctuoidea
- Family: Erebidae
- Genus: Lascoria
- Species: L. naupalis

Binomial name
- Lascoria naupalis Schaus, 1916

Species of moth

Lascoria naupalis is a species of litter moth of the family Erebidae first described by William Schaus in 1916. It is found in South America, including Brazil.
