= Lascoria antigone =

Scientific classification
- Domain: Eukaryota
- Kingdom: Animalia
- Phylum: Arthropoda
- Class: Insecta
- Order: Lepidoptera
- Superfamily: Noctuoidea
- Family: Erebidae
- Genus: Lascoria
- Species: L. antigone

Binomial name
- Lascoria antigone Schaus, 1916

Species of moth

Lascoria antigone is a species of litter moth of the family Erebidae. It is found in Central and South America, including Suriname and Costa Rica.
