= Maronia celadon =

Scientific classification
- Kingdom: Animalia
- Phylum: Arthropoda
- Clade: Pancrustacea
- Class: Insecta
- Order: Lepidoptera
- Superfamily: Noctuoidea
- Family: Erebidae
- Subfamily: Herminiinae
- Genus: Maronia; Schaus, 1916
- Species: M. celadon

Binomial name
- Maronia celadon Schaus, 1916

Species of moth

Maronia celadon is the only species in the monotypic moth genus Maronia of the family Erebidae. It is known from French Guiana. Both the genus and species were first described by William Schaus in 1916.
