= Physula =

Scientific classification
- Domain: Eukaryota
- Kingdom: Animalia
- Phylum: Arthropoda
- Class: Insecta
- Order: Lepidoptera
- Superfamily: Noctuoidea
- Family: Erebidae
- Subfamily: Herminiinae
- Genus: Physula; Guenee, 1854

Synonyms
- Metacinia Schaus, 1913

Genus of moths

Physula is a genus of litter moths of the family Erebidae.

== Selected species ==
- Physula acutalis Herrich-Schaffer, 1870
- Physula albipunctilla Schaus, 1916
- Physula albirenalis Herrich-Schaffer, 1870
- Physula anchisa (Druce, 1891)
- Physula apicalis Herrich-Schaffer, 1870
- Physula aristina Schaus, 1916
- Physula cristina Schaus, 1916
- Physula ecuadoralis Schaus, 1916
- Physula herminialis Herrich-Schaffer, 1870
- Physula inscitalis Schaus, 1916
- Physula limonalis (Schaus, 1913)
- Physula margotalis (Schaus, 1906)
- Physula migralis Guenee, 1854
- Physula novitata Kaye, 1901
- Physula paganacalis Schaus, 1916
- Physula peckii Moschler, 1890
- Physula rona (Schaus, 1912)
- Physula synnaralis Guenee, 1862
- Physula tristigatalis Herrich-Schaffer, 1870
- Physula variegalis Herrich-Schaffer, 1870
