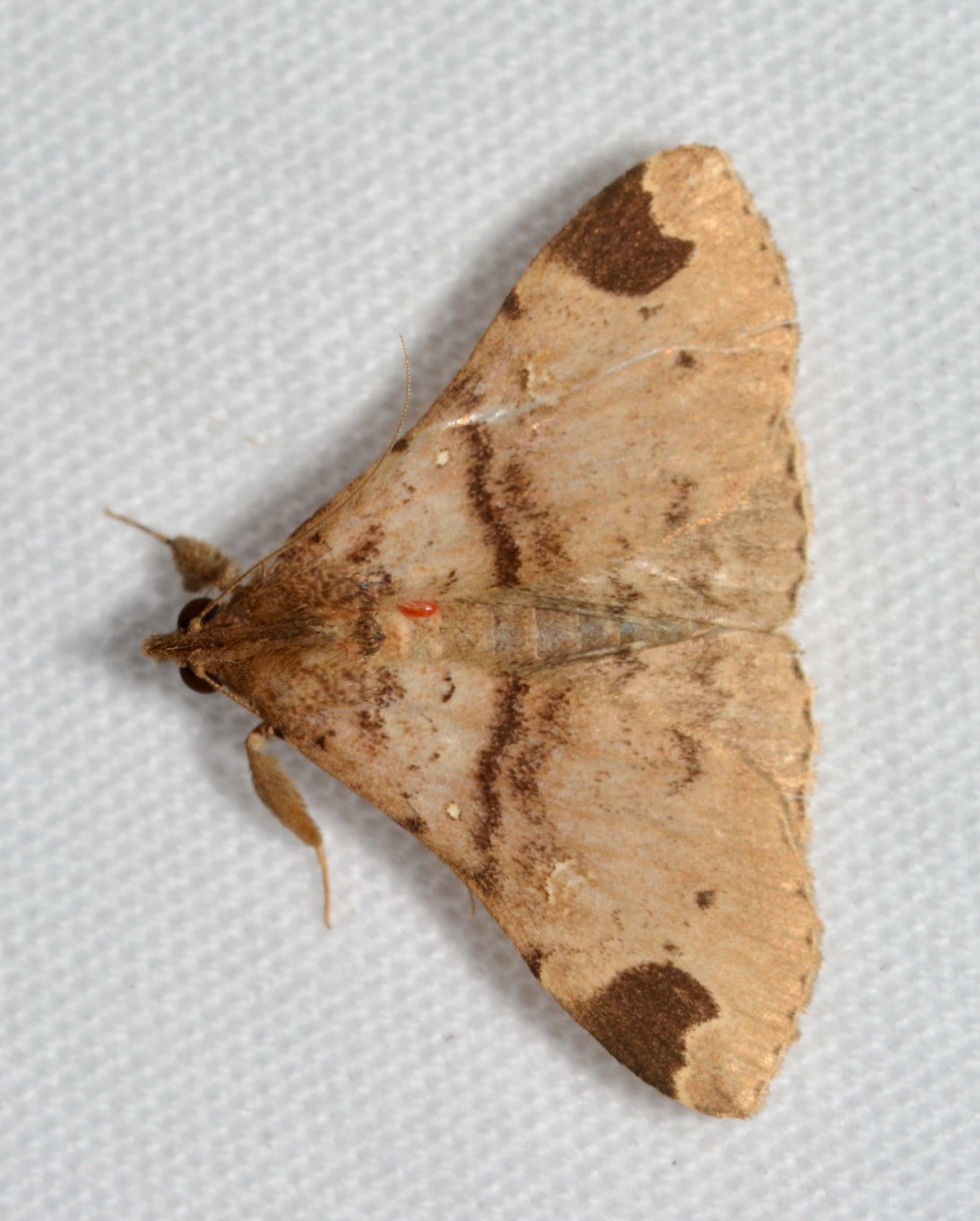
- Rejectaria aratus

Scientific classification
- Kingdom: Animalia
- Phylum: Arthropoda
- Clade: Pancrustacea
- Class: Insecta
- Order: Lepidoptera
- Superfamily: Noctuoidea
- Family: Erebidae
- Subfamily: Herminiinae
- Genus: Rejectaria; Guenée in Boisduval & Guenée, 1854

Synonyms
- Blemmatia Herrich-Schäffer, 1870; Narcaea H. Druce, 1891; Theotinus H. Druce, 1891

= Rejectaria =

Genus of moths

Rejectaria is a genus of litter moths of the family Erebidae. The genus was erected by Achille Guenée in 1854.

== Species ==
- Rejectaria albisinuata (Smith, 1905) Arizona
- Rejectaria amicalis (Maassen, 1890) Ecuador
- Rejectaria antorides (H. Druce, 1891) Costa Rica
- Rejectaria anysis (H. Druce, 1891) Mexico, Panama
- Rejectaria aratus (H. Druce, 1891) Panama
- Rejectaria arenacea (Schaus, 1913) Costa Rica
- Rejectaria atrax (Dognin, 1891) Ecuador
- Rejectaria carapa (Felder & Rogenhofer, 1874) Brazil (Amazonas)
- Rejectaria chisena (Schaus, 1906) Brazil (Paraná)
- Rejectaria cocytalis Guenée, 1854 Cayenne, Venezuela
- Rejectaria craftsalis Schaus, 1916 Panama
- Rejectaria cucutalis Schaus, 1916 Venezuela
- Rejectaria erebalis Guenée, 1854 Brazil
- Rejectaria fulvibrunnea (Dognin, 1914) Peru
- Rejectaria funebris (Schaus, 1912) Costa Rica, French Guiana
- Rejectaria gallinalis (Felder & Rogenhofer, 1874) Venezuela
- Rejectaria incola Dognin, 1914 Ecuador
- Rejectaria lineata (Dognin, 1914) Peru
- Rejectaria lysandria (H. Druce, 1891) Mexico, Guatemala, Panama
- Rejectaria lyse (H. Druce, 1891) Panama
- Rejectaria maera (H. Druce, 1891) Panama
- Rejectaria magas (H. Druce, 1891) Panama
- Rejectaria niciasalis (Walker, [1859]) Brazil
- Rejectaria nucina (Dognin, 1914) Ecuador
- Rejectaria pallescens (Dognin, 1914) Peru
- Rejectaria panola Schaus, 1933 Brazil (Paraná)
- Rejectaria parvipunctalis Schaus, 1916 Brazil (Espírito Santo)
- Rejectaria paulosa (Schaus, 1906) Brazil (São Paulo)
- Rejectaria pharusalis (Walker, [1859]) Venezuela
- Rejectaria prunescens (Warren, 1889) Brazil (Amazonas)
- Rejectaria rosimonalis (Walker, [1859]) Venezuela
- Rejectaria splendida (Schaus, 1912) Costa Rica
- Rejectaria theclalis (Walker, [1859]) Brazil (Amazonas)
- Rejectaria villavicencia Dognin, 1924 Colombia
- Rejectaria villosa (H. Druce, 1891) Panama
- Rejectaria virbiusalis (Walker, [1859]) Venezuela
- Rejectaria zenos Schaus, 1916 Cayenne
