= Bleptina araealis =

Scientific classification
- Kingdom: Animalia
- Phylum: Arthropoda
- Class: Insecta
- Order: Lepidoptera
- Superfamily: Noctuoidea
- Family: Erebidae
- Genus: Bleptina
- Species: B. araealis

Binomial name
- Bleptina araealis Hampson, 1901

Species of moth

Bleptina araealis is a species of moth in the family Erebidae. It was described by George Hampson in 1901. It occurs in Florida and the Antilles.
