= Aristaria =

Scientific classification
- Kingdom: Animalia
- Phylum: Arthropoda
- Class: Insecta
- Order: Lepidoptera
- Superfamily: Noctuoidea
- Family: Erebidae
- Subfamily: Herminiinae
- Genus: Aristaria; Guenée, 1854

Genus of moths

Aristaria is a genus of moths of the family Erebidae. It is monotypic, containing only the species Aristaria theroalis, which is found in the United States and Costa Rica.
