= Rejectaria albisinuata =

Scientific classification
- Kingdom: Animalia
- Phylum: Arthropoda
- Clade: Pancrustacea
- Class: Insecta
- Order: Lepidoptera
- Superfamily: Noctuoidea
- Family: Erebidae
- Genus: Rejectaria
- Species: R. albisinuata

Binomial name
- Rejectaria albisinuata Smith, 1905

Species of moth

Rejectaria albisinuata is a species of cutworm in the moth family Noctuidae. It is found in North America.
