= Lophophora (moth) =

Scientific classification
- Kingdom: Animalia
- Phylum: Arthropoda
- Clade: Pancrustacea
- Class: Insecta
- Order: Lepidoptera
- Superfamily: Noctuoidea
- Family: Erebidae
- Subfamily: Herminiinae
- Genus: Lophophora; Möschler, 1890

Genus of moths

Lophophora is a genus of moths of the family Erebidae.

Species:

- Lophophora clanymoides
- Lophophora evan
- Lophophora latipennis
- Lophophora thaumasalis
