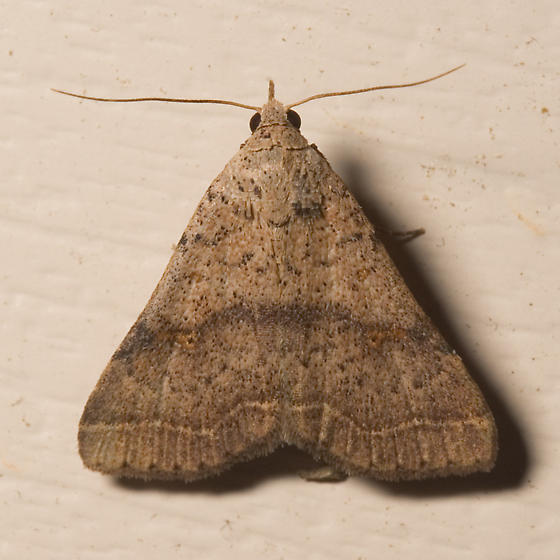
- Bleptina caradrinalis

Scientific classification
- Kingdom: Animalia
- Phylum: Arthropoda
- Class: Insecta
- Order: Lepidoptera
- Superfamily: Noctuoidea
- Family: Erebidae
- Subfamily: Herminiinae
- Genus: Bleptina; Guenée in Boisduval & Guenée, 1854

Synonyms
- Opotura Walker, [1859]; Anagoa Möschler, 1886

= Bleptina =

Genus of moths

Bleptina is a genus of litter moths of the family Erebidae. It was erected by Achille Guenée in 1854.

== Description ==
Palpi with second joint reaching far above vertex of head. Third joint long with a tuft of hair on inner side. Antennae fasciculated (bundled) in male. Thorax and abdomen smoothly scaled. Forewings with somewhat acute apex. Veins 8 and 9 anastomosing (fusing) to form the areole, which is short and broad or long and narrow. Vein 10 sometimes given off beyond it. Hindwings with vein 5 from near lower angle of cell.

== Species ==
- Bleptina acastusalis Walker, [1859] Puerto Rico
- Bleptina aeatusalis Walker, 1859 Brazil (Rio de Janeiro)
- Bleptina albidiscalis Warren, 1889 Brazil (Amazonas)
- Bleptina antinoe Druce, 1891 Panama
- Bleptina araealis (Hampson, 1901) Florida, Antilles
- Bleptina athusalis Schaus, 1916 Cuba
- Bleptina atymnusalis (Walker, [1859])
- Bleptina baracoana Schaus, 1916 Cuba
- Bleptina bogesalis Walker, 1859 Brazil (Rio de Janeiro)
- Bleptina caradrinalis Guenée, 1854 southern US - Brazil, Antilles, Venezuela, Puerto Rico – bent-winged owlet moth
- Bleptina carlona Schaus, 1916 Cuba
- Bleptina clara Schaus, 1906 Brazil (Paraná)
- Bleptina confusalis Guenée, 1854 Brazil, Venezuela
- Bleptina confusaloides Poole, 1989 Venezuela
- Bleptina cryptoleuca Prout, 1921 eastern Zaire
- Bleptina dejecta Schaus, 1916 French Guiana
- Bleptina diopis (Hampson, 1904) Bahamas
- Bleptina eminens Schaus, 1916 French Guiana
- Bleptina fasciata Dognin, 1914 Colombia
- Bleptina flaviguttalis Barnes & McDunnough, 1912 Arizona
- Bleptina frontalis Walker, 1862 southern Africa
- Bleptina hydrillalis Guenée, 1854 southern US, Central America, Antilles
- Bleptina infausta Schaus, 1913 Costa Rica
- Bleptina inferior Grote, 1872 Florida, Alabama, Texas
- Bleptina intractalis Walker, 1862 southern Africa
- Bleptina lasaea Druce, 1891 Panama, Costa Rica
- Bleptina latona Schaus, 1916 French Guiana
- Bleptina madopalis Guenée, 1854
- Bleptina malia Druce, 1891 Panama
- Bleptina menalcasalis Walker, [1859] Antilles - Venezuela
- Bleptina minimalis Barnes & McDunnough, 1912 Arizona
- Bleptina muricolor Schaus, 1916 Cuba
- Bleptina nisosalis Walker, [1859]
- Bleptina niveigutta Schaus, 1916 French Guiana
- Bleptina obscura Schaus, 1913 Costa Rica
- Bleptina olearos Dognin, 1914 Colombia
- Bleptina ophelasalis Walker, 1859 Brazil (Rio de Janeiro)
- Bleptina pentheusalis Walker, [1859] Venezuela
- Bleptina pithosalis Walker, [1859]
- Bleptina pollesalis Walker, 1859 Brazil (Rio de Janeiro)
- Bleptina pudesta Schaus, 1916 Cuba
- Bleptina sangamonia Barnes & McDunnough, 1912 Illinois
- Bleptina styrusalis Walker, 1859 Brazil (Rio de Janeiro)
- Bleptina syrnialis Guenée, 1854 Brazil
- Bleptina tenebrosa Mabille, 1900
- Bleptina vultura Schaus, 1916 Venezuela
