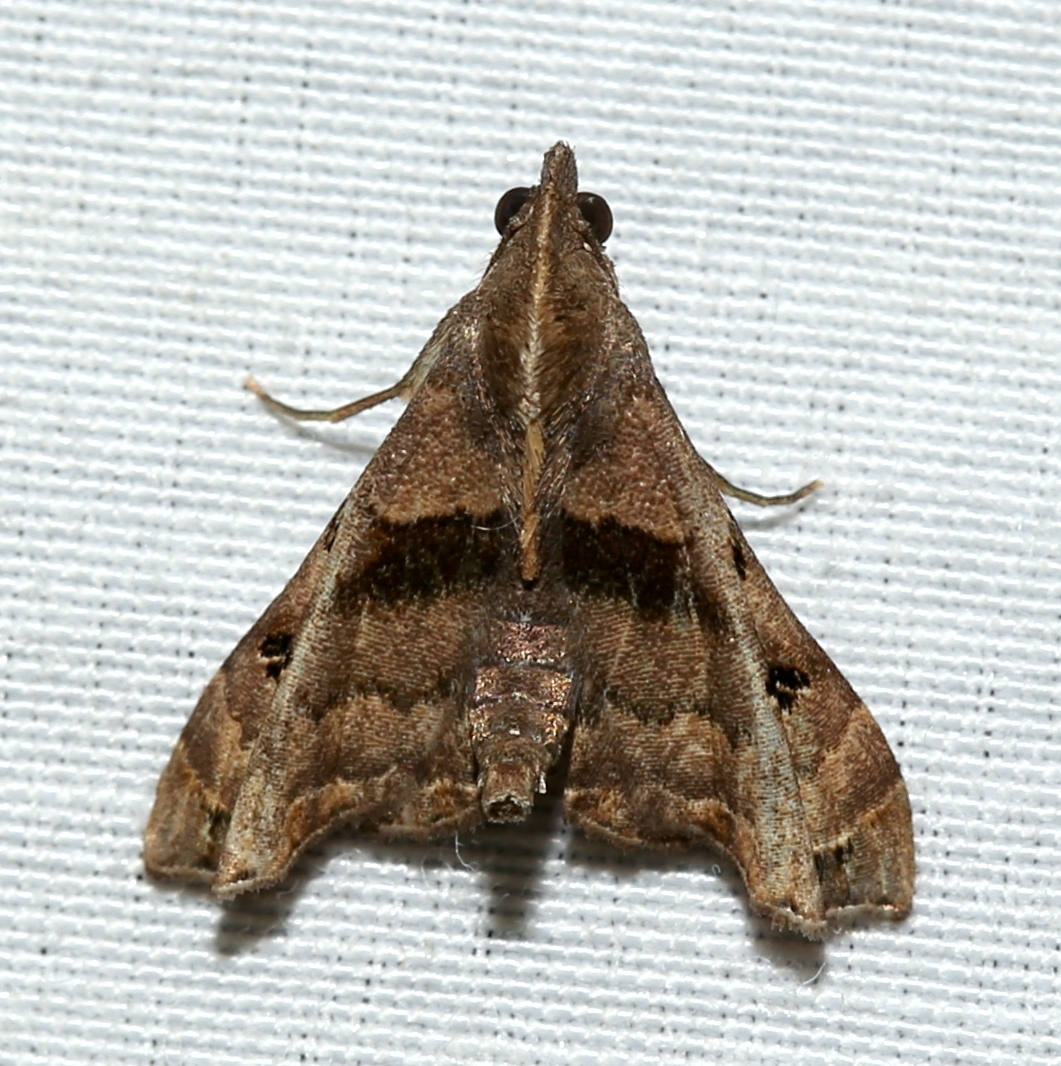

Scientific classification
- Kingdom: Animalia
- Phylum: Arthropoda
- Class: Insecta
- Order: Lepidoptera
- Superfamily: Noctuoidea
- Family: Erebidae
- Genus: Palthis
- Species: P. asopialis

Binomial name
- Palthis asopialis Guenée, 1854

Synonyms
- Bertula insignalis

= Palthis asopialis =

Species of moth

Palthis asopialis, the faint-spotted palthis moth, is a moth of the family Erebidae. The species was first described by Achille Guenée in 1854. It is found in North America, from Florida north to Ontario and west to Texas.

The wingspan is 19–23 mm. The moth flies from January to October depending on the location. There are at least two generations in the north-east. There are more generations in the south.

Recorded food plants include Bidens species, and the leaves of beans, corn, and oak.
