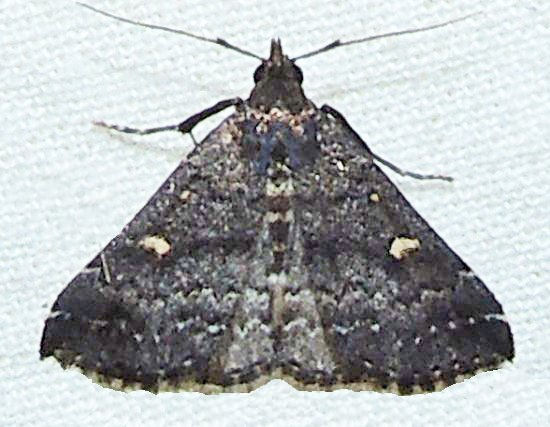

Scientific classification
- Kingdom: Animalia
- Phylum: Arthropoda
- Class: Insecta
- Order: Lepidoptera
- Superfamily: Noctuoidea
- Family: Erebidae
- Genus: Hypenula
- Species: H. cacuminalis

Binomial name
- Hypenula cacuminalis (Walker, 1859)

Synonyms
- Hypena cacuminalis Walker, [1859]; Herminia biferalis Walker 1859; Hypenula opacalis Grote 1876

= Hypenula cacuminalis =

Species of moth

Hypenula cacuminalis, the long-horned owlet moth, is a moth of the family Erebidae. The species was first described by Francis Walker in 1859. It is found from the south-eastern United States west to Texas and Arizona.

The length of the forewings is 13–14 mm. Adults are mostly on wing from May to August, but have been recorded on wing from January to November in Florida. There are multiple generations per year in the southern part of the range.
