= Drepanopalpia =

Scientific classification
- Kingdom: Animalia
- Phylum: Arthropoda
- Class: Insecta
- Order: Lepidoptera
- Superfamily: Noctuoidea
- Family: Erebidae
- Subfamily: Herminiinae
- Genus: Drepanopalpia; Hampson, 1898

Genus of moths

Drepanopalpia is a genus of litter moths of the family Erebidae. The genus was erected by George Hampson in 1898.

== Species ==
- Drepanopalpia cassida Dognin, 1914
- Drepanopalpia lunifera (Butler, 1878)
