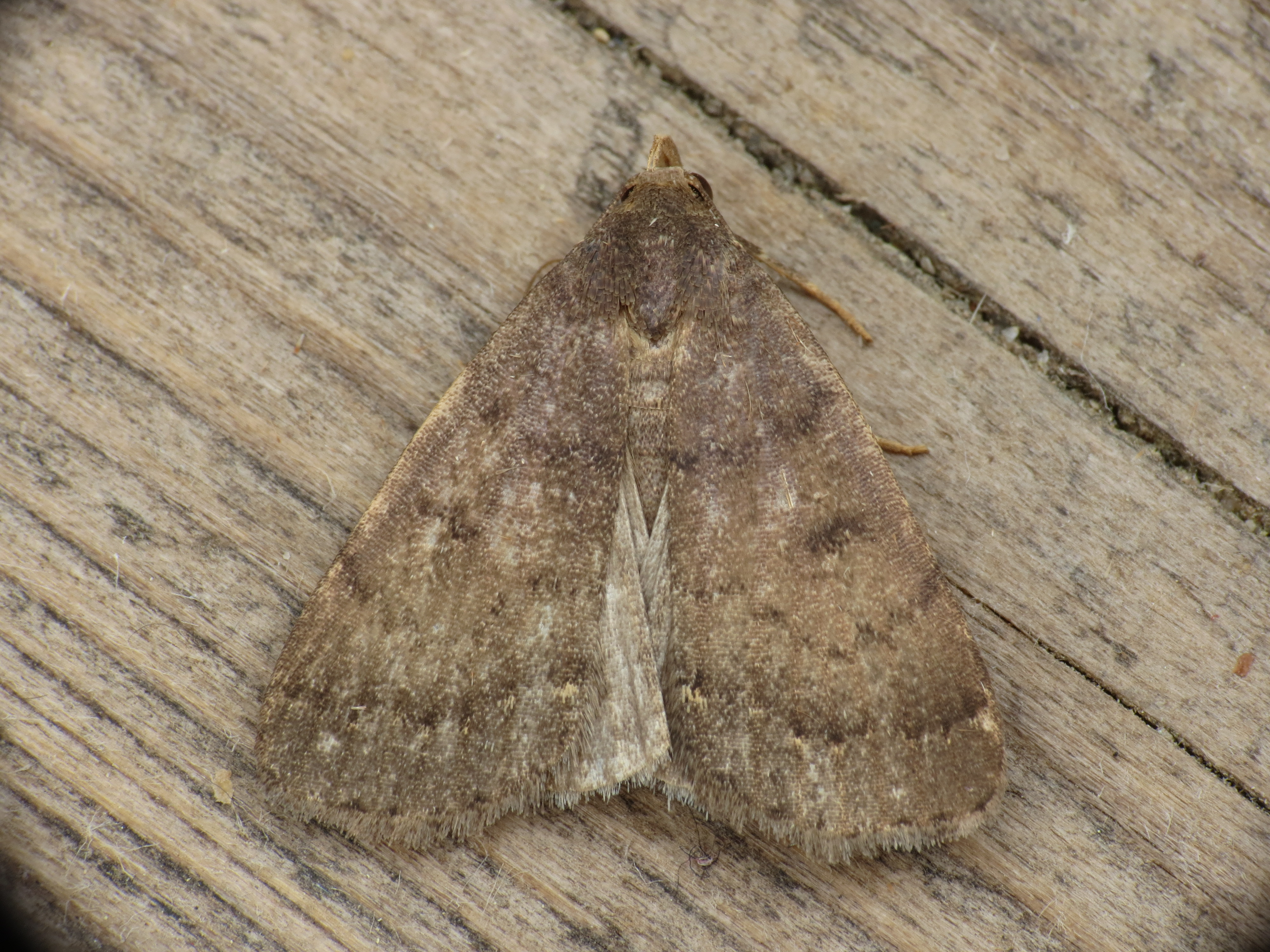
- Nodaria nodosalis

Scientific classification
- Kingdom: Animalia
- Phylum: Arthropoda
- Clade: Pancrustacea
- Class: Insecta
- Order: Lepidoptera
- Superfamily: Noctuoidea
- Family: Erebidae
- Subfamily: Herminiinae
- Genus: Nodaria; Guenée, 1854

Synonyms
- Anitha Walker, 1866

= Nodaria =

Genus of moths

Nodaria is a genus of moths in the family Erebidae described by Achille Guenée in 1854.

== Description ==
Palpi with second joint reaching above vertex of head. Third joint with a tuft of hair on inner side, usually in the males only. Antennae of males with long bristles and cilia. Thorax and abdomen smoothly scaled. Forewings with rectangular apex. The outer margin rounded. Veins 7 to 10 stalked, often with a minute areole at their base. Hindwings with veins 3,4 and 6,7 from angles of cell or on short stalks. Vein 5 from near middle of discocellulars.

== Species ==
- Nodaria adra Swinhoe, 1918
- Nodaria angulata Wileman & West, 1930
- Nodaria arcuata Wileman & West, 1930
- Nodaria assimilata Wileman, 1911
- Nodaria cidarioides Hampson, 1891
- Nodaria cinerea de Joannis, 1929
- Nodaria cingala Moore, 1885
- Nodaria cornicalis Fabricius, 1794
- Nodaria dentilineata Draeseke, 1928
- Nodaria dinawa Bethune-Baker, 1908
- Nodaria discisigna Moore, 1883
- Nodaria discolor Wileman & West, 1930
- Nodaria dubiefae Viette, 1982
- Nodaria epiplemoides Strand, 1920
- Nodaria factitia Swinhoe, 1890
- Nodaria flavicosta de Joannis, 1929
- Nodaria flavifusca Hampson
- Nodaria formosana Strand, 1919
- Nodaria grisea Hampson, 1916
- Nodaria insipidalis Wileman, 1915
- Nodaria lophobela D. S. Fletcher, 1961
- Nodaria melaleuca Hampson, 1902
- Nodaria melanopa Bethune-Baker, 1911
- Nodaria niphona Butler, 1878
- Nodaria nodosalis Herrich-Schäffer, 1851
- Nodaria pacifica Hampson
- Nodaria papuana Hampson
- Nodaria parallela Bethune-Baker, 1911
- Nodaria parallela Wileman, 1911
- Nodaria praetextata Leech, 1900
- Nodaria similis Moore, 1882
- Nodaria stellaris Butler
- Nodaria terminalis Wileman, 1915
- Nodaria tristis Butler, 1879
- Nodaria tristis Hampson, 1891
- Nodaria turpalis Mabille, 1900
- Nodaria unicolor Wileman & South, 1917
- Nodaria unipuncta Wileman, 1915
- Nodaria verticalis D. S. Fletcher, 1961
