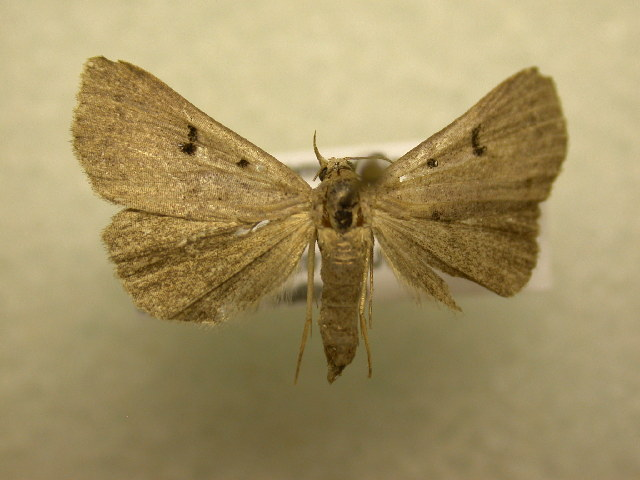

Scientific classification
- Kingdom: Animalia
- Phylum: Arthropoda
- Clade: Pancrustacea
- Class: Insecta
- Order: Lepidoptera
- Superfamily: Noctuoidea
- Family: Erebidae
- Genus: Bleptina
- Species: B. inferior

Binomial name
- Bleptina inferior Grote, 1872

Synonyms
- Bleptina medialis Smith, 1895

= Bleptina inferior =

Species of moth

Bleptina inferior, the inferior owlet moth, is a species of moth in the family Erebidae. It was described by Augustus Radcliffe Grote in 1872 and is found in North America, where it has been recorded from Iowa to Massachusetts, south to Texas and Florida.

The wingspan is 22–26 mm.

The MONA or Hodges number for Bleptina inferior is 8371.
