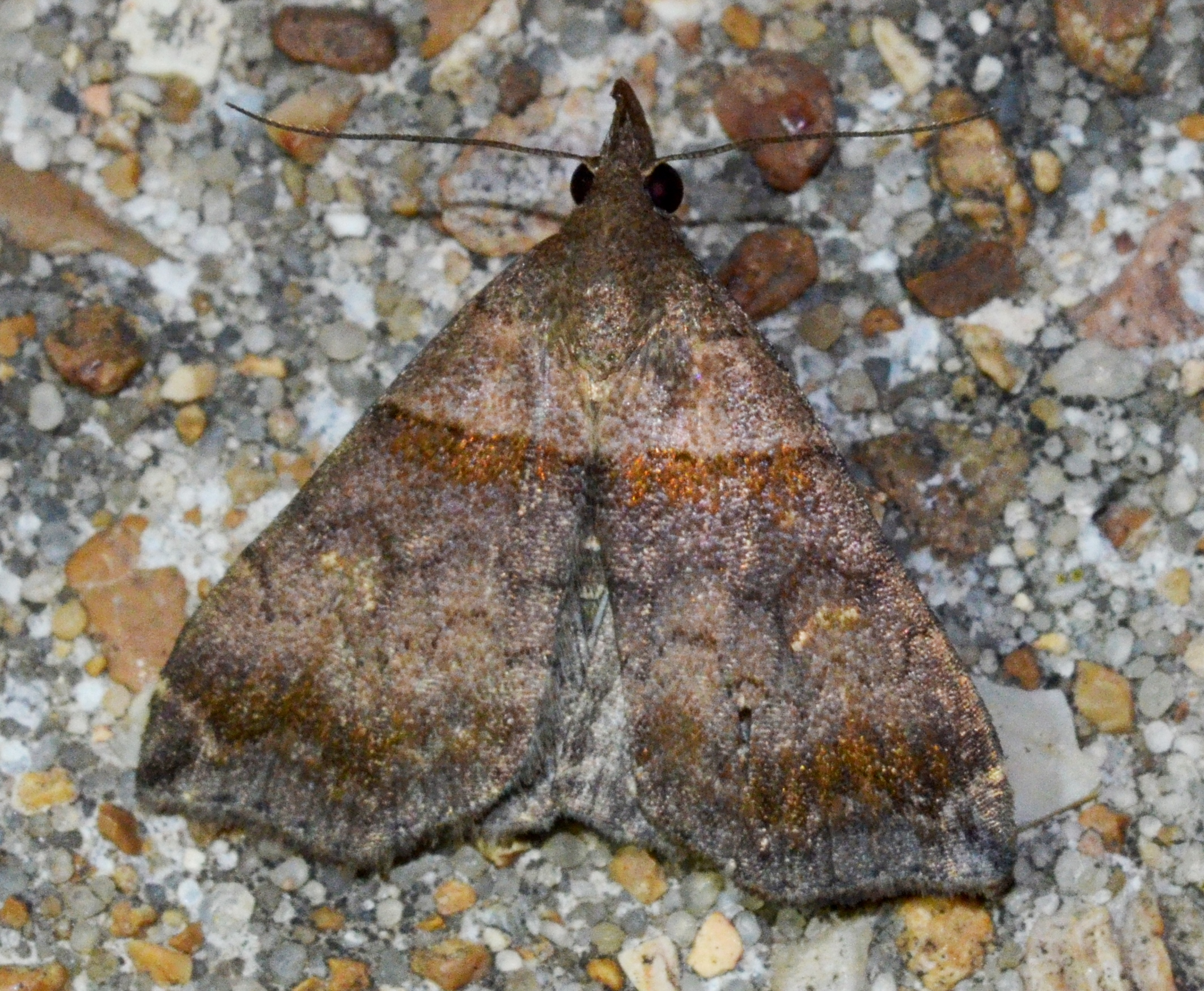
- Lascoria ambigualis

Scientific classification
- Kingdom: Animalia
- Phylum: Arthropoda
- Clade: Pancrustacea
- Class: Insecta
- Order: Lepidoptera
- Superfamily: Noctuoidea
- Family: Erebidae
- Subfamily: Herminiinae
- Genus: Lascoria; Walker, 1859

Synonyms
- Tortricodes Guenée, 1854; Gaberasa Walker, 1866; Eulintneria Grote, 1882; Epitomiptera Kaye, 1923; Alberticodes Biezanko & Ruffinelli, 1963

= Lascoria =

Genus of moths

Lascoria is a genus of litter moths in the family Erebidae. The genus was erected by Francis Walker in 1859.

== Species ==
- Lascoria alucitalis Guenée, 1854
- Lascoria ambigualis Walker, 1866 – ambiguous moth
- Lascoria antigone Schaus, 1916
- Lascoria aon Druce, 1891
- Lascoria arenosa Schaus, 1916
- Lascoria cristata Schaus, 1916
- Lascoria maronialis Schaus, 1916
- Lascoria naupalis Schaus, 1916
- Lascoria nigrirena (Herrich-Schäffer, 1870)
- Lascoria nivea Schaus, 1916
- Lascoria orneodalis Guenée, 1854
- Lascoria paulensis (Schaus, 1906)
- Lascoria phormisalis Walker, 1859
- Lascoria purpurascens (Kaye, 1922)
