= Phlyctaina =

Scientific classification
- Domain: Eukaryota
- Kingdom: Animalia
- Phylum: Arthropoda
- Class: Insecta
- Order: Lepidoptera
- Superfamily: Noctuoidea
- Family: Erebidae
- Genus: Phlyctaina; Moschler, 1890
- Species: P. irrigualis

Binomial name
- Phlyctaina irrigualis Moschler, 1890

Genus of moths

Phlyctaina is a monotypic litter moth genus of the family Erebidae. Its only species, Phlyctaina irrigualis, is found in North America. Both the genus and species were first described by Heinrich Benno Möschler in 1890.

The MONA or Hodges number for Phlyctaina irrigualis is 8392.
