= Bleptina sangamonia =

Scientific classification
- Kingdom: Animalia
- Phylum: Arthropoda
- Clade: Pancrustacea
- Class: Insecta
- Order: Lepidoptera
- Superfamily: Noctuoidea
- Family: Erebidae
- Genus: Bleptina
- Species: B. sangamonia

Binomial name
- Bleptina sangamonia Barnes & McDunnough, 1912

Species of moth

Bleptina sangamonia is a species of moth of the family Erebidae first described by William Barnes and James Halliday McDunnough in 1912. It is found in the US from Illinois and Maryland, south to at least South Carolina.
