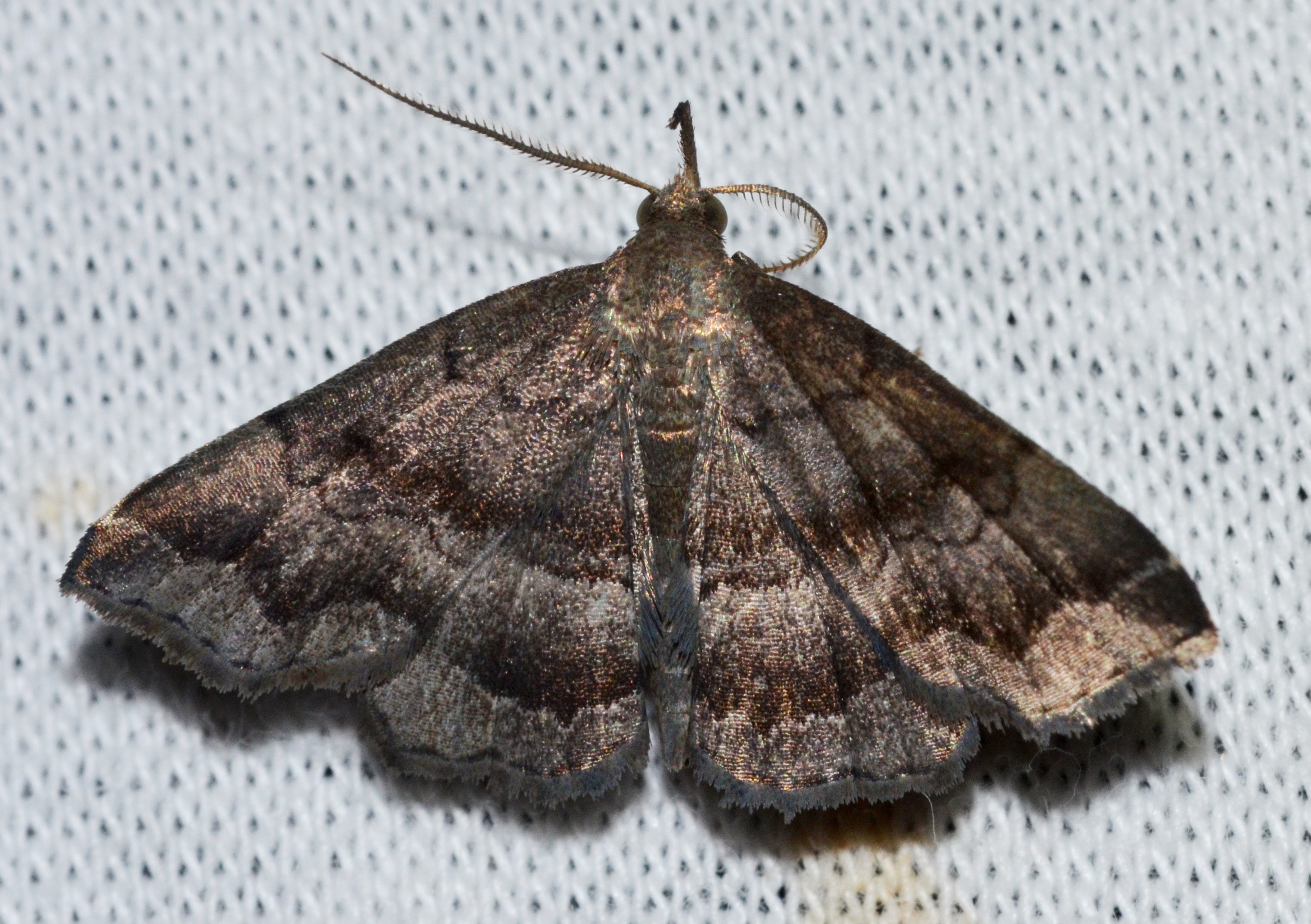

Scientific classification
- Kingdom: Animalia
- Phylum: Arthropoda
- Class: Insecta
- Order: Lepidoptera
- Superfamily: Noctuoidea
- Family: Erebidae
- Genus: Phalaenostola
- Species: P. larentioides

Binomial name
- Phalaenostola larentioides Grote, 1873

Synonyms
- Phalaenostola citima Grote, 1873

= Phalaenostola larentioides =

Species of moth

Phalaenostola larentioides, the black-banded owlet, is a moth of the family Erebidae. The species was first described by Augustus Radcliffe Grote in 1873. It is found in North America from New Brunswick and Wisconsin to Maine, south to Florida and Texas, west to Ontario.

The wingspan is 17 to 24 millimetres (0.67 to 0.94 in). Adults are on wing from May to September. There seem to be two or more generations per year.

The larvae feed on dead grass, leaf litter and living clover leaves.
