= Orectis =

Scientific classification
- Domain: Eukaryota
- Kingdom: Animalia
- Phylum: Arthropoda
- Class: Insecta
- Order: Lepidoptera
- Superfamily: Noctuoidea
- Family: Erebidae
- Subfamily: Herminiinae
- Genus: Orectis; Lederer, 1857

Genus of moths

Orectis is a genus of litter moths of the family Erebidae. The genus was erected by Julius Lederer in 1857.

== Species ==
- Orectis euprepiata Dannehl, 1933
- Orectis massiliensis Millière, 1863
- Orectis proboscidata Herrich-Schäffer, 1851
