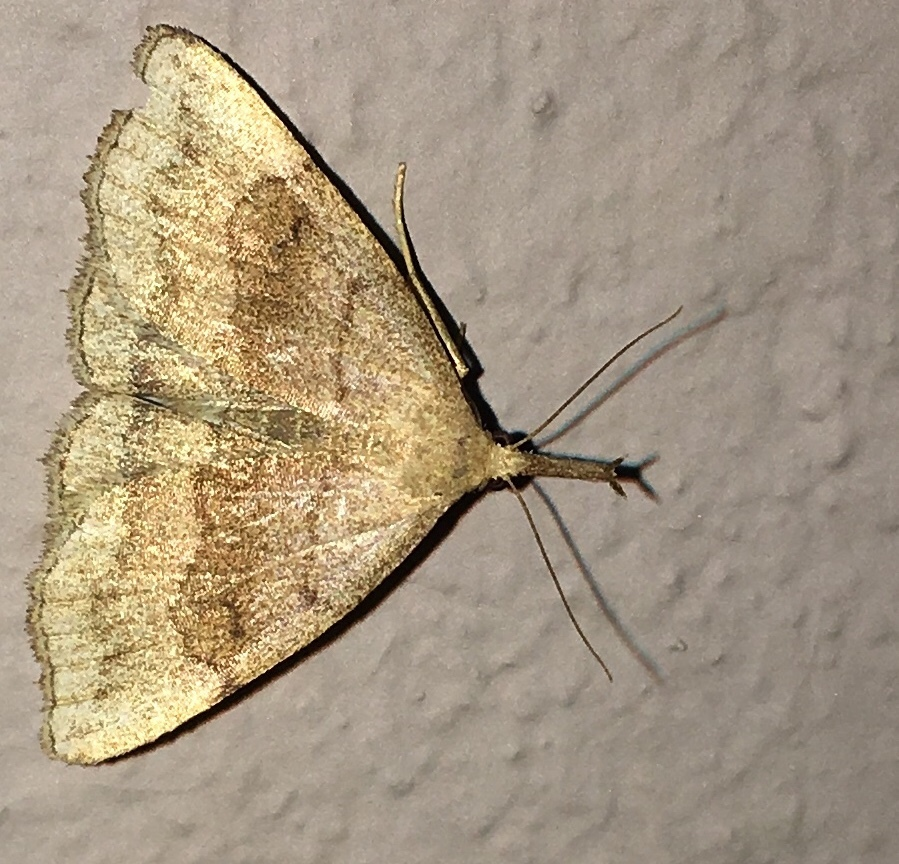

Scientific classification
- Kingdom: Animalia
- Phylum: Arthropoda
- Class: Insecta
- Order: Lepidoptera
- Superfamily: Noctuoidea
- Family: Erebidae
- Genus: Phalaenostola
- Species: P. metonalis

Binomial name
- Phalaenostola metonalis (Walker, 1859)

Synonyms
- Epidelta metonalis Walker, 1859; Phalaenostola gaosalis (Walker, 1859); Phalaenostola inceptaria (Walker, 1860); Phalaenostola effusalis (Walker, 1860); Phalaenostola longilabris (Grote, 1872); Herminia longilabris Grote, 1872

= Phalaenostola metonalis =

Species of moth

Phalaenostola metonalis, the pale phalaenostola, tufted snout or pale epidelta, is a moth of the family Erebidae. The species was first described by Francis Walker in 1859. It is found in North America from British Columbia to Newfoundland, south to North Carolina, west to Missouri.

The wingspan is 20–24 mm. Adults are on wing from June to September.

Larvae feed on dead grass and dead leaves of deciduous trees. Larvae have also been reared on dandelion and lettuce.
