= Macristis =

Scientific classification
- Domain: Eukaryota
- Kingdom: Animalia
- Phylum: Arthropoda
- Class: Insecta
- Order: Lepidoptera
- Superfamily: Noctuoidea
- Family: Erebidae
- Subfamily: Herminiinae
- Genus: Macristis; Schaus, 1916

Genus of moths

Macristis is a genus of litter moths of the family Erebidae. The genus was described by Schaus in 1916.

== Species ==
- Macristis bilinealis Barnes & McDunnough, 1912
- Macristis geminipunctalis Schaus, 1916
- Macristis pharosalis Schaus, 1916
- Macristis schausi Barnes & Benjamin, 1924
