= Redectis =

Scientific classification
- Domain: Eukaryota
- Kingdom: Animalia
- Phylum: Arthropoda
- Class: Insecta
- Order: Lepidoptera
- Superfamily: Noctuoidea
- Family: Erebidae
- Subfamily: Herminiinae
- Genus: Redectis; Nye, 1975

Genus of moths

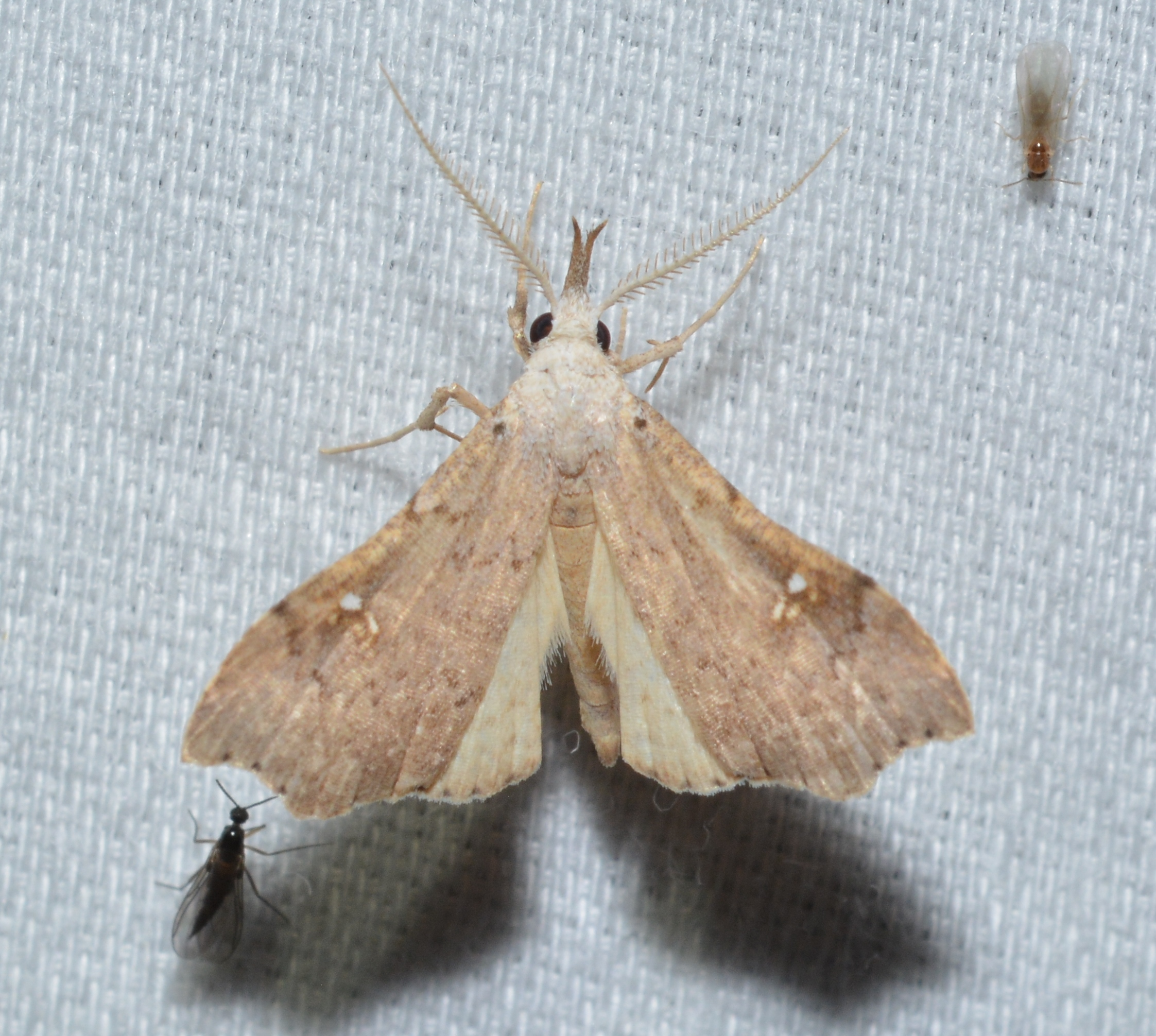
Redectis vitrea

Redectis is a genus of litter moths of the family Erebidae. The genus was described by Nye in 1975.

== Species ==
- Redectis iphias (Schaus, 1916) Cayenne
- Redectis perdiccas (Schaus, 1916) Panama
- Redectis polyidus (Schaus, 1916)
- Redectis pygmaea (Grote, 1878) Texas – pygmy redectis moth
- Redectis straminea (Hampson, 1926) Panama
- Redectis vitrea (Grote, 1878) New York – white-spotted redectis moth
