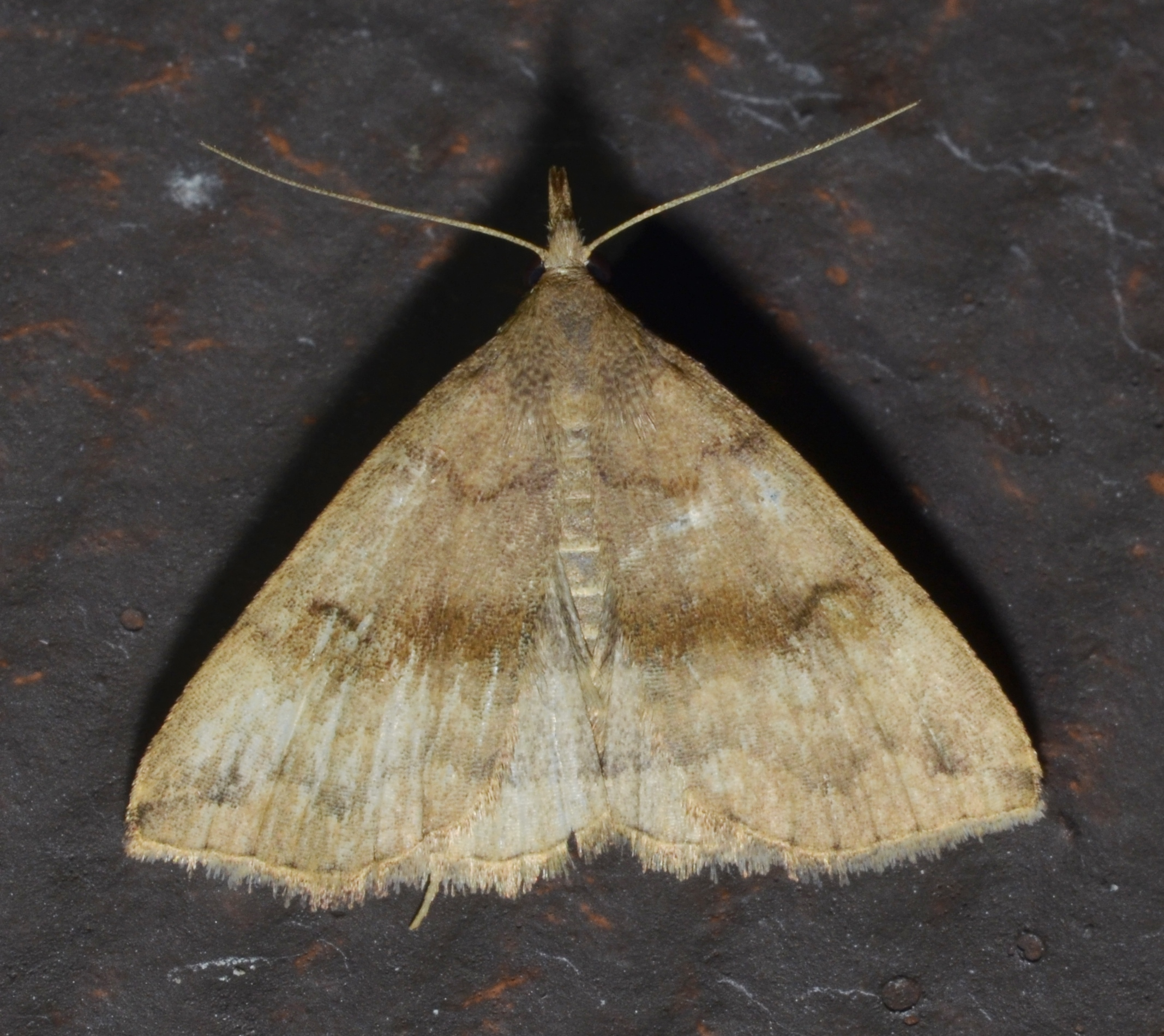

Scientific classification
- Kingdom: Animalia
- Phylum: Arthropoda
- Class: Insecta
- Order: Lepidoptera
- Superfamily: Noctuoidea
- Family: Erebidae
- Genus: Phalaenostola
- Species: P. eumelusalis

Binomial name
- Phalaenostola eumelusalis (Walker, 1859)

Synonyms
- Herminia eumelusalis Walker, 1859

= Phalaenostola eumelusalis =

Species of moth

Phalaenostola eumelusalis, the punctuated owlet or dark phalaenostola, is a moth of the family Erebidae. The species was first described by Francis Walker in 1859. It is found in North America from New Brunswick, North Dakota and South Dakota to Maine, south to Georgia and Iowa. In the north it is also found in Saskatchewan.

The wingspan is about 25 mm. Adults are on wing from May to August. There seem to be two generations per year.

Larvae have been reared on dead grass.
