= Physula albipunctilla =

Scientific classification
- Domain: Eukaryota
- Kingdom: Animalia
- Phylum: Arthropoda
- Class: Insecta
- Order: Lepidoptera
- Superfamily: Noctuoidea
- Family: Erebidae
- Genus: Physula
- Species: P. albipunctilla

Binomial name
- Physula albipunctilla Schaus, 1916

Species of moth

Physula albipunctilla is a species of moth in the family Erebidae first described by William Schaus in 1916. It can be found on the Antilles and Cuba, as well as Florida and Georgia.
