= Phalaenophana extremalis =

Scientific classification
- Kingdom: Animalia
- Phylum: Arthropoda
- Class: Insecta
- Order: Lepidoptera
- Superfamily: Noctuoidea
- Family: Erebidae
- Genus: Phalaenophana
- Species: P. extremalis

Binomial name
- Phalaenophana extremalis (Barnes & McDunnough, 1912)

Species of moth

Phalaenophana extremalis is a moth of the family Erebidae first described by William Barnes and James Halliday McDunnough in 1912. It is found in the US states of Arizona and New Mexico.
