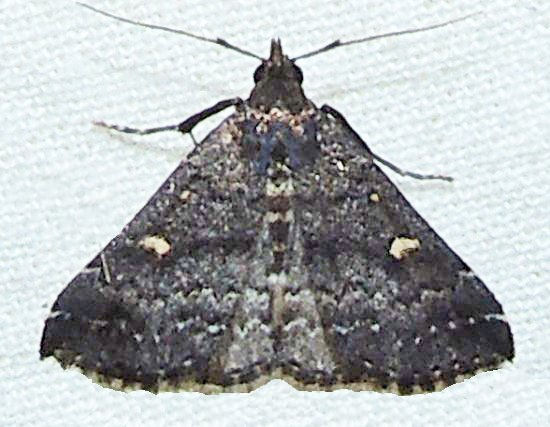

Scientific classification
- Domain: Eukaryota
- Kingdom: Animalia
- Phylum: Arthropoda
- Class: Insecta
- Order: Lepidoptera
- Superfamily: Noctuoidea
- Family: Erebidae
- Subfamily: Herminiinae
- Genus: Hypenula; Grote, 1876

= Hypenula =

Genus of moths

Hypenula is a genus of litter moths of the family Erebidae. The genus was erected by Augustus Radcliffe Grote in 1876.

== Species ==
- Hypenula cacuminalis
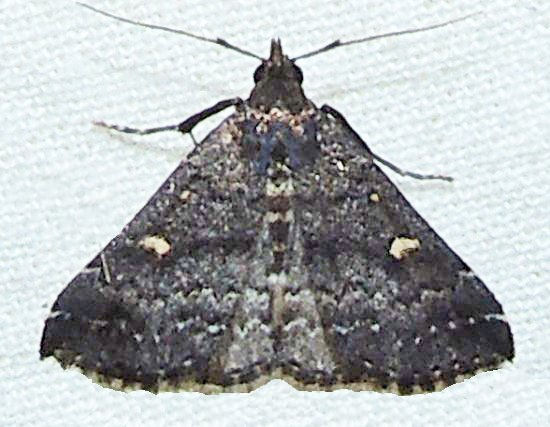
  Hypenula cacuminalis
  (Walker, 1859) – long-horned owlet moth
- Hypenula caminalis Smith, 1905
- Hypenula complectalis (Guenee, 1854)
- Hypenula deleona Schaus, 1916
- Hypenula miriam Schaus, 1916
