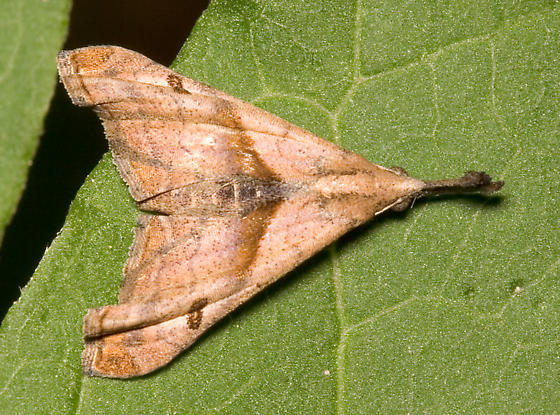
- Palthis angulalis

Scientific classification
- Kingdom: Animalia
- Phylum: Arthropoda
- Clade: Pancrustacea
- Class: Insecta
- Order: Lepidoptera
- Superfamily: Noctuoidea
- Family: Erebidae
- Subfamily: Herminiinae
- Genus: Palthis; Hübner, 1825

= Palthis =

Genus of moths

Palthis is a genus of litter moths of the family Erebidae. The genus was erected by Jacob Hübner in 1825.

== Species ==
- Palthis aeacalis Schaus, 1913
- Palthis agroteralis (Guenée, 1854)
- Palthis angulalis (Hübner, 1796) – dark-spotted palthis moth
- Palthis angustipennis Schaus, 1916
- Palthis argenteicincta Dognin, 1914
- Palthis asopialis (Guenée, 1854) – faint-spotted palthis moth
- Palthis auca Möschler, 1880
- Palthis bizialis (Walker, 1859)
- Palthis calcabilis Dognin, 1914
- Palthis calcalis Schaus, 1906
- Palthis eubaealis Schaus, 1913
- Palthis hieronymus Schaus, 1913
- Palthis incuriosa Dyar, 1914
- Palthis lineata Schaus, 1913
- Palthis misantlalis Schaus, 1916
- Palthis mophisalis (Walker, 1859)
- Palthis obliqualis Dognin, 1914
- Palthis oconequensis Dognin, 1914
- Palthis orasiusalis Walker, 1859
- Palthis phocionalis (Walker, [1859])
- Palthis serapealis Schaus, 1916
- Palthis spectalis (Guenée, 1854)
- Palthis submarginata Schaus, 1913
