= Carteris oculatalis =

Scientific classification
- Domain: Eukaryota
- Kingdom: Animalia
- Phylum: Arthropoda
- Class: Insecta
- Order: Lepidoptera
- Superfamily: Noctuoidea
- Family: Erebidae
- Genus: Carteris
- Species: C. oculatalis

Binomial name
- Carteris oculatalis (Möschler, 1890)

Synonyms
- Zanclognatha oculatalis Möschler, 1890; Epizeuxis anser Druce, 1891

Species of moth

Carteris oculatalis, the dotted carteris moth, is a species of litter moth in the family Erebidae. It is found in southern Florida, Cuba, Puerto Rico, Mexico, Costa Rica and Panama. The species was described by Heinrich Benno Möschler in 1890.

The MONA or Hodges number for Carteris oculatalis is 8391.
