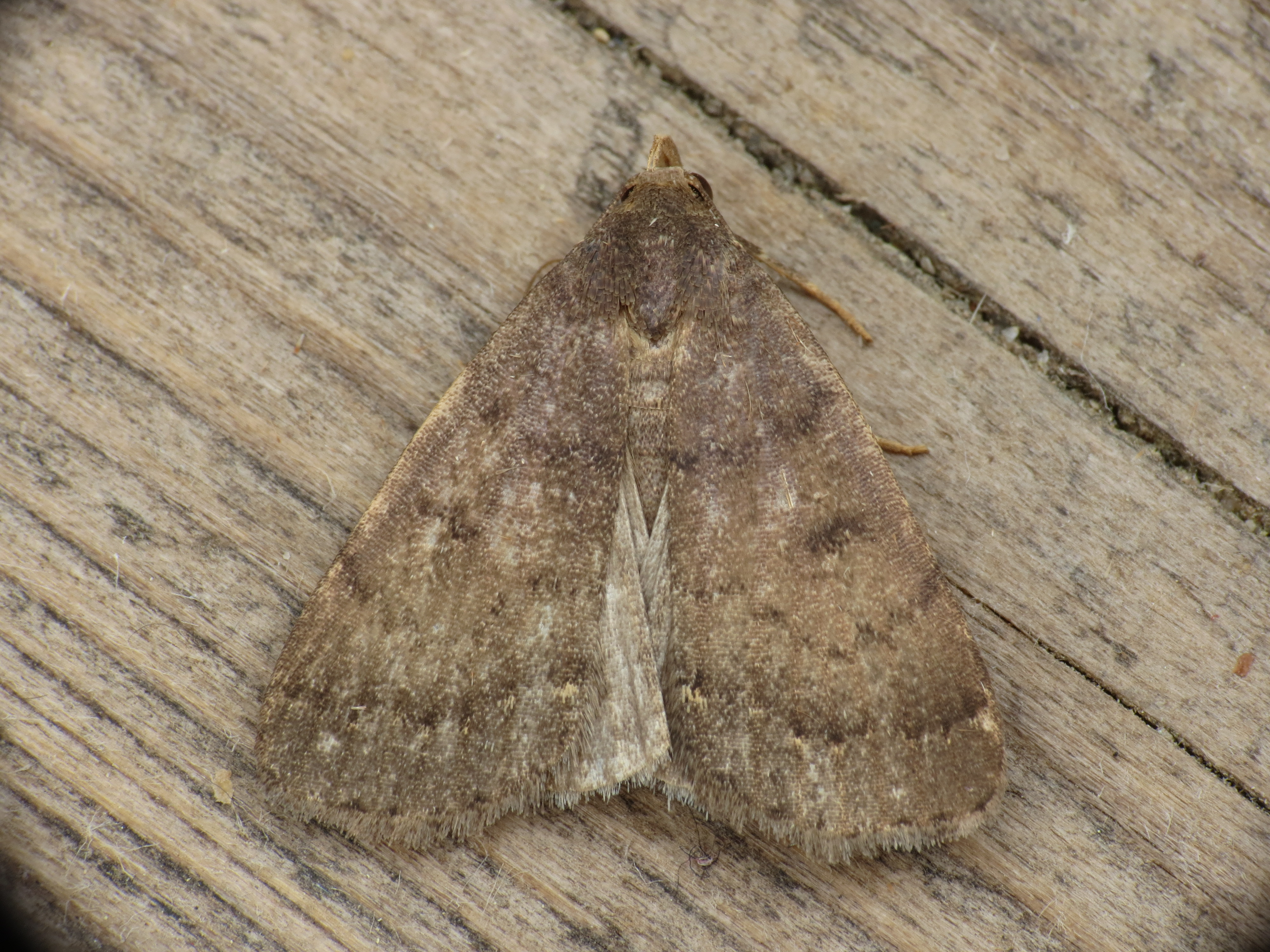

Scientific classification
- Domain: Eukaryota
- Kingdom: Animalia
- Phylum: Arthropoda
- Class: Insecta
- Order: Lepidoptera
- Superfamily: Noctuoidea
- Family: Erebidae
- Genus: Nodaria
- Species: N. nodosalis

Binomial name
- Nodaria nodosalis (Herrich-Schäffer, [1851])

Synonyms
- Bocana aesopulalis Walker, 1859; Herminia aethiopalis Herrich-Schäffer, 1851; Herminia nodosalis Herrich-Schäffer, 1851; Nodaria aesopusalis Nodaria hispanalis Guenée, 1854

= Nodaria nodosalis =

Species of moth

Nodaria nodosalis is a species of moth of the family Erebidae. It is found in tropical Africa, Yemen, Oman, North Africa, Portugal, southern France, Italy, Albania, Bulgaria, Greece, Lebanon and Israel.

In Mediterranean Basin there are two generations per year. In the subtropics and tropics there are multiple generations.

The larvae feed on Ipomoea and Lactuca species.
