= Nodaria cingala =

Scientific classification
- Kingdom: Animalia
- Phylum: Arthropoda
- Clade: Pancrustacea
- Class: Insecta
- Order: Lepidoptera
- Superfamily: Noctuoidea
- Family: Erebidae
- Genus: Nodaria
- Species: N. cingala

Binomial name
- Nodaria cingala Moore, 1885

Synonyms
- Nodaria externalis Guenée, 1854

Species of moth

Nodaria cingala is a moth of the family Erebidae first described by Frederic Moore in 1885. It is found in Sri Lanka, Borneo and Sulawesi. N. externalis is described from African countries such as Kenya, Malawi, Mauritius, Somalia, South Africa and Zambia.

Larval food plants include Dalbergia sissoo, Oryza sativa and grasses.
