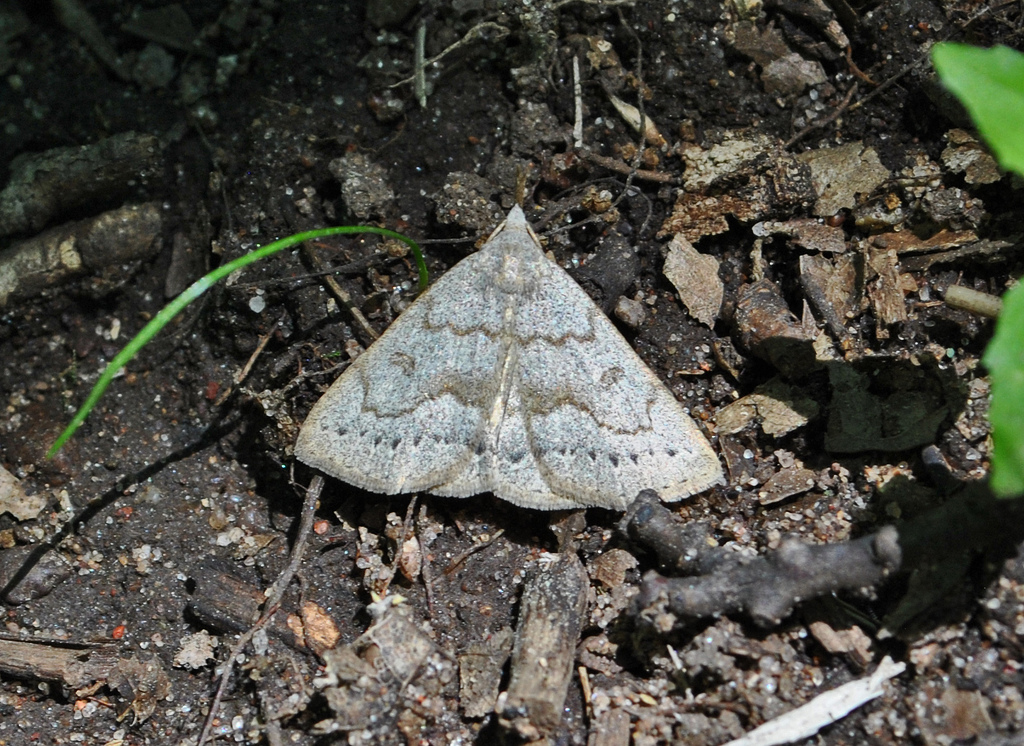

Scientific classification
- Kingdom: Animalia
- Phylum: Arthropoda
- Class: Insecta
- Order: Lepidoptera
- Superfamily: Noctuoidea
- Family: Erebidae
- Genus: Chytolita; Grote, 1873
- Species: C. morbidalis

Binomial name
- Chytolita morbidalis (Guenée, 1854)

Synonyms
- Herminea morbidalis Guenée, 1854; Macrochilo morbidalis; Chytolita petrealis Grote, 1880; Macrochilo petrealis; Chytolita fulicalis Smith, 1907; Zanclognatha punctiformis Smith, 1895

= Chytolita =

Genus of moths

Chytolita is a monotypic litter moth genus of the family Erebidae erected by Augustus Radcliffe Grote in 1873. Its only species, Chytolita morbidalis, the morbid owlet moth or morbid owlet, was first described by Achille Guenée in 1854. It is found in large parts of North America, from coast to coast in the north and south to North Carolina, Texas and Florida in the west. The habitat consists of deciduous woods and edges.

The wingspan is 29–35 mm. The forewings are pale grayish white with diffuse, brownish or orangish lines. The hindwings are even paler with faint grayish veins. Adults are on wing from May to August. There seems to be one generation per year.

The larvae feed on the leaves of various deciduous trees and have been reared on dandelion, grass, hazel and lettuce. There are also records for dead leaves, including dried white oak leaves.

== Taxonomy ==
Chytolita petrealis is now considered a synonym of C. morbidalis because DNA barcode analysis has revealed little barcode variation among specimens of both forms examined across a wide geographic range. The smaller, darker "petrealis" form was known by the common names lesser gray chytolita, stone-winged owlet or lesser luteous snout.
