= Carteris =

Scientific classification
- Domain: Eukaryota
- Kingdom: Animalia
- Phylum: Arthropoda
- Class: Insecta
- Order: Lepidoptera
- Superfamily: Noctuoidea
- Family: Erebidae
- Subfamily: Herminiinae
- Genus: Carteris; Dognin, 1914

Genus of moths

Carteris is a genus of litter moths of the family Erebidae.

== Species ==
- Carteris lineata (Druce, 1898)
- Carteris oculatalis (Möschler, 1890) – dotted carteris moth
