= Lascoria cristata =

Scientific classification
- Kingdom: Animalia
- Phylum: Arthropoda
- Class: Insecta
- Order: Lepidoptera
- Superfamily: Noctuoidea
- Family: Erebidae
- Genus: Lascoria
- Species: L. cristata

Binomial name
- Lascoria cristata Schaus, 1916

Species of moth

Lascoria cristata is a species of litter moth of the family Erebidae. It is found in Central America, including Panama and Costa Rica.
