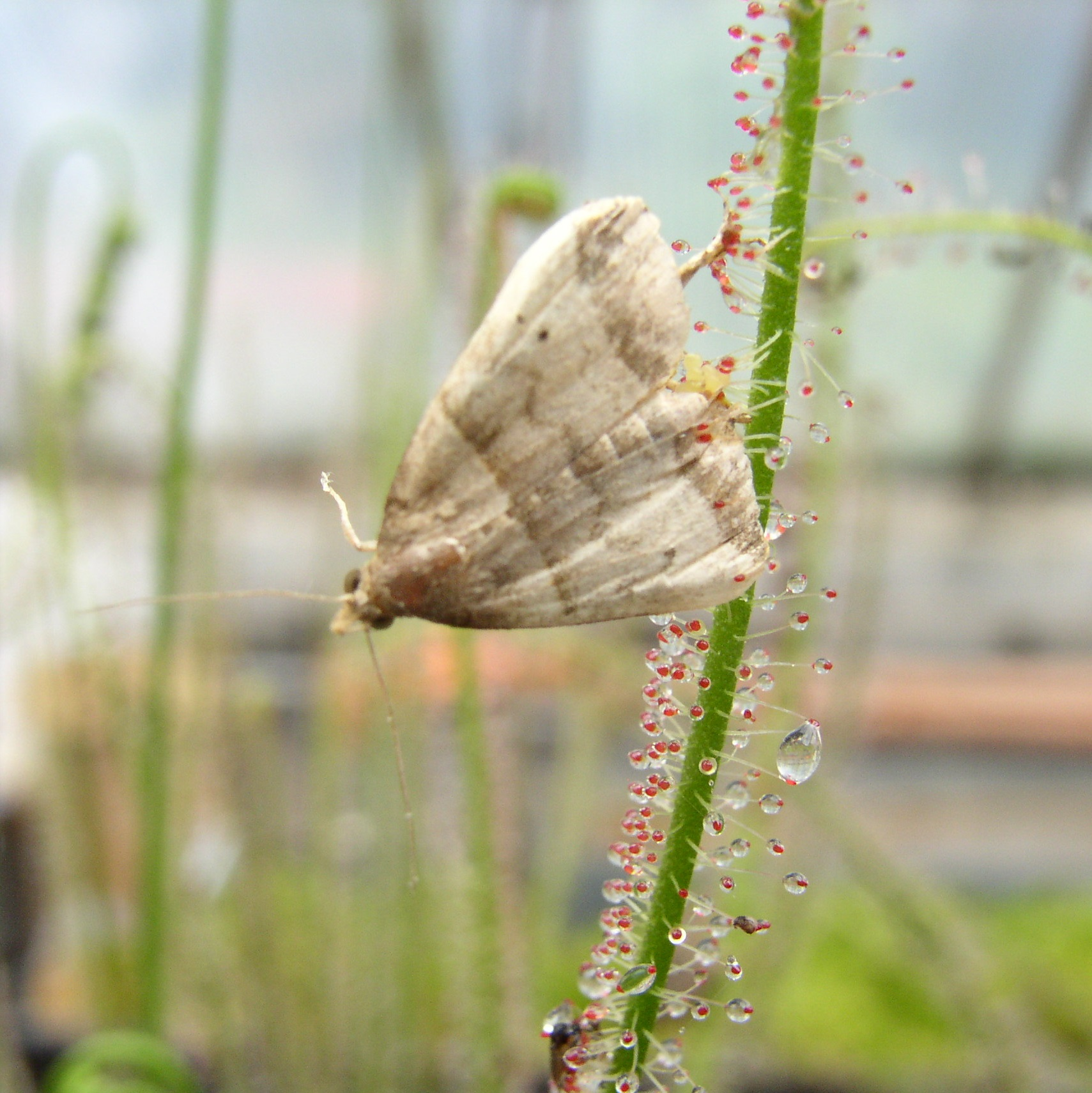
- Phalaenophana pyramusalis caught by sundew, Drosera filiformis

Scientific classification
- Kingdom: Animalia
- Phylum: Arthropoda
- Class: Insecta
- Order: Lepidoptera
- Superfamily: Noctuoidea
- Family: Erebidae
- Subfamily: Herminiinae
- Genus: Phalaenophana; Grote, 1873

Synonyms
- Neoherminia H. Druce, 1891

= Phalaenophana =

Genus of moths

Phalaenophana is a genus of litter moths of the family Erebidae. The species was first described by Augustus Radcliffe Grote in 1873.

== Species ==
- Phalaenophana eudorealis (Guenée, 1854)
- Phalaenophana extremalis (Barnes & McDunnough, 1912)
- Phalaenophana fadusalis (Walker, 1859) Brazil
- Phalaenophana isenenias (Schaus, 1916)
- Phalaenophana lojanalis (Dognin, 1914)
- Phalaenophana modestalis (Schaus, 1912)
- Phalaenophana nigridiscatalis (Dognin, 1914)
- Phalaenophana oppialis (Walker, 1859)
- Phalaenophana pyramusalis (Walker, [1859]) – dark-banded owlet moth
- Phalaenophana santiagonis (Schaus, 1916)
