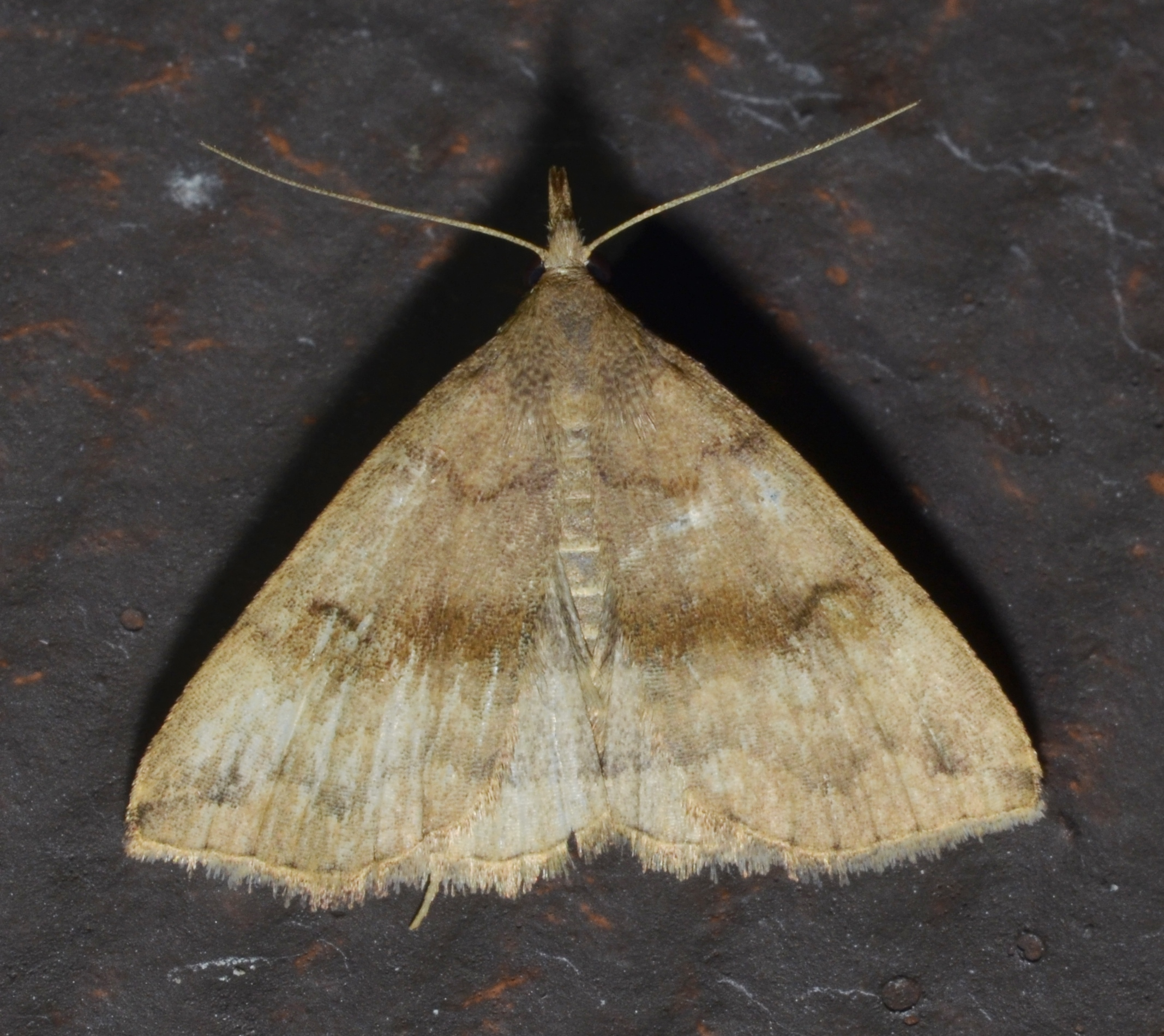
- Phalaenostola eumelusalis

Scientific classification
- Kingdom: Animalia
- Phylum: Arthropoda
- Class: Insecta
- Order: Lepidoptera
- Superfamily: Noctuoidea
- Family: Erebidae
- Subfamily: Herminiinae
- Genus: Phalaenostola; Grote, 1873

Synonyms
- Philometra Grote, 1872 (preoccupied); Epidelta Nye, 1975

= Phalaenostola =

Genus of moths

Phalaenostola is a genus of litter moths of the family Erebidae. The genus was erected by Augustus Radcliffe Grote in 1873.

== Species ==
- Phalaenostola eumelusalis (Walker, 1859) – punctuated owlet moth
- Phalaenostola hanhami J. B. Smith, 1899 – Hanham's owlet moth
- Phalaenostola larentioides Grote, 1873 – black-banded owlet moth
- Phalaenostola metonalis Walker, 1859 – tufted snout moth
