= Kyneria =

Scientific classification
- Domain: Eukaryota
- Kingdom: Animalia
- Phylum: Arthropoda
- Class: Insecta
- Order: Lepidoptera
- Superfamily: Noctuoidea
- Family: Erebidae
- Genus: Kyneria
- Species: K. utuadae

Binomial name
- Kyneria utuadae Schaus, 1940

Genus of moths

Kyneria is a monotypic moth genus of the family Erebidae. Its only species, Kyneria utuadae, is known from Puerto Rico. Both the genus and the species were first described by William Schaus in 1940.
