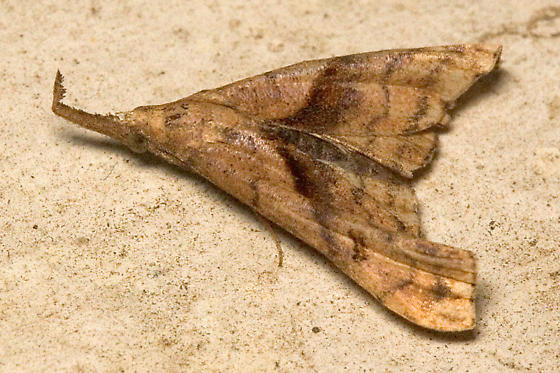

Scientific classification
- Kingdom: Animalia
- Phylum: Arthropoda
- Clade: Pancrustacea
- Class: Insecta
- Order: Lepidoptera
- Superfamily: Noctuoidea
- Family: Erebidae
- Genus: Palthis
- Species: P. angulalis

Binomial name
- Palthis angulalis (Hübner, 1796)

Synonyms
- Palthis aracinthusalis (Walker, 1859)

= Palthis angulalis =

Species of moth

Palthis angulalis, the dark-spotted palthis, is a moth of the family Erebidae. The species was first described by Jacob Hübner in 1796. It is found from Newfoundland west to coastal British Columbia, south to Florida and Texas.

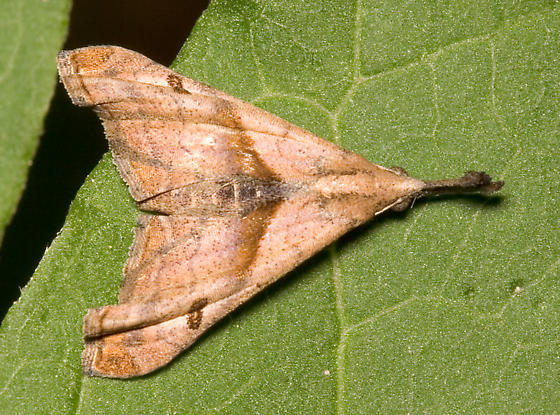

The wingspan is 20–26 mm. Adults are on wing from May to August in Alberta. There are two generations in much of the eastern part of its range, three or more generations from Missouri southward.

The larvae feed on various plants, including forbs, woody shrubs and trees (alder, aster, basswood, birch, chestnut, fir, sweetgale, goldenrod, ninebark, rhododendron, scrub oak and spruce).
