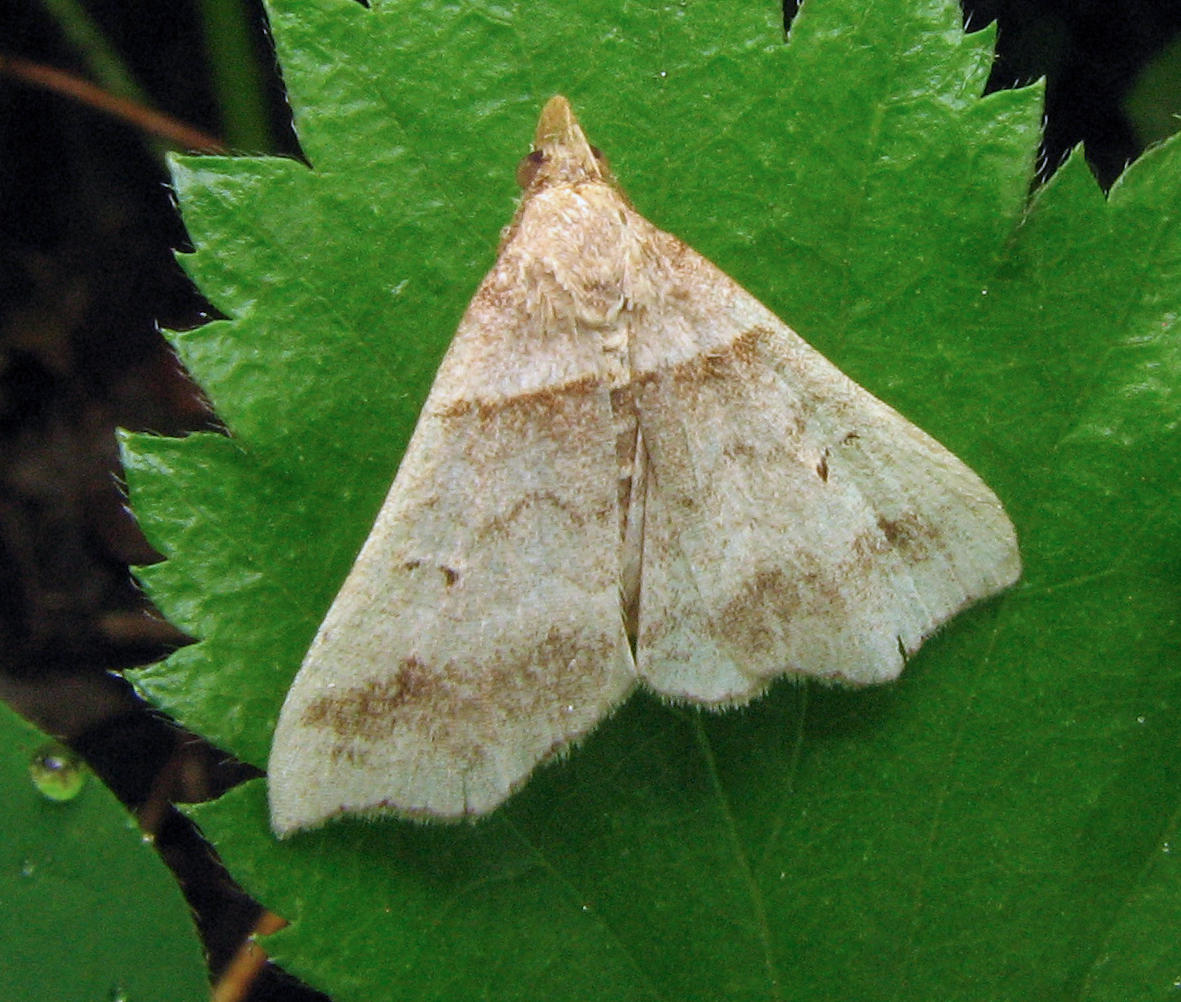

Scientific classification
- Kingdom: Animalia
- Phylum: Arthropoda
- Clade: Pancrustacea
- Class: Insecta
- Order: Lepidoptera
- Superfamily: Noctuoidea
- Family: Erebidae
- Genus: Phalaenophana
- Species: P. pyramusalis

Binomial name
- Phalaenophana pyramusalis (Walker, 1859)

Synonyms
- Phalaenophana gyasalis (Walker, 1859); Phalaenophana rurigena Grote, 1873

= Phalaenophana pyramusalis =

Species of moth

Phalaenophana pyramusalis, the dark-banded owlet, is a moth of the family Erebidae. The species was first described by Francis Walker in 1859. It is found in North America from Saskatchewan to Nova Scotia, south to North Carolina and Texas.

The wingspan is 21–25 mm. Adults are on wing from June to July in Alberta. There are two or more generations per year.

The larvae feed on dead leaves. They prefer leaves that are moist, blackened and in decay.
