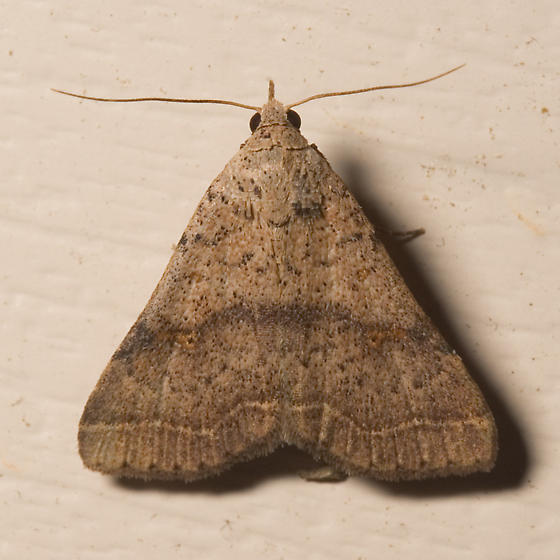

Scientific classification
- Kingdom: Animalia
- Phylum: Arthropoda
- Clade: Pancrustacea
- Class: Insecta
- Order: Lepidoptera
- Superfamily: Noctuoidea
- Family: Erebidae
- Genus: Bleptina
- Species: B. caradrinalis

Binomial name
- Bleptina caradrinalis Guenée, 1852

Synonyms
- Bleptina cloniasalis

= Bleptina caradrinalis =

Species of moth

Bleptina caradrinalis, the bent-winged owlet or variable snout moth, is a species of moth of the family Erebidae. It was described by Achille Guenée in 1852. It is found in North America, from Nova Scotia west to British Columbia, south to Arizona. Furthermore, it is found from southern North America south to Brazil and on the Antilles.

The wingspan is 22–32 millimetres (0.87–1.26 in). Adults are on wing from June to August depending on the location.

The larvae feed on the leaves of barberry, clover and hickory.
