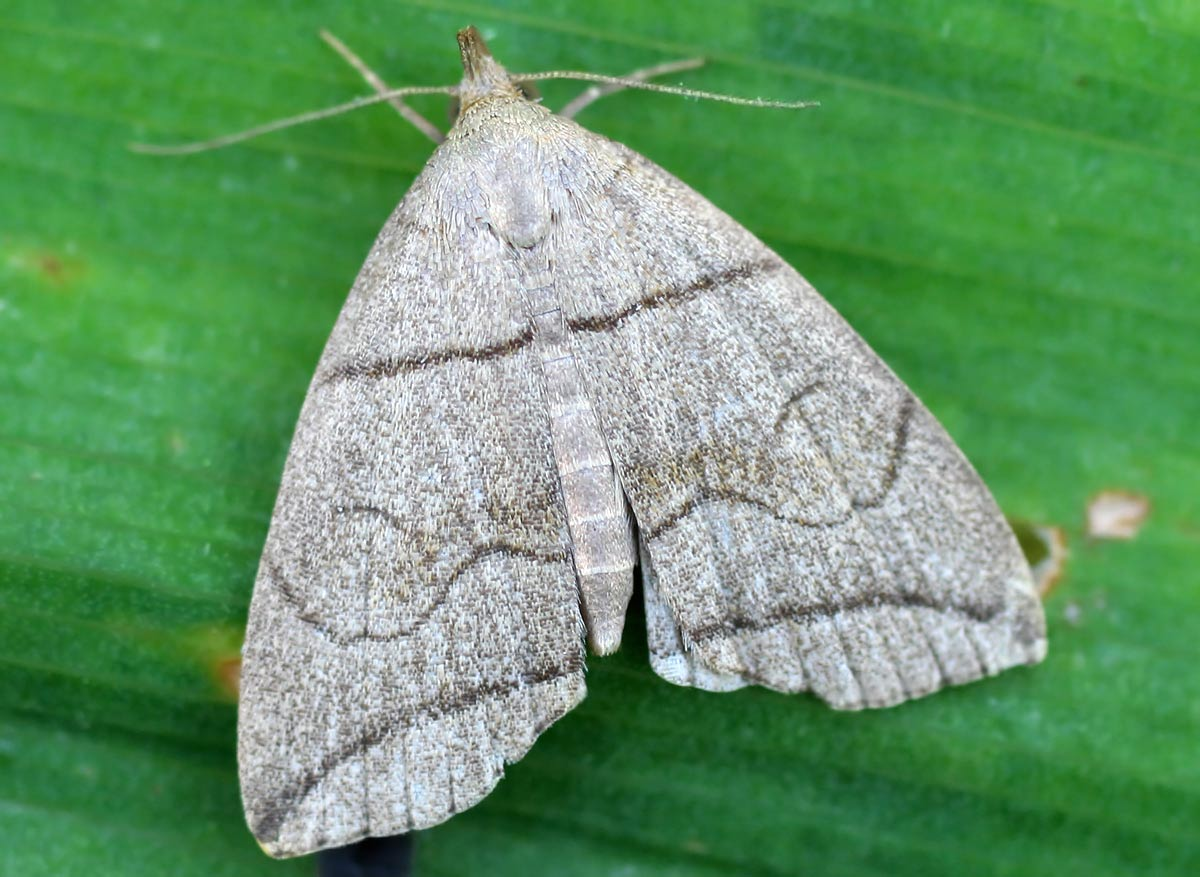
- Herminia grisealis

Scientific classification
- Kingdom: Animalia
- Phylum: Arthropoda
- Clade: Pancrustacea
- Class: Insecta
- Order: Lepidoptera
- Superfamily: Noctuoidea
- Family: Erebidae
- Subfamily: Herminiinae; Leach, 1815

Synonyms
- Herminiidae

= Herminiinae =

Subfamily of moths

The Herminiinae are a subfamily of moths in the family Erebidae. The members of the subfamily are called litter moths because the caterpillars of most members feed on dead leaves of plants, though others feed on living leaves, and/or the mushrooms of fungi as in the case of genus Idia.

== Taxonomy ==
The subfamily was previous treated as a separate family, Herminiidae, or as a subfamily of the family Noctuidae. Phylogenetic analysis has determined that the Herminiinae are most closely related to the subfamily Aganainae of the Erebidae.

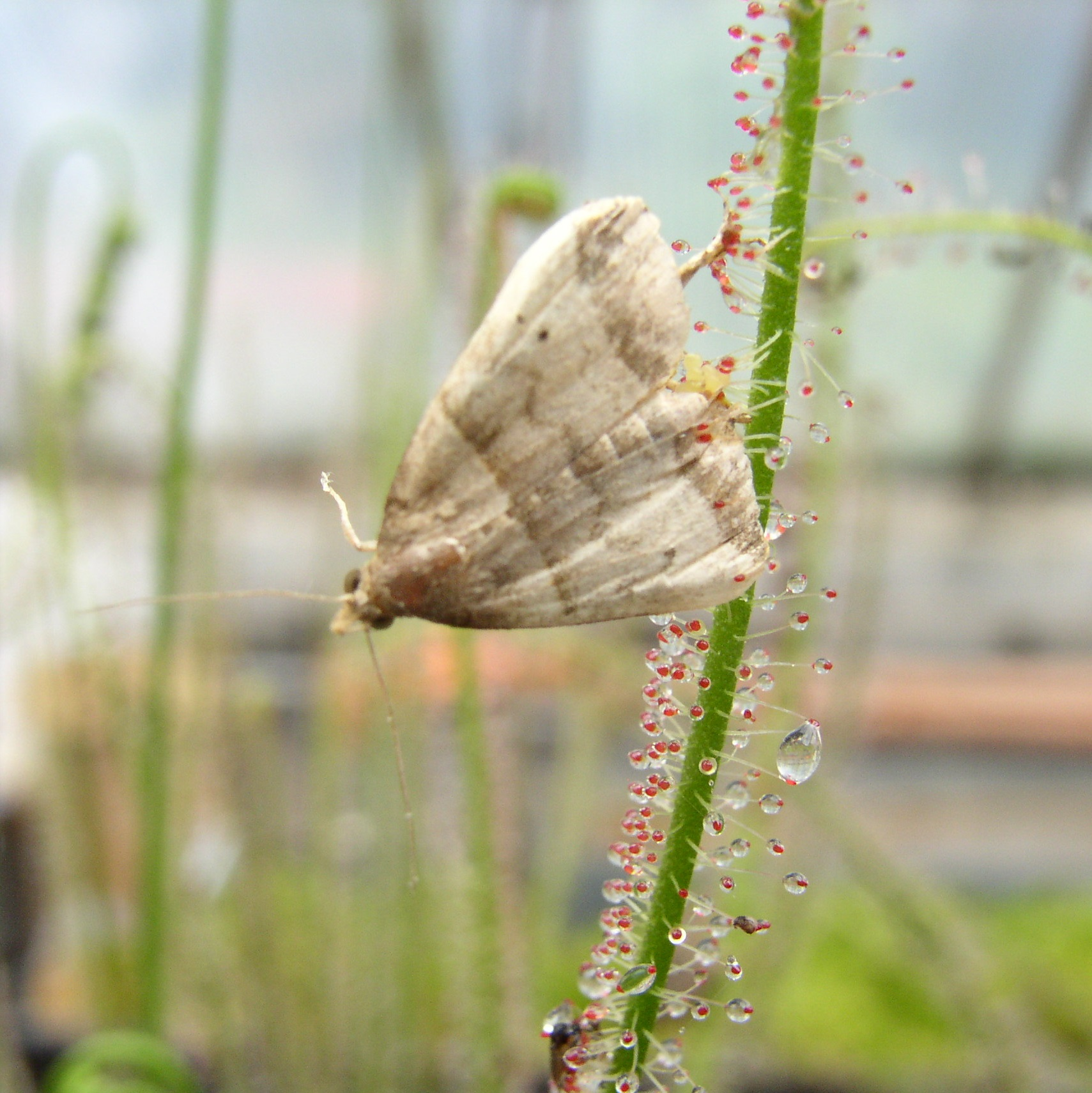
Phalaenophana caught by Drosera filiformis.

== Genera ==
- Aristaria
- Bleptina
- Carteris
- Chytolita
- Drepanopalpia
- Herminia
- Hydrillodes
- Hypenula
- Idia
- Kyneria
- Lascoria
- Lophophora
- Macristis
- Macrochilo
- Maronia
- Nodaria
- Orectis
- Palthis
- Paracolax
- Phalaenophana
- Phalaenostola
- Phlyctaina
- Physula
- Polypogon
- Reabotis
- Redectis
- Rejectaria
- Renia
- Simplicia
- Tetanolita
- Zanclognatha

== Example species ==
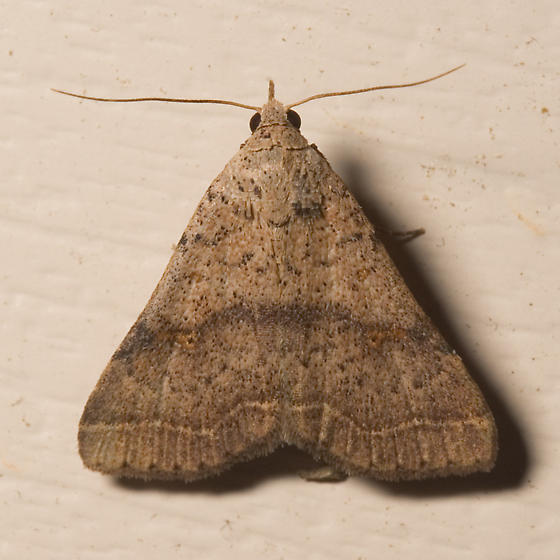
Bleptina caradrinalis

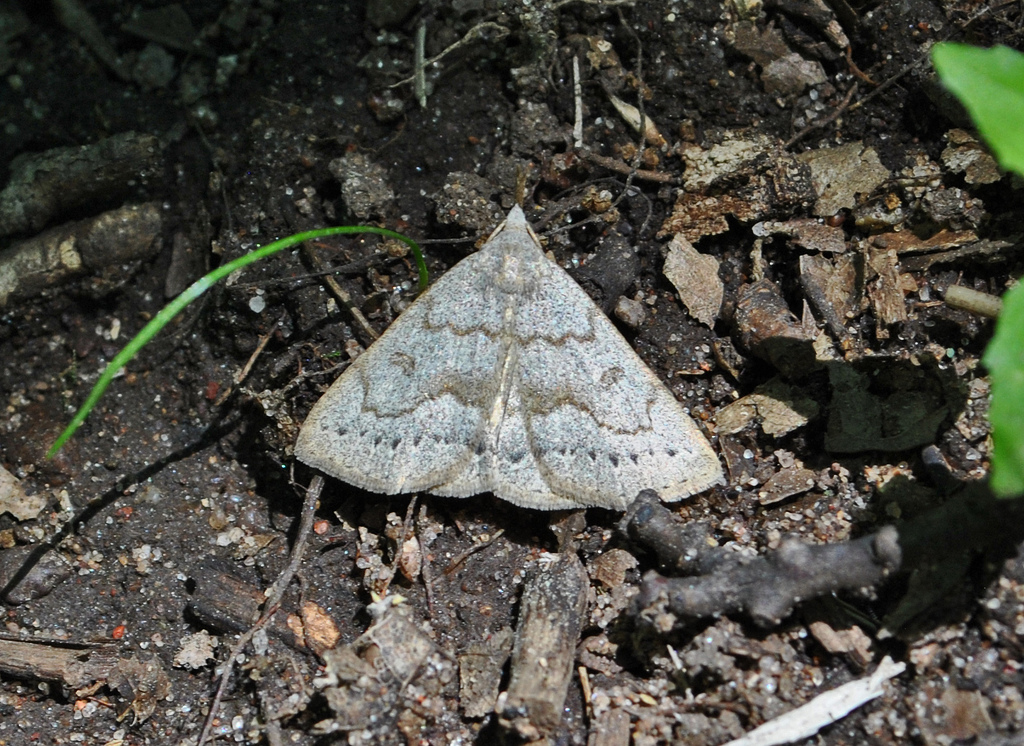
Chytolita morbidalis

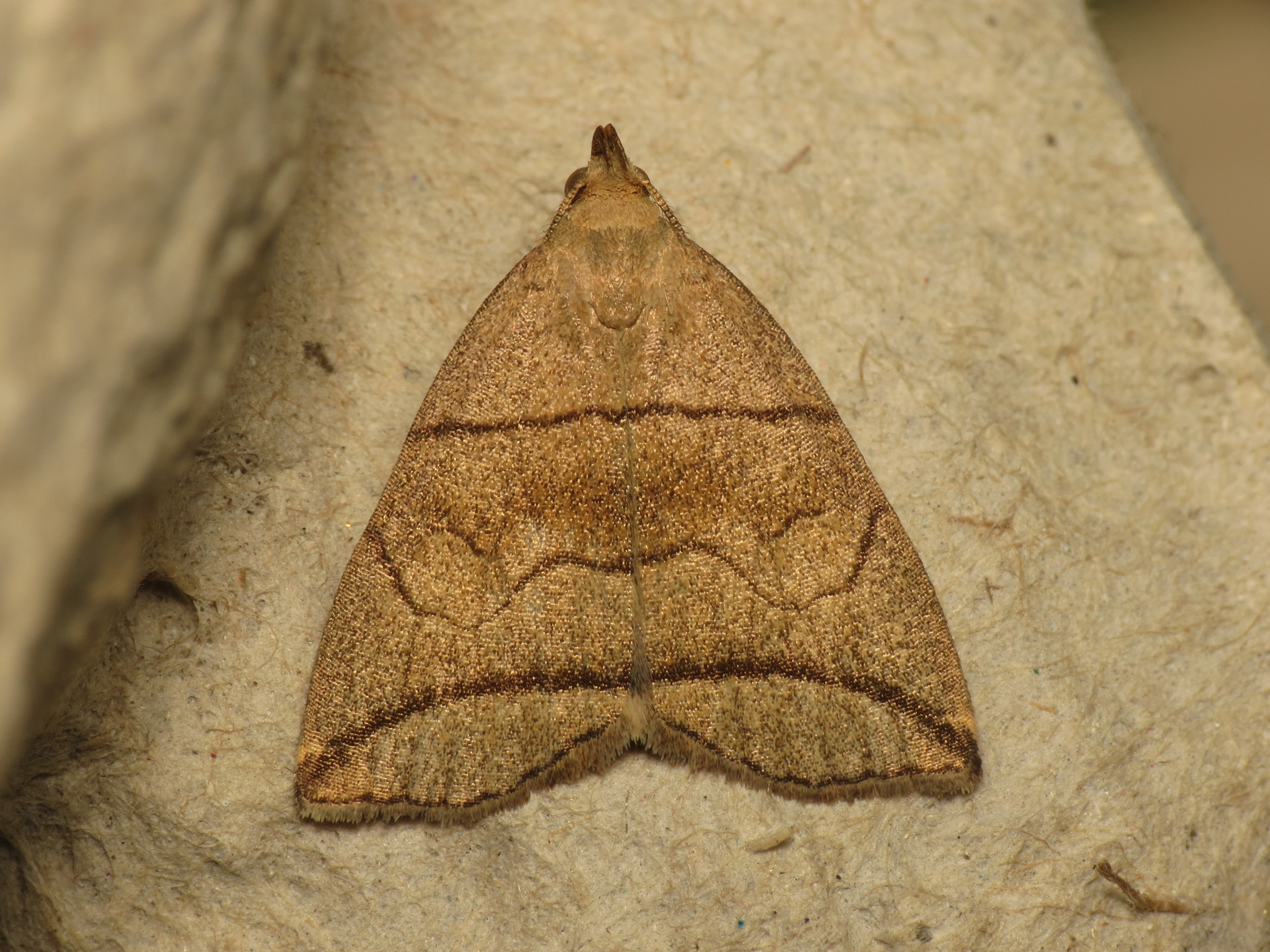
Herminia grisealis

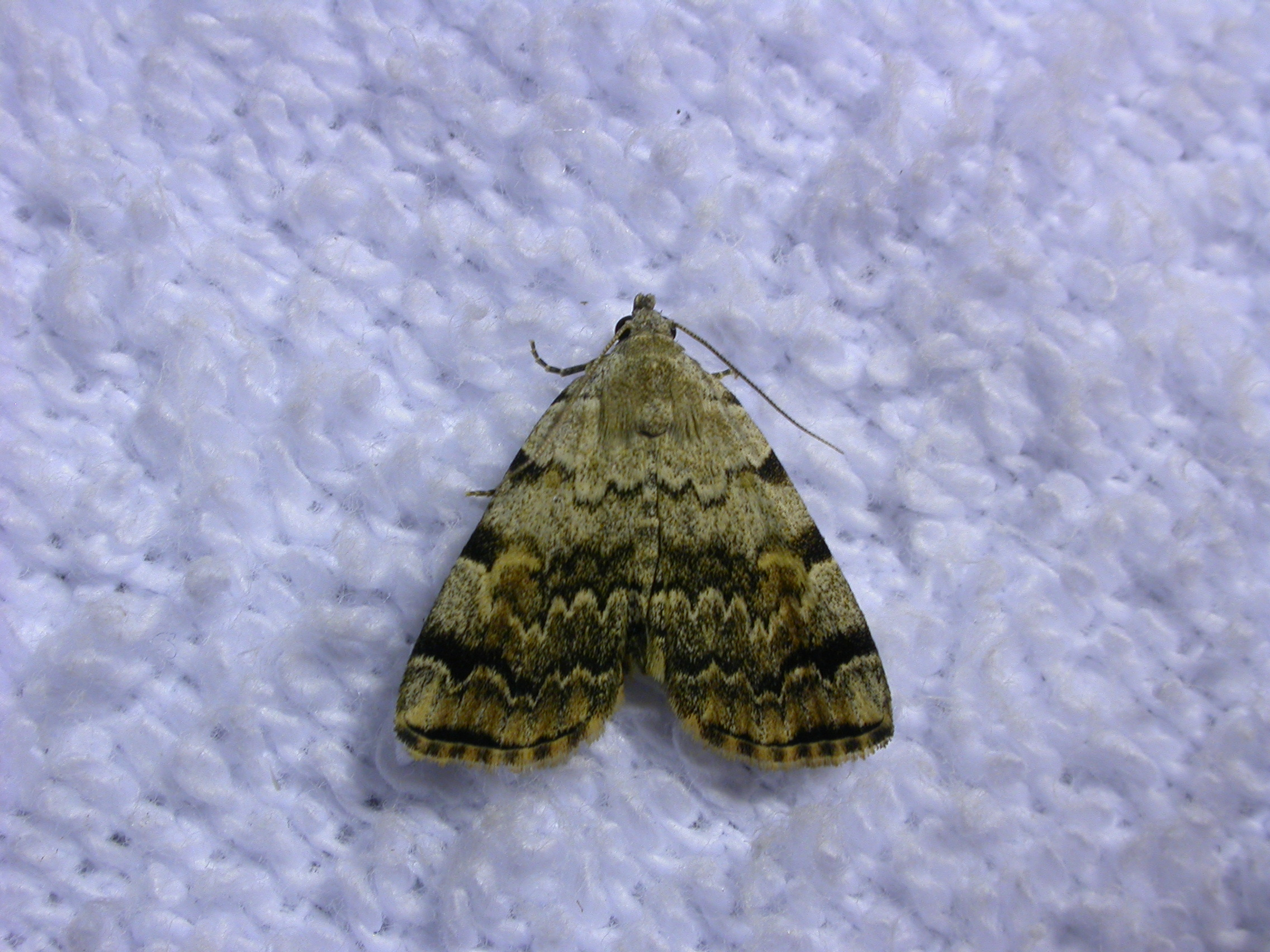
Idia americalis

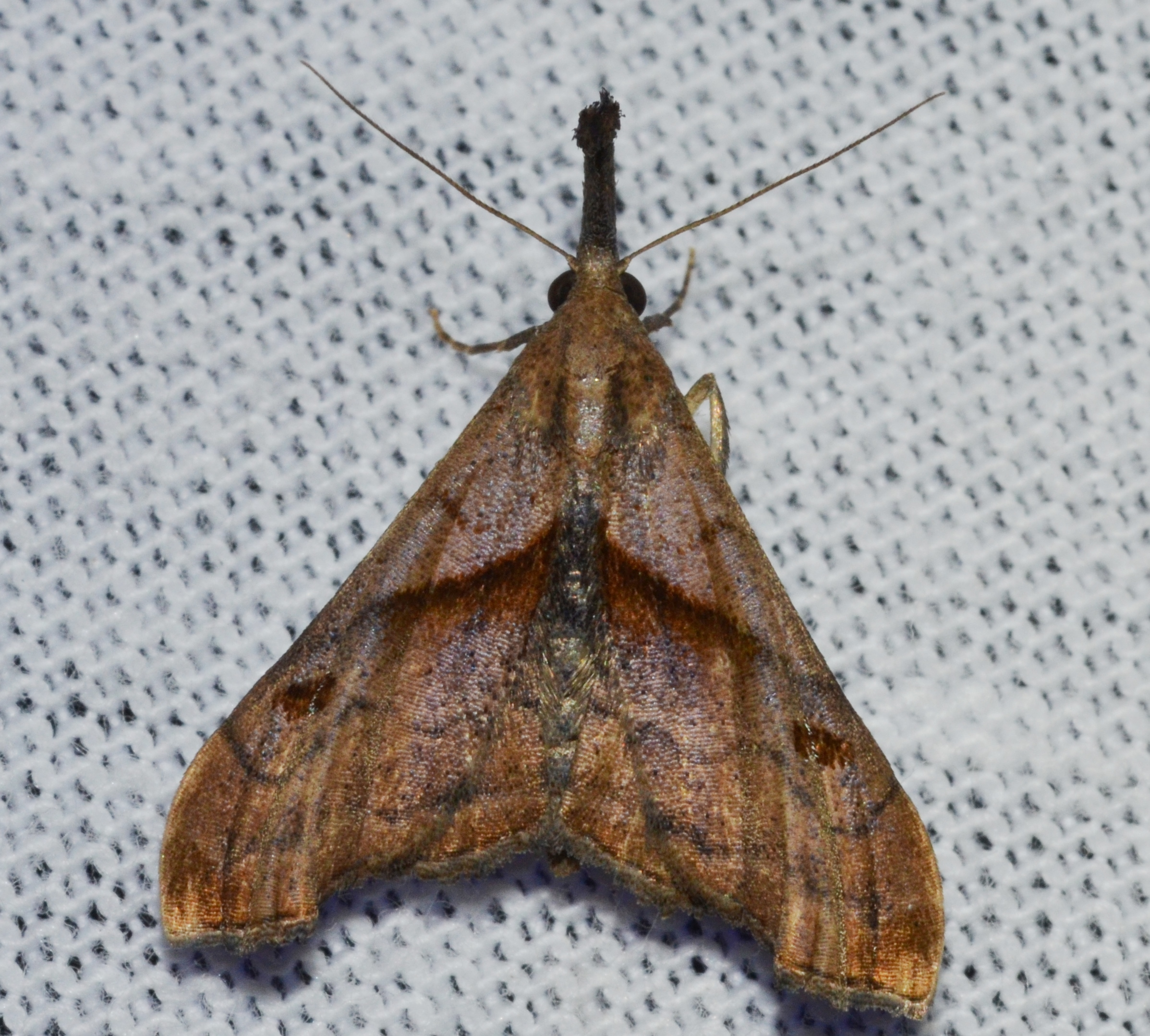
Palthis angulalis

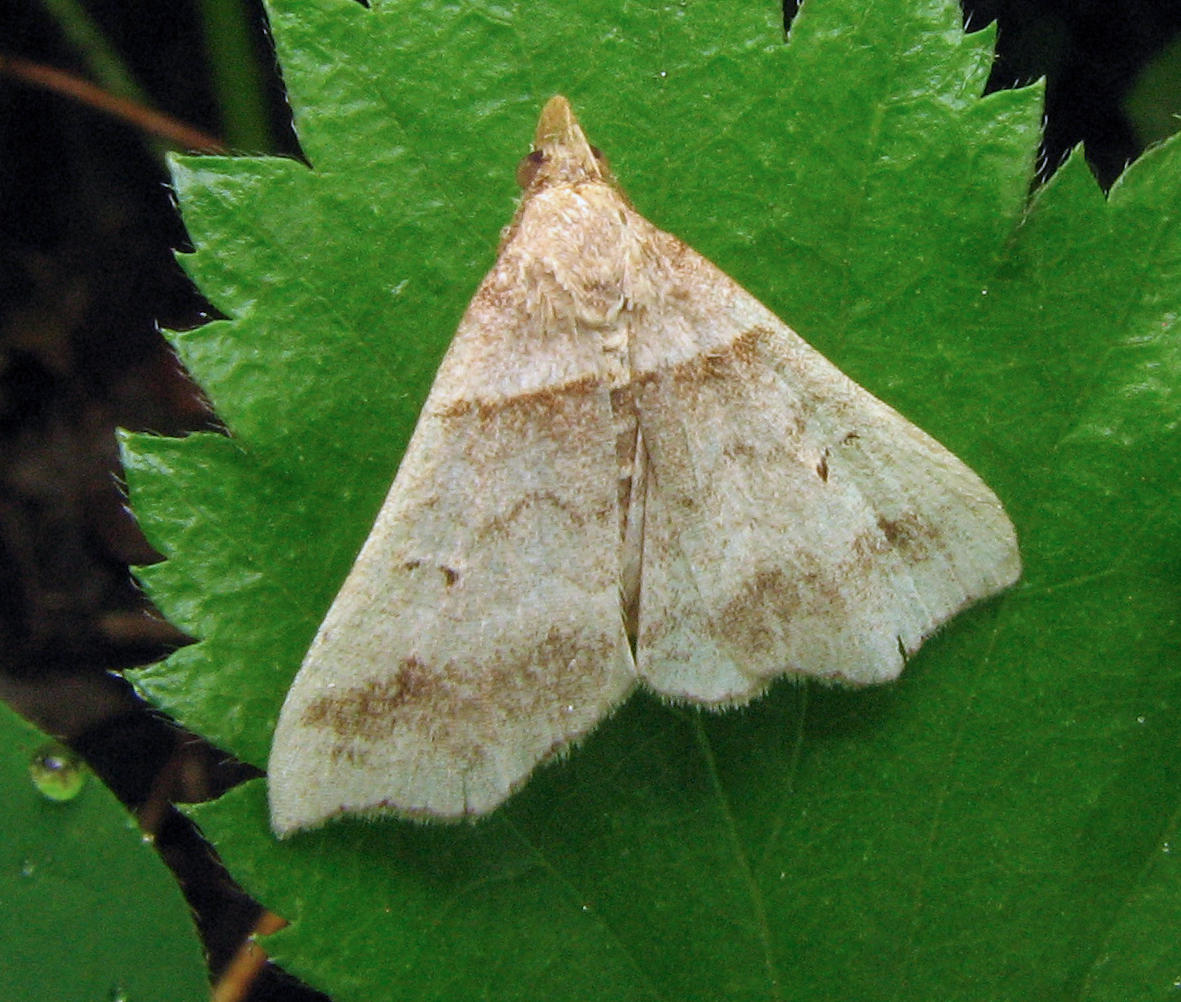
Phalaenophana pyramusalis

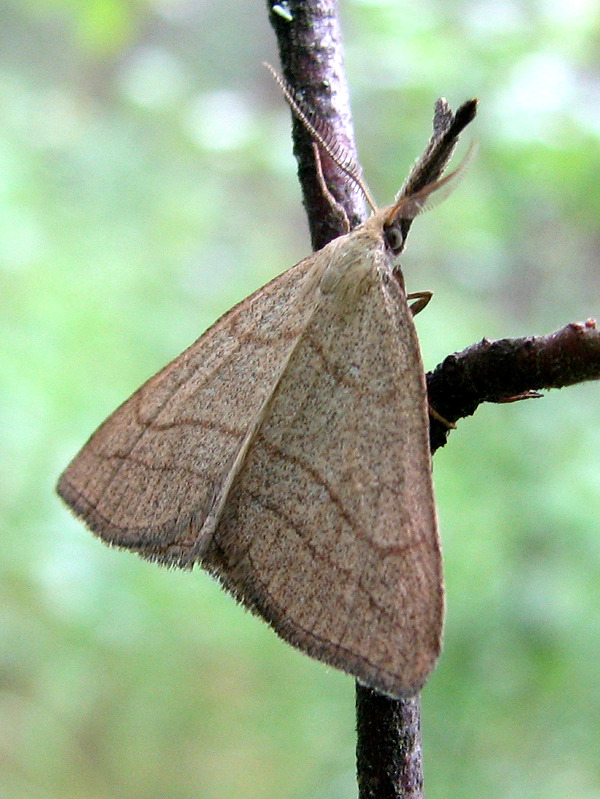
Polypogon tentacularius

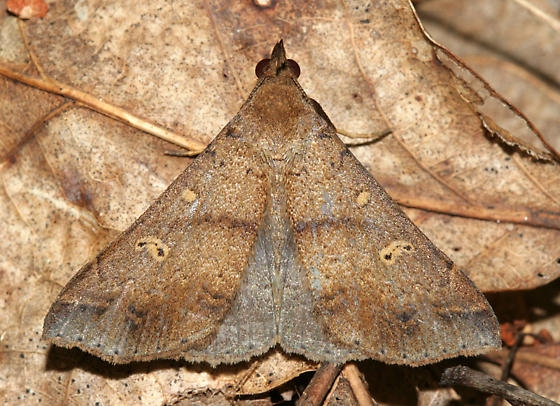
Renia discoloralis

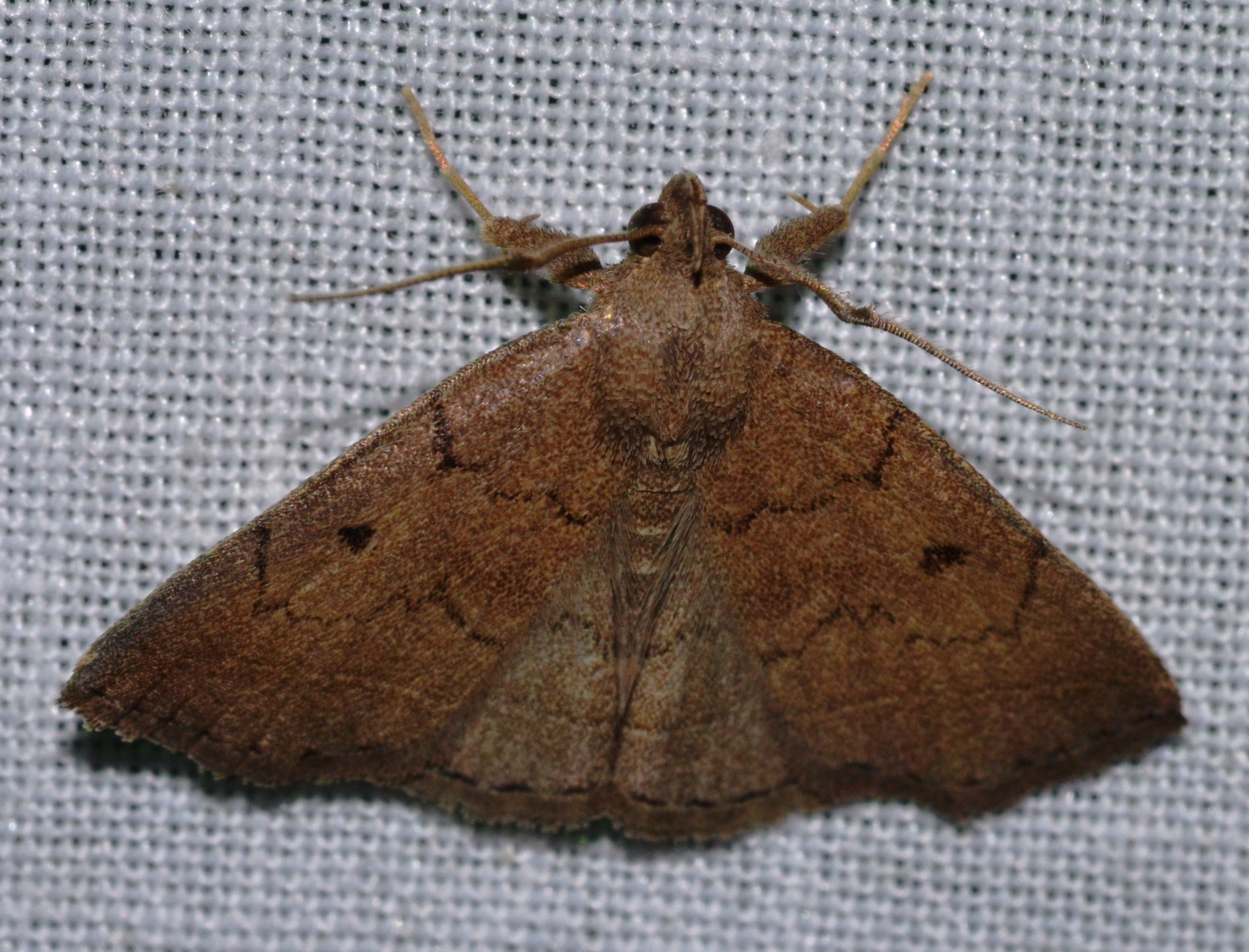
Zanclognatha protumnusalis
