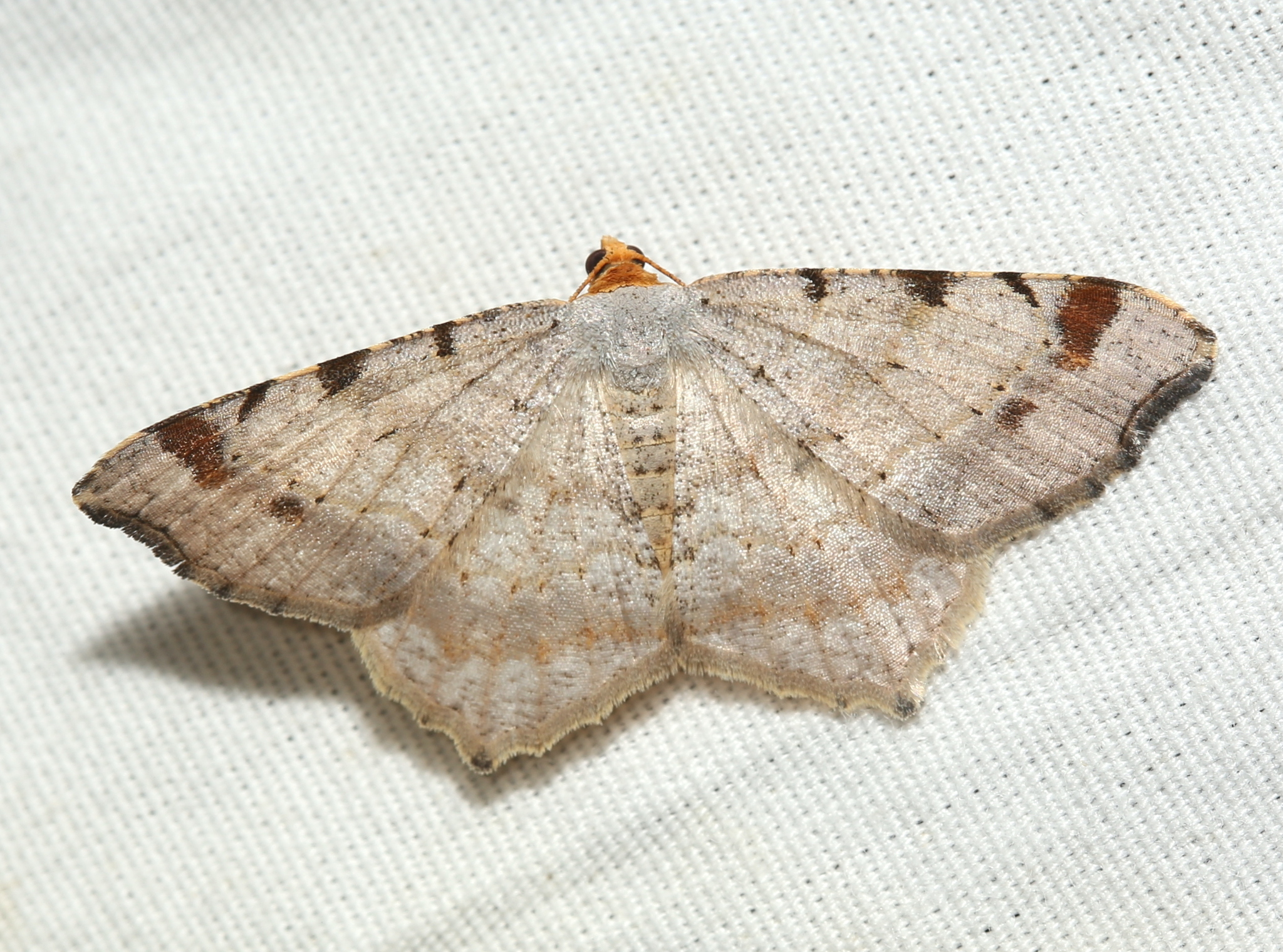
- Macaria bisignata

Scientific classification
- Kingdom: Animalia
- Phylum: Arthropoda
- Class: Insecta
- Order: Lepidoptera
- Family: Geometridae
- Genus: Macaria
- Species: M. bisignata

Binomial name
- Macaria bisignata Walker, 1866

Synonyms
- Semiothisa bisignata; Macaria consimilata Zeller, 1872; Macaria galbineata Zeller, 1872; Diastictis festa Hulst, 1896

= Macaria bisignata =

Species of moth

Macaria bisignata, the redheaded inchworm, is a moth of the family Geometridae. It is found from Newfoundland to Georgia, west to Arizona, north to Ontario.

The wingspan is about 25 mm (0.98 in). The moths are on wing from May to August depending on the location.

The head is reddish brown in color. A particular characteristic of markings are the 3 or 4 dark brown marks where the antemedial, medial, and postmedial lines meet costa (forewing leading edge) and by a larger, subrectangular spot where subterminal band meets costa. Another segment of subterminal band usually persists as a smaller dark spot between M_{3} and CuA_{1}. It is very similar looking to Psamatodes abydata which lacks the dark brown costa marks. The ground color (overall) of the wings ranges from light milky tan to darker gray-brown.

The larva feeds on almost exclusively on pine such as Pinus strobus.
