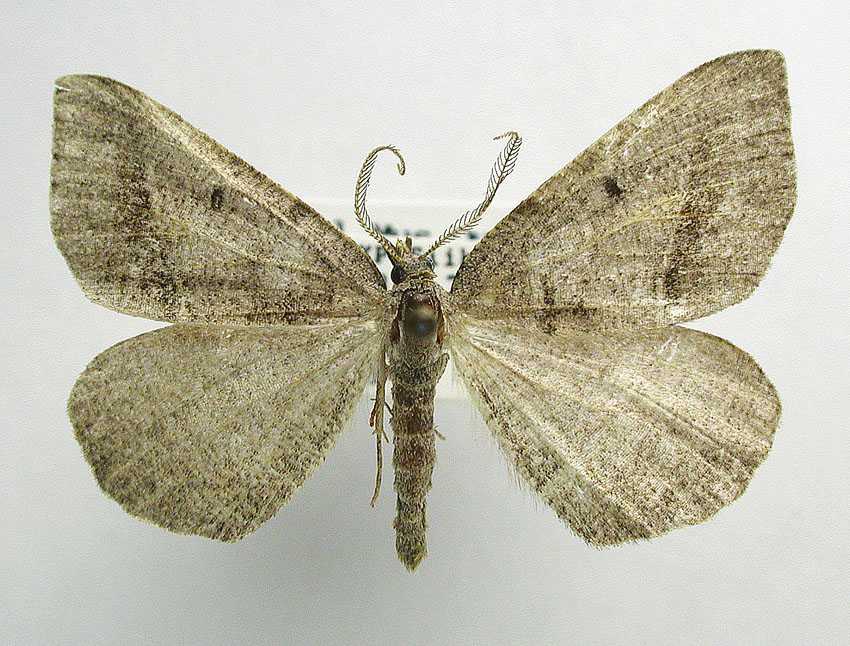

Scientific classification
- Domain: Eukaryota
- Kingdom: Animalia
- Phylum: Arthropoda
- Class: Insecta
- Order: Lepidoptera
- Family: Geometridae
- Genus: Macaria
- Species: M. artesiaria

Binomial name
- Macaria artesiaria (Denis & Schiffermüller, 1775)

Synonyms
- Geometra artesiaria Denis & Schiffermüller, 1775; Speranza artesiaria (Denis & Schiffermüller, 1775); Diastictis artesiaria

= Macaria artesiaria =

Species of moth

Macaria artesiaria is a moth of the family Geometridae. It is found from the North Sea to Mongolia and the Amur River.

The wingspan is 24–28 mm (0.94–1.10 in). There are two generations per year with adults on wing from the end of May to July and from August to September. In the north of the range, there is one generation per year from mid June till August.

The larvae feed on Salix species. Larvae can be found from April to May and again from July to August.
