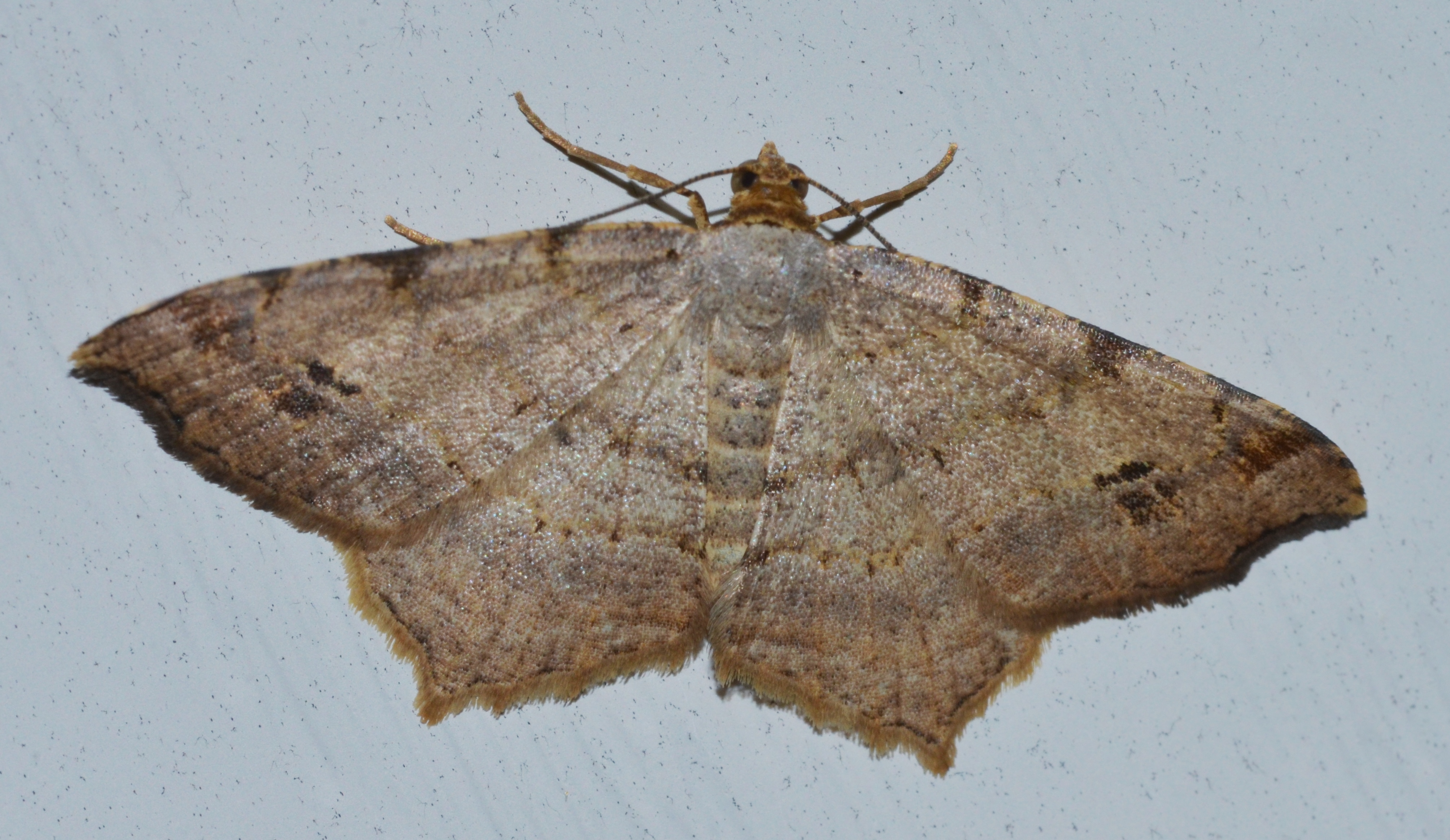

Scientific classification
- Kingdom: Animalia
- Phylum: Arthropoda
- Class: Insecta
- Order: Lepidoptera
- Family: Geometridae
- Genus: Macaria
- Species: M. aequiferaria

Binomial name
- Macaria aequiferaria Walker, 1861

Synonyms
- Macaria postrema Walker, 1861; Macaria subpunctaria Walker, 1861; Macaria morosaria Walker, 1861; Diastictis festa Hulst, 1896

= Macaria aequiferaria =

Species of moth

Macaria aequiferaria, the woody angle moth, is a moth of the family Geometridae. The species was first described by Francis Walker in 1861. It is found in North America, where it has been recorded from Maryland, and Delaware to Florida, west to Texas, as well as in Oklahoma, Mississippi, Kentucky and southern Illinois. It is also found in Mexico.

The wingspan is about 21 mm (0.83 in). Adults have been recorded on wing year round, with most records between March and September.

The larvae feed on Taxodium species.
