= Macaria submarmorata =

Scientific classification
- Kingdom: Animalia
- Phylum: Arthropoda
- Class: Insecta
- Order: Lepidoptera
- Family: Geometridae
- Genus: Macaria
- Species: M. submarmorata

Binomial name
- Macaria submarmorata Walker, 1861

Species of moth

Macaria submarmorata is a species of geometrid moth in the family Geometridae. It is found in North America.

The MONA or Hodges number for Macaria submarmorata is 6350.
