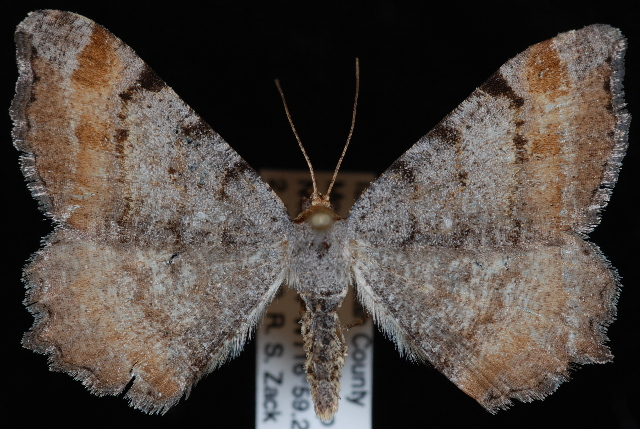

Scientific classification
- Domain: Eukaryota
- Kingdom: Animalia
- Phylum: Arthropoda
- Class: Insecta
- Order: Lepidoptera
- Family: Geometridae
- Genus: Macaria
- Species: M. adonis

Binomial name
- Macaria adonis Barnes & McDunnough, 1918

Synonyms
- Semiothisa adonis

= Macaria adonis =

Species of moth

Macaria adonis is a species of moth in the family Geometridae first described by William Barnes and James Halliday McDunnough in 1918. It is found in North America.

The MONA or Hodges number for Macaria adonis is 6338.
