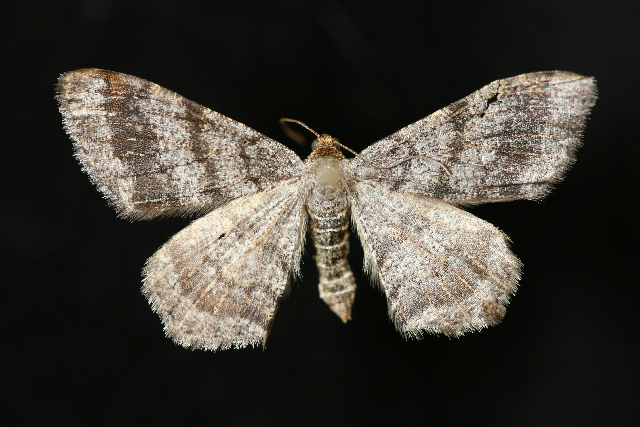

Scientific classification
- Kingdom: Animalia
- Phylum: Arthropoda
- Class: Insecta
- Order: Lepidoptera
- Family: Geometridae
- Genus: Macaria
- Species: M. sexmaculata

Binomial name
- Macaria sexmaculata Packard, 1867

Synonyms
- Semiothisa sexmaculata; Macaria unimodaria Morrison, 1874; Semiothisa labradoriata Möschler, 1883; Itame deleta; Sciagraphia purcellata Taylor, 1908; Macaria minorata var. incolorata Dyar, 1904

= Macaria sexmaculata =

Species of moth

Macaria sexmaculata, known by the common names green larch looper, larch looper or six-spotted angle, is a moth of the family Geometridae. It is found from Alaska to Nunavut and Newfoundland, south in the east to Massachusetts and south in the west to Oregon.

The wingspan is 16–24 mm. Adults are on wing from June to August. There are one to two generations per year.

The larvae of ssp. sexmaculata feed on Larix laricina and Larix decidua. Larvae of ssp. incolorata have been recorded on Larix occidentalis and Pseudotsuga.

== Subspecies ==
- Macaria sexmaculata sexmaculata (Newfoundland, Labrador, Alberta, Massachusetts, Connecticut, New York, Maryland, Michigan, North Dakota)
- Macaria sexmaculata incolorata (Alberta to British Columbia, northern Idaho, western Montana, Washington, Oregon)
