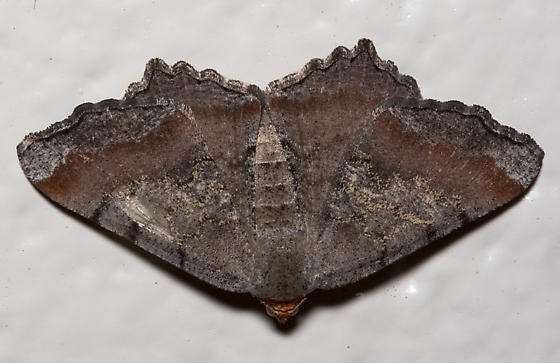

Scientific classification
- Kingdom: Animalia
- Phylum: Arthropoda
- Class: Insecta
- Order: Lepidoptera
- Family: Geometridae
- Genus: Macaria
- Species: M. transitaria

Binomial name
- Macaria transitaria Walker, 1861

Synonyms
- Semiothisa transitaria

= Macaria transitaria =

Species of moth

Macaria transitaria, the blurry chocolate angle, is a moth of the family Geometridae. It is found in North America.

The wingspan is 23–26 mm.

The larva feeds on Pinus species.
