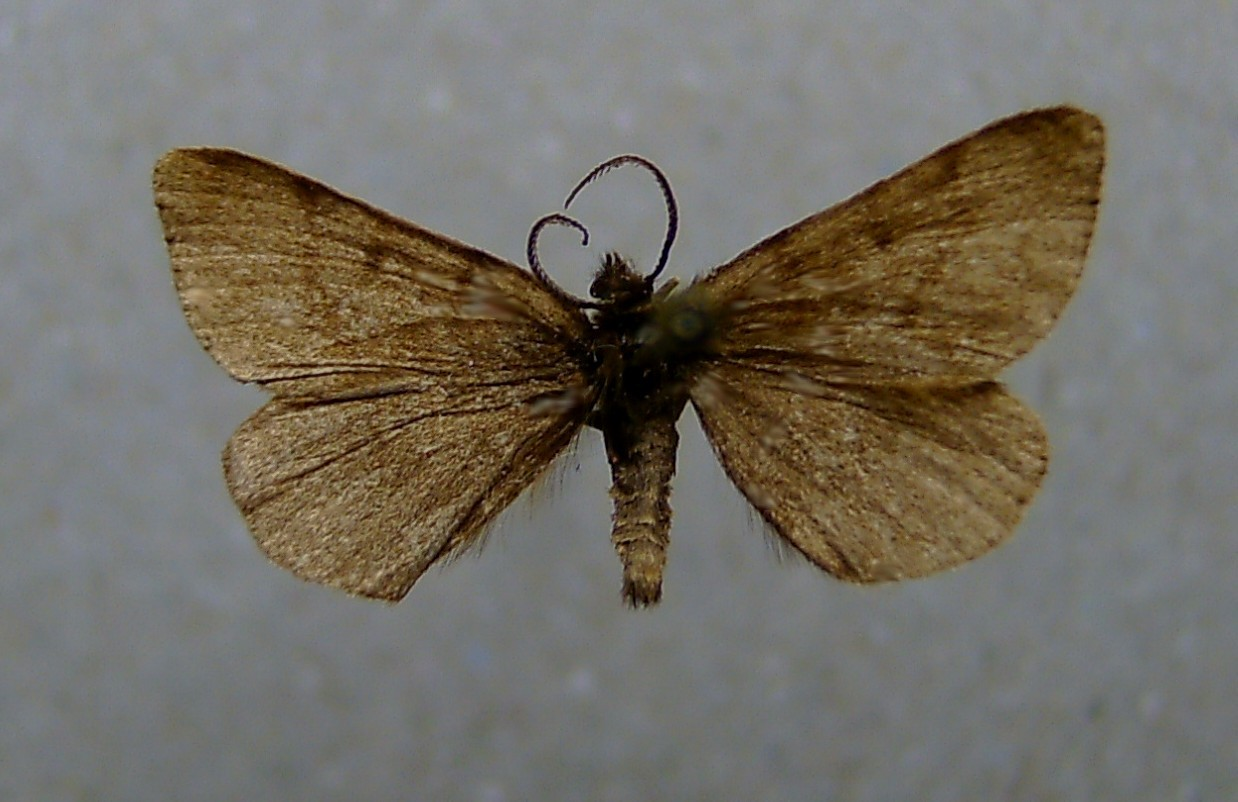

Scientific classification
- Kingdom: Animalia
- Phylum: Arthropoda
- Clade: Pancrustacea
- Class: Insecta
- Order: Lepidoptera
- Family: Geometridae
- Genus: Macaria
- Species: M. fusca

Binomial name
- Macaria fusca (Thunberg, 1792)

Synonyms
- Geometra fusca Thunberg, 1782; Pygmaena fusca

= Macaria fusca =

Species of moth

Macaria fusca is a moth of the family Geometridae first described by Carl Peter Thunberg in 1792. It is found in Alps, Fennoscandia, the Ural, northern Yakutia and Kamchatka. It is found at elevations of up to 3,400 meters.

The wingspan is 14–18 mm for males. Males are on wing from July to August and are day active.

The larvae feed on the leaves of various low-growing plants, including Erophila verna and Viola calcarata.
