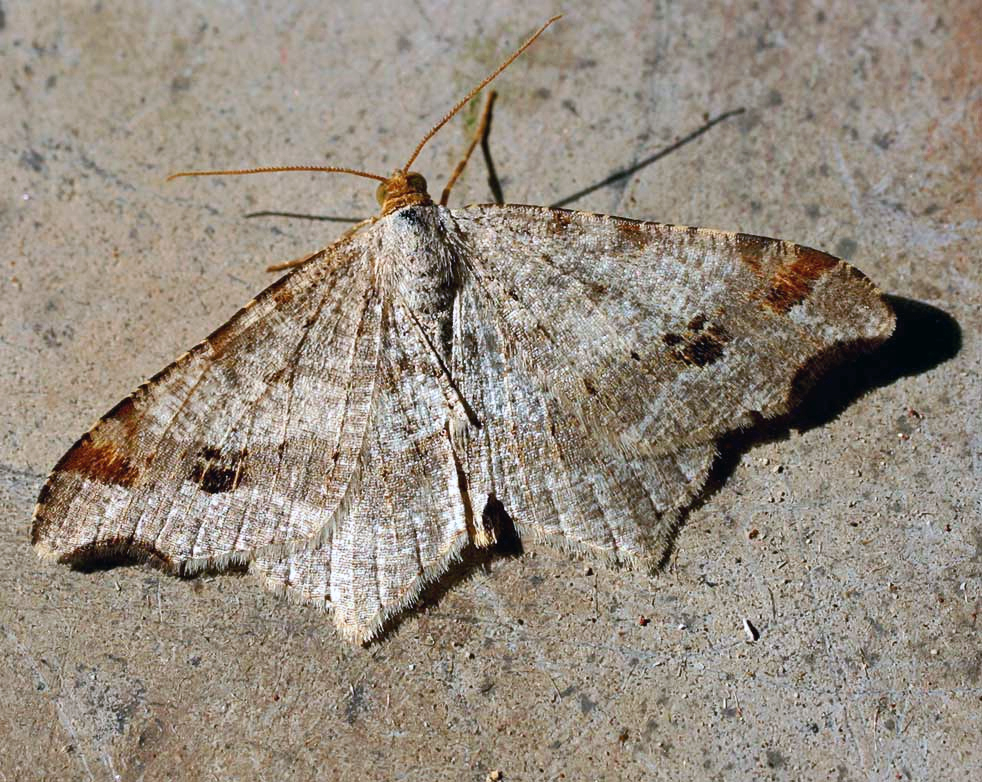
- Macaria notata

Scientific classification
- Kingdom: Animalia
- Phylum: Arthropoda
- Clade: Pancrustacea
- Class: Insecta
- Order: Lepidoptera
- Family: Geometridae
- Tribe: Macariini
- Genus: Macaria; Curtis, 1826

= Macaria (moth) =

Genus of moths

Macaria is a genus of moths in the family Geometridae. It was erected by John Curtis in 1826. The genus Macaria is sometimes placed as a synonym of Semiothisa. Species are cosmopolitan.

== Description ==
Palpi hairy, obliquely porrect (extending forward), and reaching beyond the short frontal tuft. Antennae of male ciliated, rarely serrate (shaped like a saw tooth). Forewings of male with a fovea. Vein 3 from angle of cell. veins 7, 8 and 9 stalked from upper angle, vein 10 absent and vein 11 free. Hindwings with the strongly angled outer margin at vein 4 and slightly at vein 6. Vein 3 from angle of cell.

== Species ==
Species include:

- Macaria abydata Guenée, [1858] - dot-lined angle
- Macaria aemulataria Walker, 1861 - common angle moth
- Macaria adonis Barnes & McDunnough, 1918
- Macaria aequiferaria Walker, 1861
- Macaria anataria Shett, 1913
- Macaria artesiaria (Denis & Schiffermüller, 1775)
- Macaria banksianae Ferguson, 1974
- Macaria bicolorata Fabricius, 1798 - bicolored angle moth
- Macaria bisignata Walker, 1866 - red-headed inchworm moth
- Macaria brunneata Thunberg] 1784
- Macaria carbonaria (Clerck, 1759)
- Macaria distribuaria (Hübner, 1825) - southern coastal plain angle moth
- Macaria fissinotata Walker, 1863 - hemlock angle moth
- Macaria fusca (Thunberg, 1792)
- Macaria garupa Figueredo, Chalup & Fernández Díaz, 2023
- Macaria granitata Guenée, 1857 - granite moth
- Macaria guenearia
- Macaria liturata Clerck, 1759
- Macaria loricaria (Eversmann, 1837)
- Macaria minorata Packard, 1873
- Macaria multilineata Packard, 1873 - many-lined angle moth
- Macaria notata (Linnaeus, 1758) - birch angle moth
- Macaria oweni (Swett, 1907)
- Macaria pinistrobata (Ferguson, 1972) - white pine angle moth
- Macaria ponderosae Ferguson, 2008
- Macaria promiscuata (Ferguson, 1974) - promiscuous angle
- Macaria sanfordi (Rindge, 1958)
- Macaria sexmaculata Packard, 1867
- Macaria signaria Hübner, 1809 - pale-marked angle moth
- Macaria submarmorata Walker, 1861
- Macaria transitaria Walker, 1861 - blurry chocolate angle moth
- Macaria unipunctaria (W. S. Wright, 1916)
- Macaria wauaria (Linnaeus, 1758)
