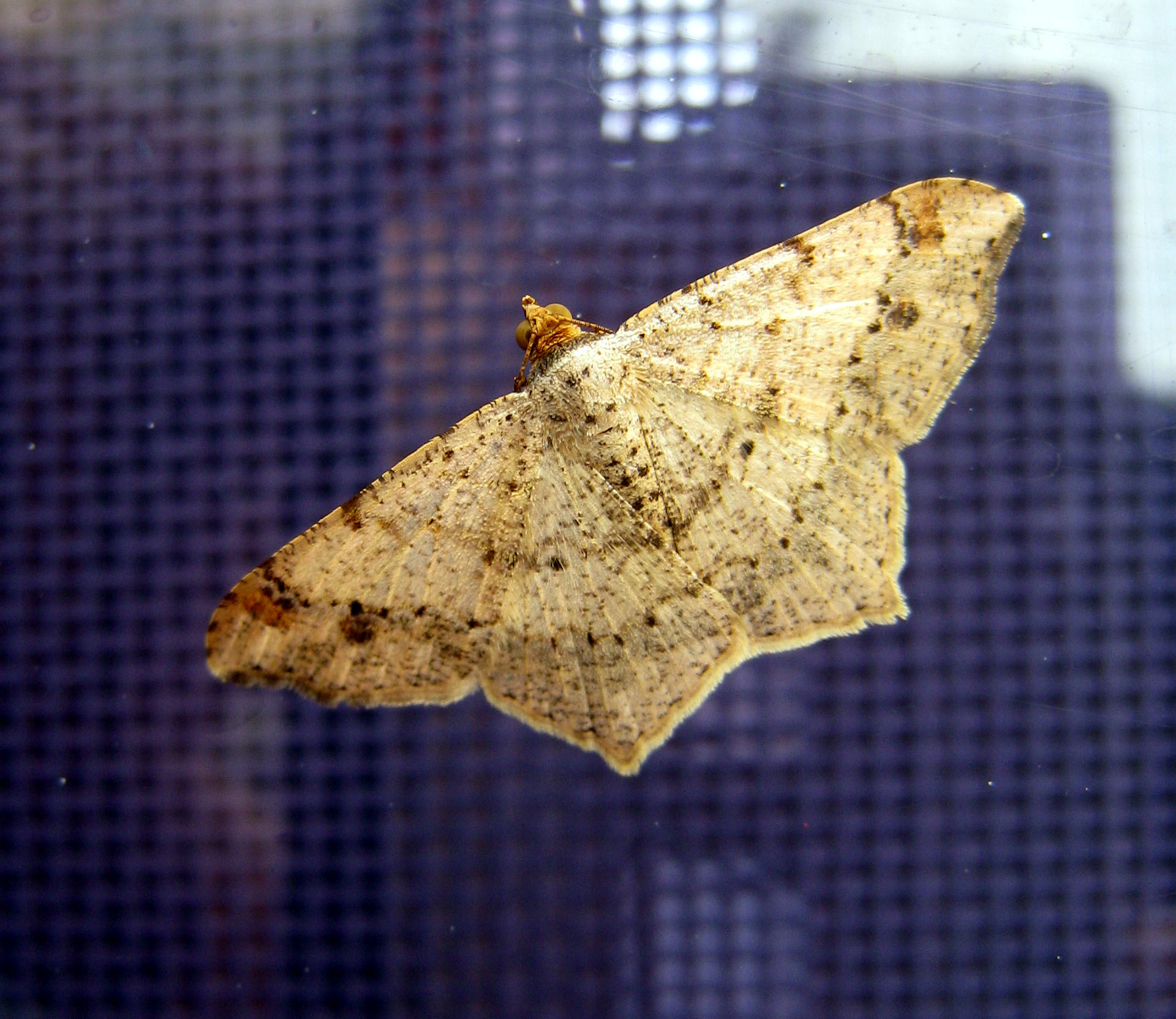
- Psamatodes abydata

Scientific classification
- Kingdom: Animalia
- Phylum: Arthropoda
- Class: Insecta
- Order: Lepidoptera
- Family: Geometridae
- Tribe: Macariini
- Genus: Psamatodes; Guenée, 1857

= Psamatodes =

Genus of moths

Psamatodes is a genus of moths in the family Geometridae erected by Achille Guenée in 1857.

== Species ==
- Psamatodes pallidata (Warren, 1897)
- Psamatodes atrimacularia (Barnes & McDunnough, 1913)
- Psamatodes pernicata (Guenée, 1857)
- Psamatodes nigropunctata (Warren, 1897)
- Psamatodes rectilineata (Warren, 1900)
- Psamatodes rimosata Guenée, 1857
- Psamatodes subdiversa (Warren, 1897)
- Psamatodes ramparia (Schaus)
- Psamatodes limbularia (Hübner)
- Psamatodes memor (Dognin)
- Psamatodes imitatrix (Thierry-Mieg)
- Psamatodes doriteata (Guenée)
- Psamatodes abydata (Guenée, 1857)
- Psamatodes trientata (Herrich-Schäffer, 1870)
- Psamatodes everiata (Guenée, 1857)
- Psamatodes paleolata Guenée, [1858]
- Psamatodes armigerata (Guenée)
- Psamatodes delauta (Felder)
- Psamatodes irrufata (Guenée)
- Psamatodes pandaria (Schaus)
