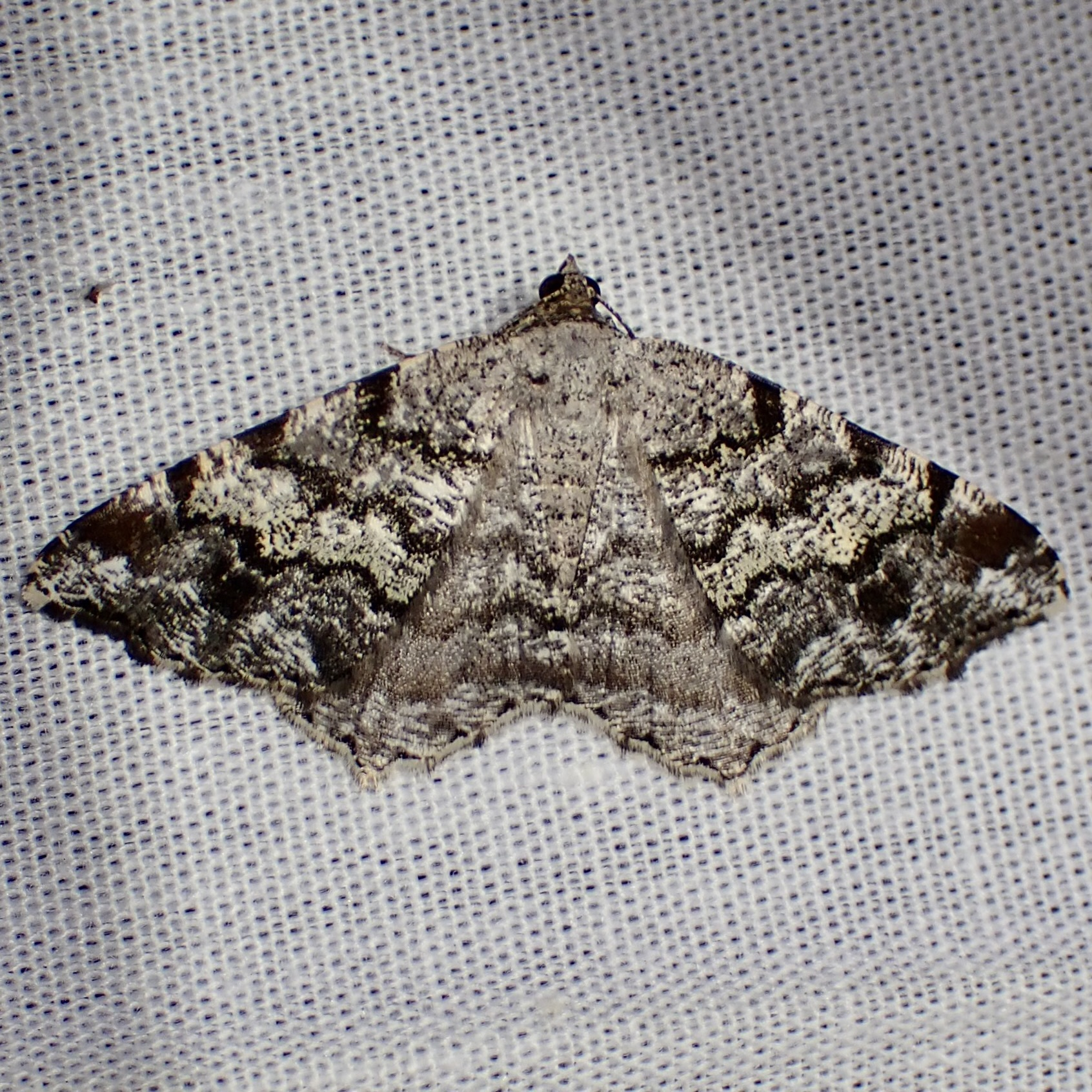

Scientific classification
- Domain: Eukaryota
- Kingdom: Animalia
- Phylum: Arthropoda
- Class: Insecta
- Order: Lepidoptera
- Family: Geometridae
- Genus: Macaria
- Species: M. granitata

Binomial name
- Macaria granitata Guenée, 1857

Synonyms
- Macaria succosata Zeller, 1872; Semiothisa granitata

= Macaria granitata =

Species of insect

Macaria granitata, the granite moth, is a moth of the family Geometridae. It is found in Pennsylvania, Maine, New Hampshire, New England, New Jersey, southern Quebec, Ohio, North Carolina, South Carolina and Georgia.

The wingspan is about 25 mm. There are one to two generations per year.

The larvae mainly feed on Pinus rigida in New England. In southern New Jersey they have been recorded on Pinus rigida and other hard pines.
