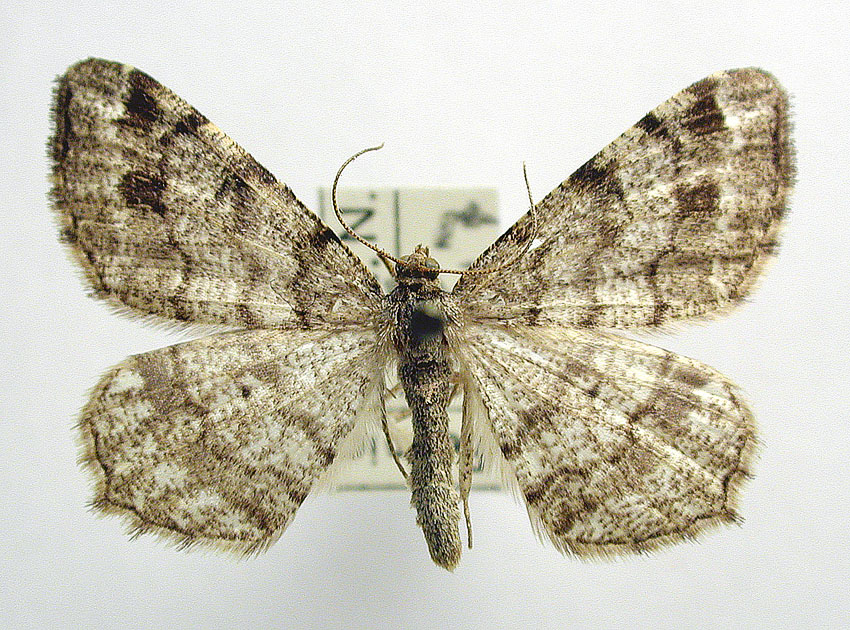
- Pinned adult

Scientific classification
- Domain: Eukaryota
- Kingdom: Animalia
- Phylum: Arthropoda
- Class: Insecta
- Order: Lepidoptera
- Family: Geometridae
- Genus: Macaria
- Species: M. signaria

Binomial name
- Macaria signaria (Hübner, 1809)

Synonyms
- Semiothisa signaria

= Macaria signaria =

Species of moth

Macaria signaria, the dusky peacock, pale-marked angle or spruce-fir looper, is a moth of the family Geometridae. The species was first described by Jacob Hübner in 1809. Subspecies Semiothisa signaria signaria is found in Europe, Turkey, the Caucasus, Transcaucasia, the Ural, Siberia, Far East, Sakhalin, northern Iran and Japan. Subspecies Macaria signaria dispuncta is found in North America (from Yukon and Newfoundland to North Carolina, New Mexico, Arizona and California).

The wingspan is 20–28 mm. The moth flies from May to July depending on the location.

The larvae feed on Picea abies and Larix sibirica.
