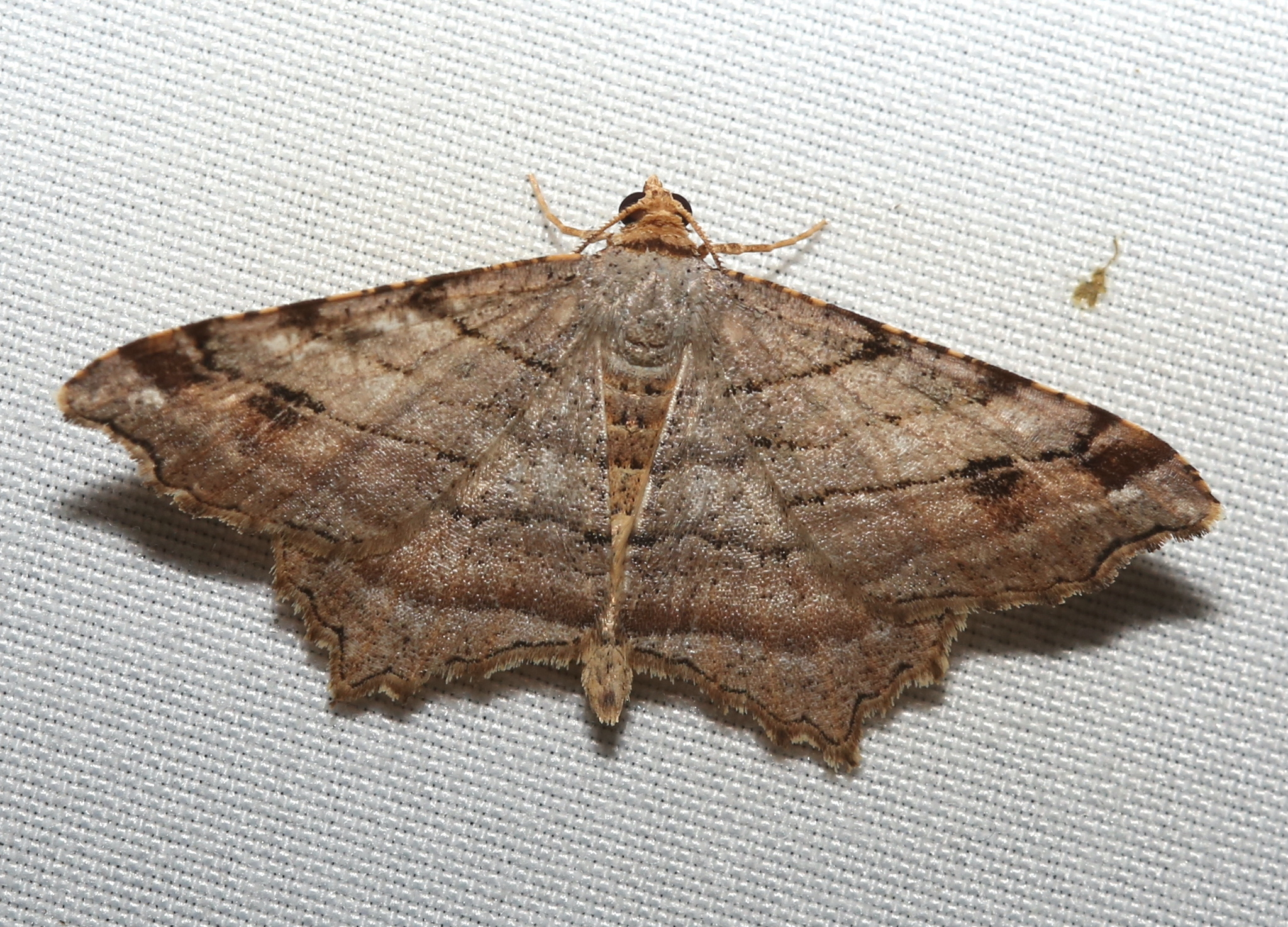

Scientific classification
- Kingdom: Animalia
- Phylum: Arthropoda
- Class: Insecta
- Order: Lepidoptera
- Family: Geometridae
- Genus: Macaria
- Species: M. multilineata

Binomial name
- Macaria multilineata Packard, 1873

Synonyms
- Semiothisa multilineata; Semiothisa patriciata Grote, 1883

= Macaria multilineata =

Species of moth

Macaria multilineata, the many-lined angle, is a moth of the family Geometridae. It is found from New England, New York and Ontario to Florida, west to Oklahoma and Iowa.

The wingspan is 26–28 mm. Adults are on wing from April to September. There are one to two generations per year.

The larvae feed on Chamaecyparis thyoides and Juniperus virginiana.
