= Macaria sanfordi =

Scientific classification
- Domain: Eukaryota
- Kingdom: Animalia
- Phylum: Arthropoda
- Class: Insecta
- Order: Lepidoptera
- Family: Geometridae
- Tribe: Macariini
- Genus: Macaria
- Species: M. sanfordi

Binomial name
- Macaria sanfordi (Rindge, 1958)

Synonyms
- Semiothisa sanfordi Rindge, 1958

Species of moth

Macaria sanfordi is a species of geometrid moth in the family Geometridae.

The MONA or Hodges number for Macaria sanfordi is 6337.
