= Psamatodes everiata =

Scientific classification
- Kingdom: Animalia
- Phylum: Arthropoda
- Class: Insecta
- Order: Lepidoptera
- Family: Geometridae
- Tribe: Macariini
- Genus: Psamatodes
- Species: P. everiata

Binomial name
- Psamatodes everiata (Guenée in Boisduval & Guenée, 1858)

Synonyms
- Macaria everiata Guenée in Boisduval and Guenée, 1858

Species of moth

Psamatodes everiata is a species of geometrid moth in the family Geometridae. It is found in the Caribbean Sea, Central America, North America, and South America.

The MONA or Hodges number for Psamatodes everiata is 6333.

== Subspecies ==
These two subspecies belong to the species Psamatodes everiata:

- Psamatodes everiata errata (McDunnough, 1939)
- Psamatodes everiata everiata (Guenée in Boisduval & Guenée, 1858)
