= Macaria unipunctaria =

Scientific classification
- Domain: Eukaryota
- Kingdom: Animalia
- Phylum: Arthropoda
- Class: Insecta
- Order: Lepidoptera
- Family: Geometridae
- Tribe: Macariini
- Genus: Macaria
- Species: M. unipunctaria

Binomial name
- Macaria unipunctaria (W. S. Wright, 1916)

Synonyms
- Macaria perplexa McDunnough, 1927; Macaria unipunctaria perplexa McDunnough, 1927; Melanolophia unipunctaria W. S. Wright, 1916; Semiothisa unipunctaria perplexa (McDunnough, 1927)

Species of moth

Macaria unipunctaria is a species of geometrid moth in the family Geometridae. It is found in North America.

The MONA or Hodges number for Macaria unipunctaria is 6346.
