= Macaria banksianae =

Scientific classification
- Domain: Eukaryota
- Kingdom: Animalia
- Phylum: Arthropoda
- Class: Insecta
- Order: Lepidoptera
- Family: Geometridae
- Genus: Macaria
- Species: M. banksianae

Binomial name
- Macaria banksianae Ferguson, 1974

Synonyms
- Semiothisa banksianae; Semiothisa marmorata

Species of moth

Macaria banksianae, the jack pine looper, is a moth of the family Geometridae. It is found in North America.

The wingspan is about 23 mm (0.91 in). The larva feeds on Pinus banksiana.
