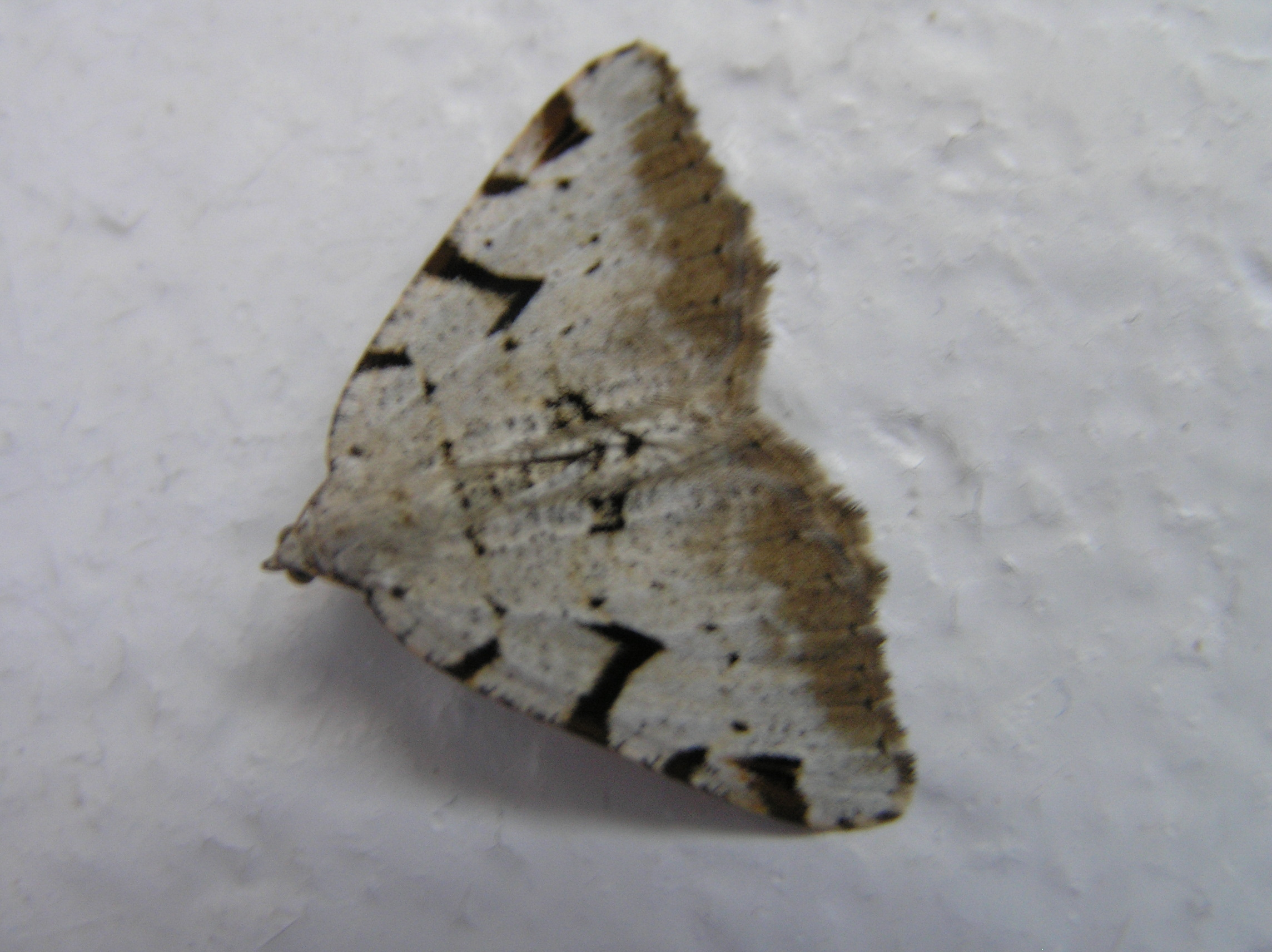

Scientific classification
- Kingdom: Animalia
- Phylum: Arthropoda
- Clade: Pancrustacea
- Class: Insecta
- Order: Lepidoptera
- Family: Geometridae
- Genus: Macaria
- Species: M. wauaria

Binomial name
- Macaria wauaria (Linnaeus, 1758)

Synonyms
- Phalaena wauaria Linnaeus, 1758

= Macaria wauaria =

Species of moth

Macaria wauaria, the V-moth, is a moth of the family Geometridae. It has a Holarctic distribution. The species was first described by Carl Linnaeus in his 1758 10th edition of Systema Naturae.

== Description ==
The length of the forewings is 14–17 mm. All wings have a generally light grey to purple-grey ground colour. The forewing apex is slightly angular. There are four dark brown stains, of which the second from the inside has a distinctive V-shaped angle extended from the costa. The hindwings show a slightly darkened marginal band. The antennae of the males are combed on both sides.The elongated oval egg initially has a green colour, which later turns into brown-red. It has an irregular polygonal network and shows small white warts at the angles. The caterpillars initially have a greenish or bluish colouration. Before pupating, they take on a purple-brown colour. They are provided with black, bristled point warts. The dorsal line is dark and white lined, lateral stripes are wide yellow.The pupa is very slim and reddish brown. At the cremaster end, it is briefly forked.

== Distribution ==
The species occurs from Morocco through northern and central Europe to the Russian Far East, Siberia, Amur, Kamchatka and Central Asia. The northern limit distribution area is Lapland. It also occurs in Labrador, Quebec, Ontario and Nova Scotia. In the mountains it rises to a height of 1700 meters.

== Biology ==
The moth flies from May to July.

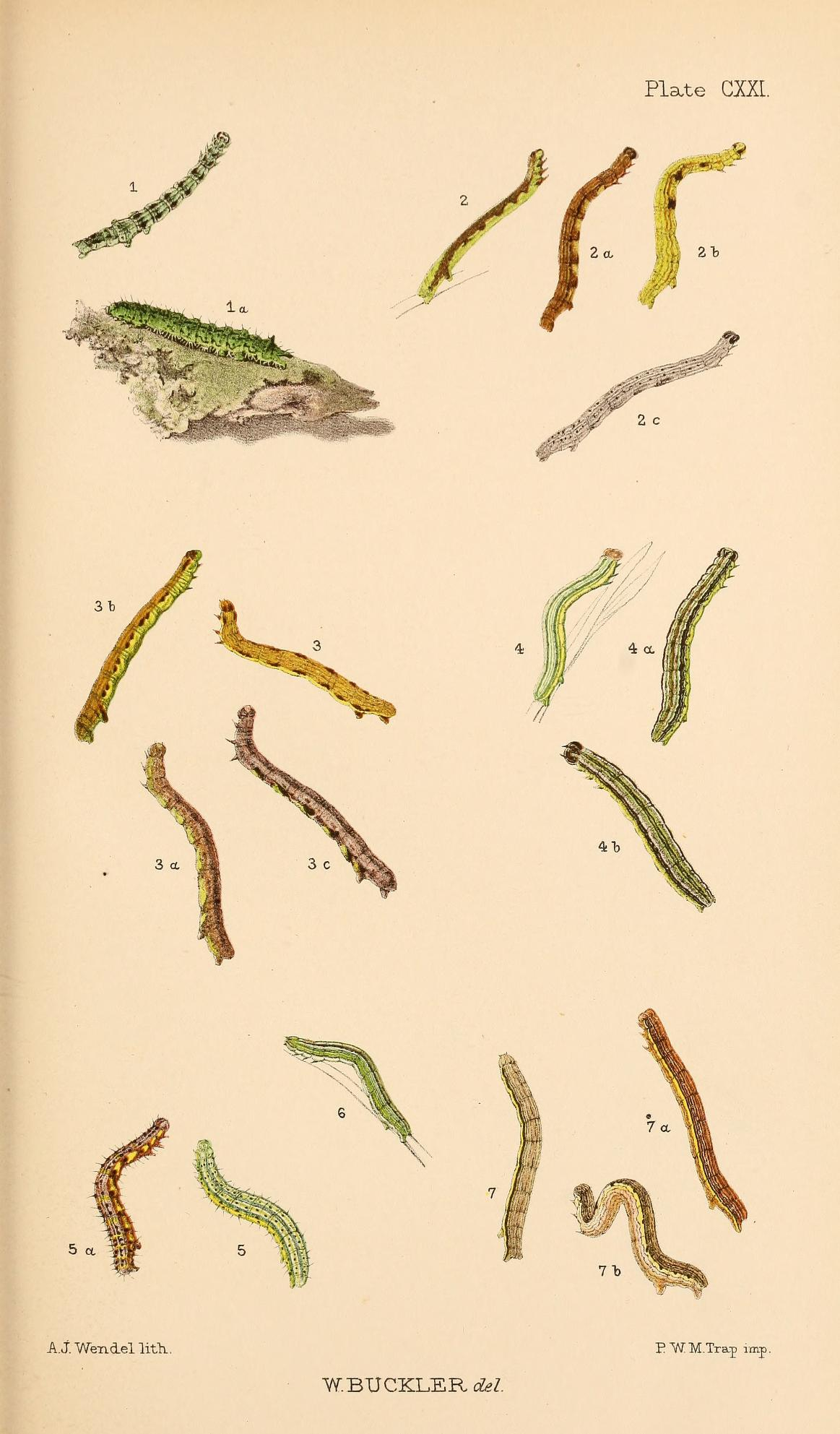
Figs.5, 5a larvae after final moult

The larva feeds on Ribes.

Habitats include hedges, forest edges, orchards, and park landscapes. Also synanthropic in orchards.

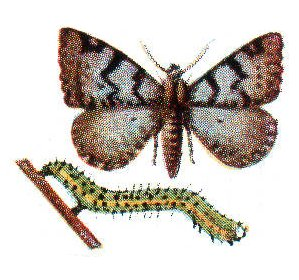

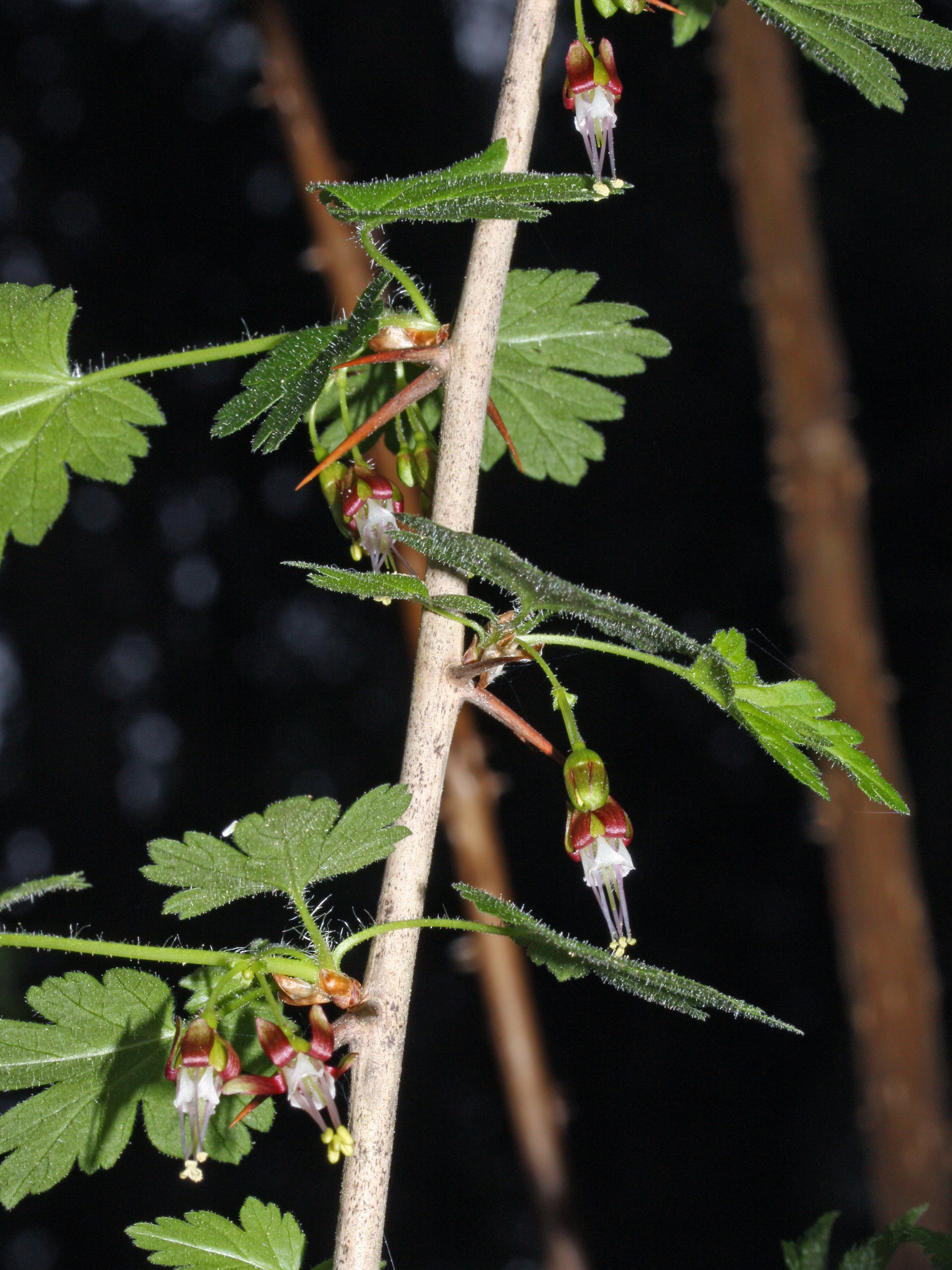

== Notes ==
1. The flight season refers to Belgium and the Netherlands. This may vary in other parts of the range.
