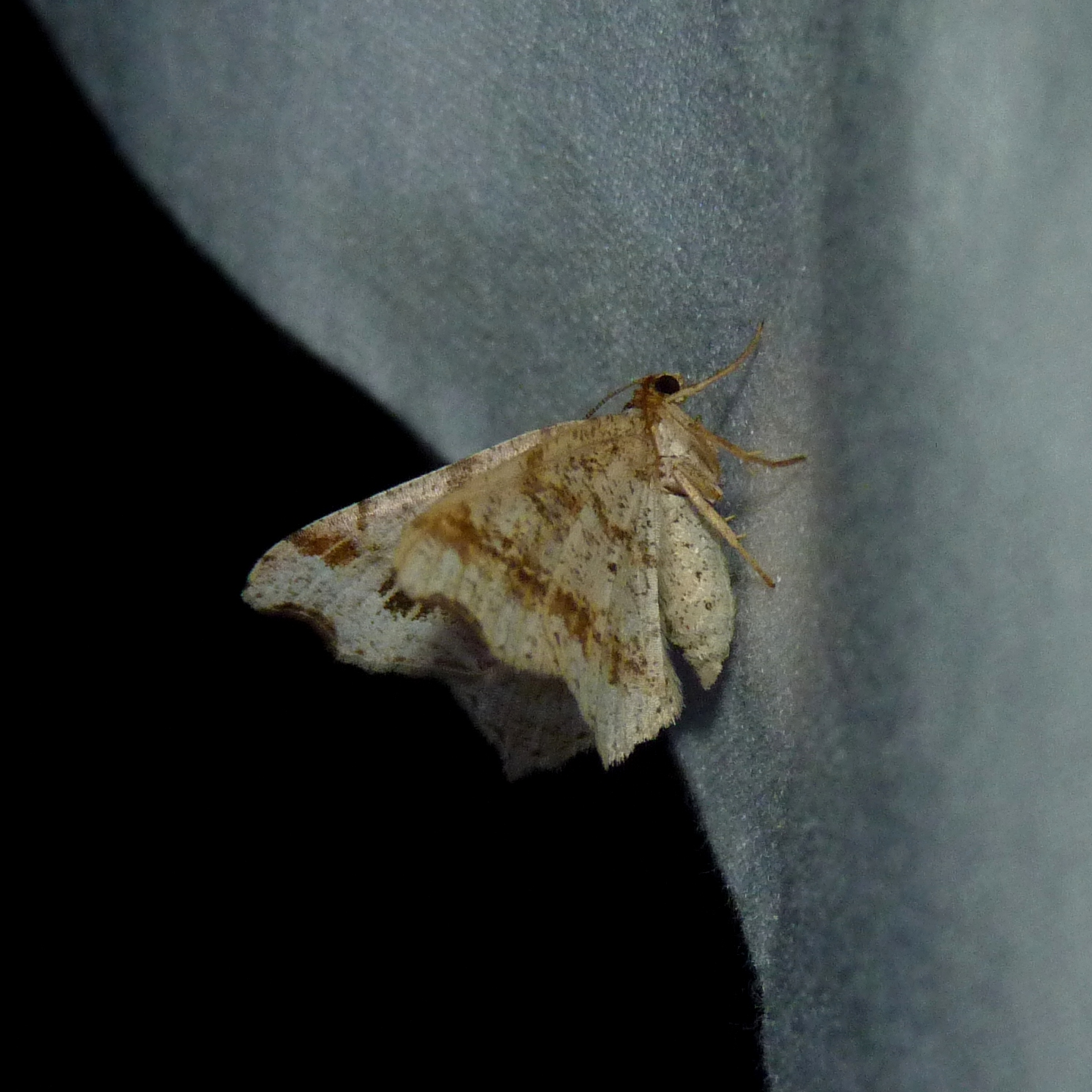

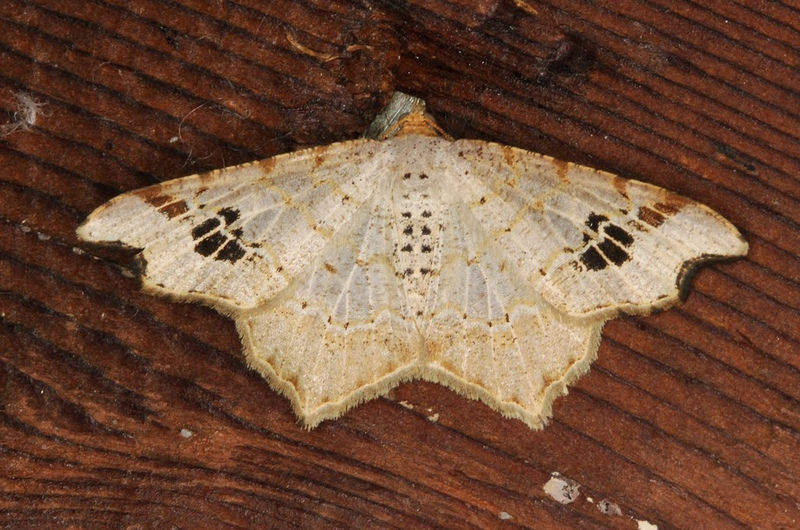

Scientific classification
- Kingdom: Animalia
- Phylum: Arthropoda
- Class: Insecta
- Order: Lepidoptera
- Family: Geometridae
- Genus: Macaria
- Species: M. aemulataria

Binomial name
- Macaria aemulataria Walker, 1861

Synonyms
- Macaria sectomaculata Morrison, 1874; Philobia perplexata Pearsall, 1913; Philobia versitata Pearsall, 1913; Philobia aspirata Pearsall, 1913; Semiothisa perplexata; Semiothisa aspirata; Semiothisa versitata; Semiothisa aemulataria

= Macaria aemulataria =

Species of moth

Macaria aemulataria, the common angle moth, is a moth in the family Geometridae. The species was first described by Francis Walker in 1861. It is found from Nova Scotia to Florida, west to Texas, north to Oregon and Alberta.

The wingspan is 20–22 mm (0.79–0.87 in). Adults are on wing from mid-June to mid-July in Alberta and from May to September in Ohio.

The larvae feed on Acer species.
