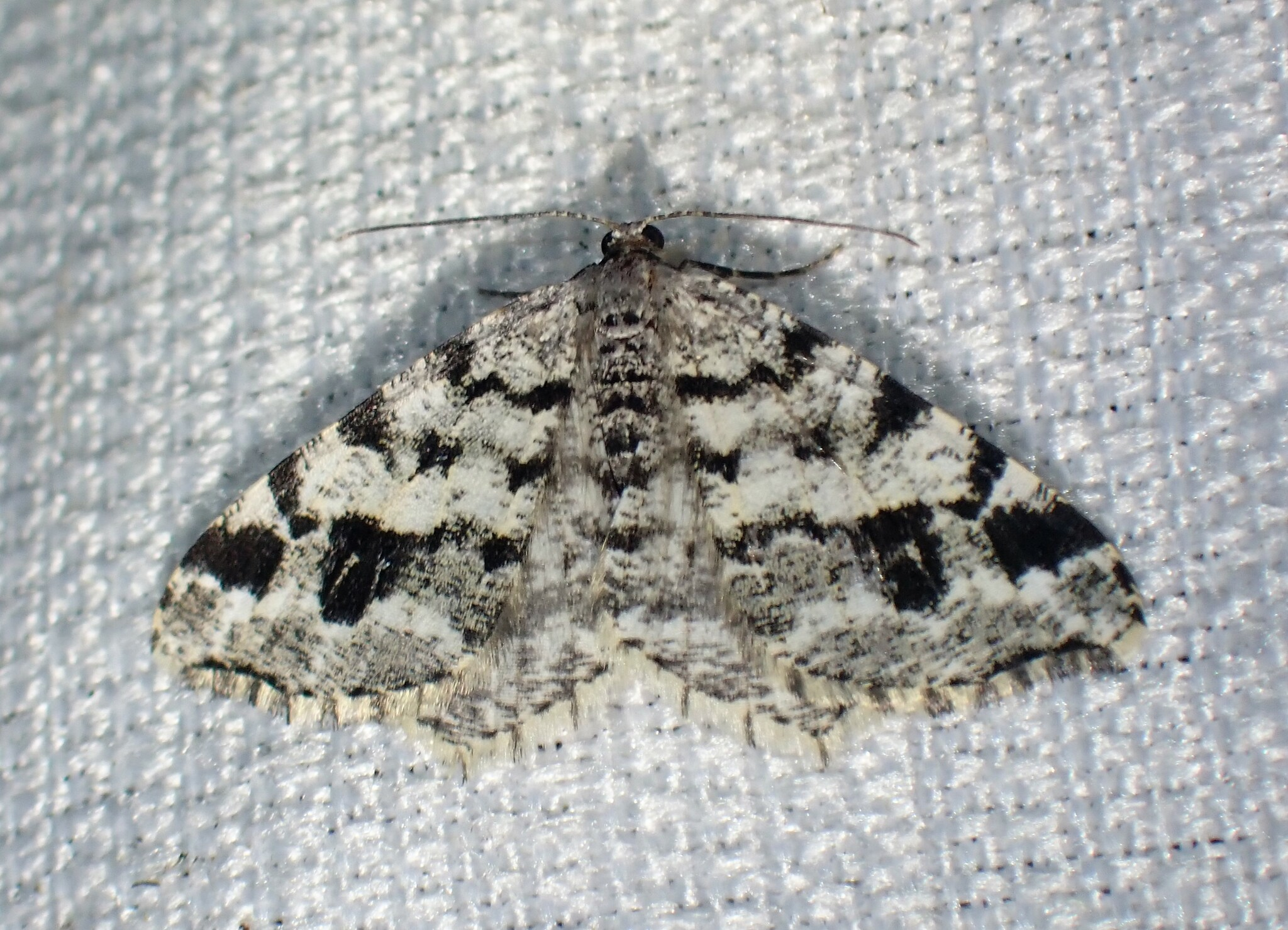

Scientific classification
- Domain: Eukaryota
- Kingdom: Animalia
- Phylum: Arthropoda
- Class: Insecta
- Order: Lepidoptera
- Family: Geometridae
- Genus: Macaria
- Species: M. oweni

Binomial name
- Macaria oweni (Swett, 1907)

Synonyms
- Semiothisa oweni; Digrammia oweni; Sciagraphia granitata var. oweni Swett, 1907

= Macaria oweni =

Species of moth

Macaria oweni, Owen's larch looper or Owen's angle moth, is a moth of the family Geometridae. The species was first described by Louis W. Swett in 1907. It is found in North America from Newfoundland to west-central Alberta, south in the east to northern New England.

The wingspan is about 23 mm. Adults are on wing from June to mid-July in Alberta. There is probably one generation per year.

The larvae feed on Larix laricina.
