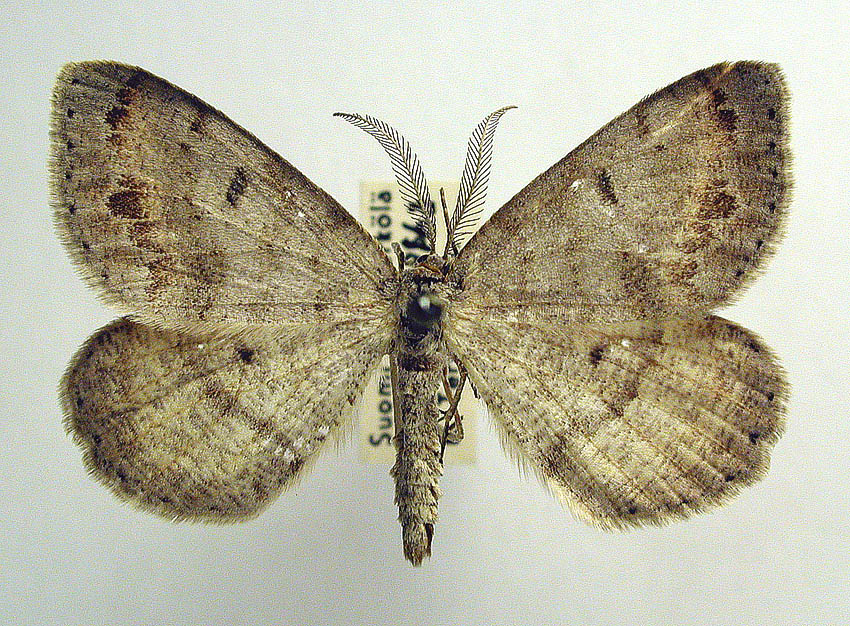
- Male

Scientific classification
- Domain: Eukaryota
- Kingdom: Animalia
- Phylum: Arthropoda
- Class: Insecta
- Order: Lepidoptera
- Family: Geometridae
- Genus: Macaria
- Species: M. loricaria

Binomial name
- Macaria loricaria (Eversmann, 1837)

Synonyms
- Fidonia loricaria Eversmann, 1837; Speranza loricaria; Itame loricaria; Itame loricaria julia; Idaea vinctaria Zeller, 1846; Sympherta julia Hulst, 1896; Thamnonoma nubilata Warren, 1904

= Macaria loricaria =

Species of moth

Macaria loricaria, the false Bruce spanworm or Eversmann's peacock, is a moth of the family Geometridae. It is found from Fennoscandia and the Baltic states to Sakhalin. It is also found in North America, where it is found from Alaska to Newfoundland and New York, south to Colorado.

The wingspan is 25–29 mm for males. Females are wingless. Adults are on wing from mid July to August in Europe and from late June to late July in North America.

The larvae feed on Salix and Betula species as well as Populus tremuloides in North America. Larvae can be found from May to July It overwinters as an egg.
