= Psamatodes trientata =

Scientific classification
- Domain: Eukaryota
- Kingdom: Animalia
- Phylum: Arthropoda
- Class: Insecta
- Order: Lepidoptera
- Family: Geometridae
- Tribe: Macariini
- Genus: Psamatodes
- Species: P. trientata

Binomial name
- Psamatodes trientata (Herrich-Schäffer, 1870)

Synonyms
- Macaria trientata Herrich-Schäffer, 1870

Species of moth

Psamatodes trientata is a species of geometrid moth in the family Geometridae. It is found in the Caribbean Sea, Central America, and North America.

The MONA or Hodges number for Psamatodes trientata is 6332.1.
