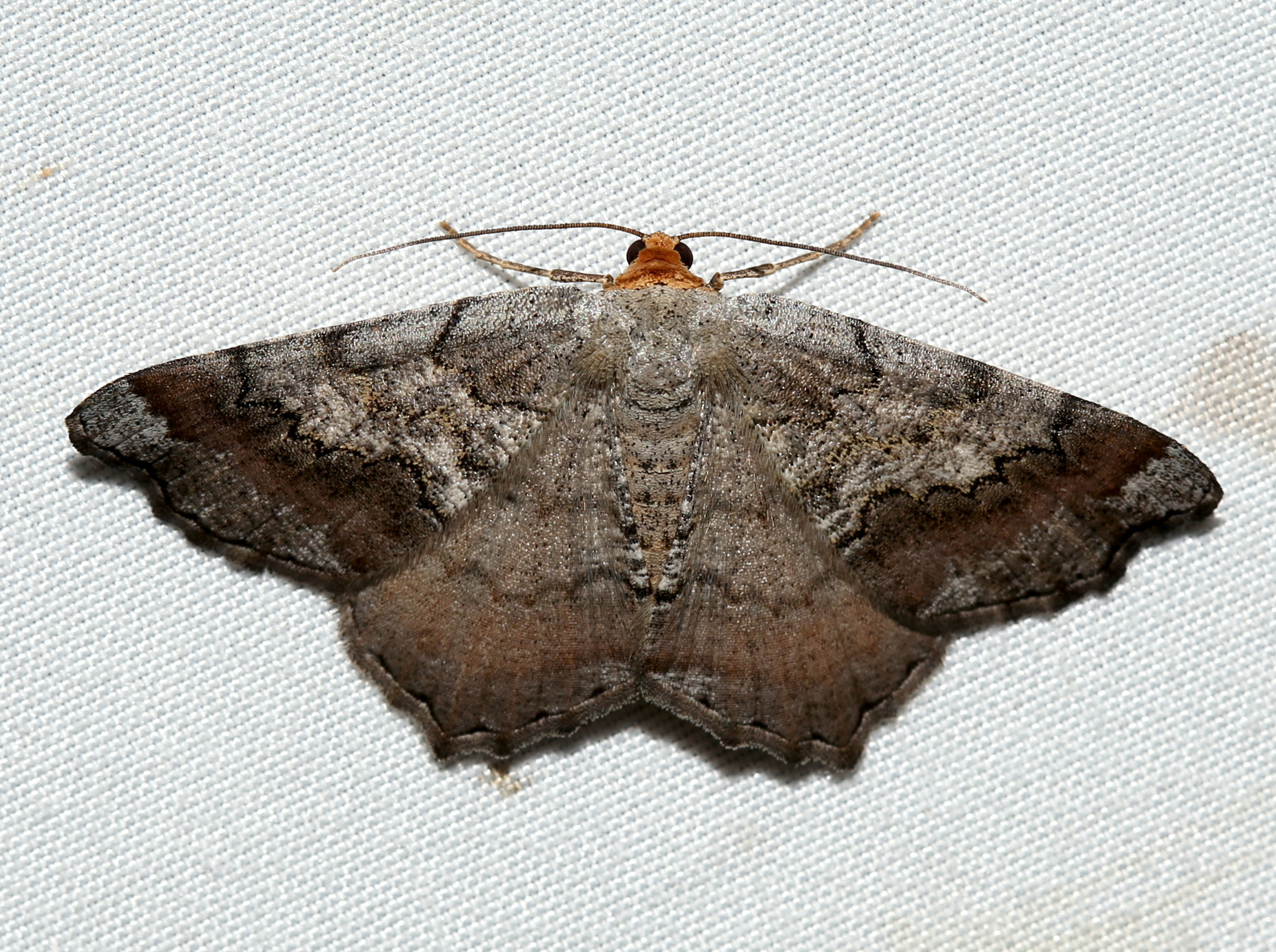

Scientific classification
- Kingdom: Animalia
- Phylum: Arthropoda
- Class: Insecta
- Order: Lepidoptera
- Family: Geometridae
- Tribe: Macariini
- Genus: Macaria
- Species: M. distribuaria

Binomial name
- Macaria distribuaria (Hubner, 1825)

Synonyms
- Eutropa distribuaria Hübner, 1825; Macaria oppositaria Guenée, 1857; Macaria proxantha Walker, [1863]; Semiothisa distribuaria

= Macaria distribuaria =

Species of moth

Macaria distribuaria, the southern coastal plain angle moth, is a species of geometrid moth in the family Geometridae. It is found in the Caribbean Sea, Central America, and North America.

The MONA or Hodges number for Macaria distribuaria is 6336.
