= Macaria ponderosae =

Scientific classification
- Domain: Eukaryota
- Kingdom: Animalia
- Phylum: Arthropoda
- Class: Insecta
- Order: Lepidoptera
- Family: Geometridae
- Tribe: Macariini
- Genus: Macaria
- Species: M. ponderosae

Binomial name
- Macaria ponderosae Ferguson, 2008

Species of moth

Macaria ponderosae is a species of geometrid moth in the family Geometridae. It is found in North America.

The MONA or Hodges number for Macaria ponderosae is 6338.1.
