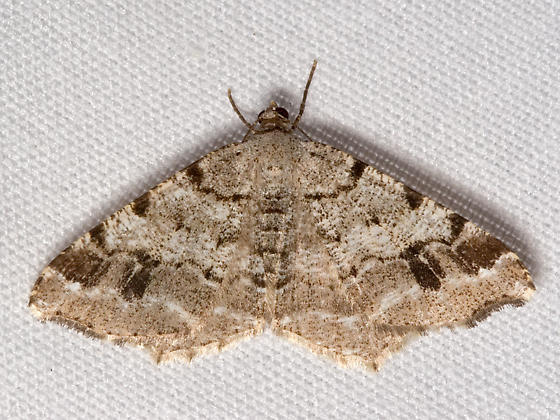

Scientific classification
- Kingdom: Animalia
- Phylum: Arthropoda
- Class: Insecta
- Order: Lepidoptera
- Family: Geometridae
- Genus: Macaria
- Species: M. fissinotata

Binomial name
- Macaria fissinotata Walker, 1863

Synonyms
- Macaria retinotata; Semiothisa fissinotata

= Macaria fissinotata =

Species of moth

Macaria fissinotata, the hemlock angle, is a moth of the family Geometridae. It is found in North America from Nova Scotia to Georgia, west to Kentucky, north to Ontario. The wingspan is 22–25 mm. The moth flies from May to September and from May to July in Quebec.

Its Latin name fissinotata is composed of the Latin word "fissus" (meaning cleaved or split) and "notatus" (mark). This probably refers to the forewing's large spot which is often split into two.

The larvae feed on Tsuga and Picea species, as well as Abies balsamea.
