= Psamatodes atrimacularia =

Scientific classification
- Domain: Eukaryota
- Kingdom: Animalia
- Phylum: Arthropoda
- Class: Insecta
- Order: Lepidoptera
- Family: Geometridae
- Genus: Psamatodes
- Species: P. atrimacularia

Binomial name
- Psamatodes atrimacularia (Barnes & McDunnough, 1913)

Synonyms
- Macaria atrimacularia Barnes & McDunnough, 1913

Species of moth

Psamatodes atrimacularia is a species of moth in the family Geometridae first described by William Barnes and James Halliday McDunnough in 1913. It is found in North America.

The MONA or Hodges number for Psamatodes atrimacularia is 6328.1.
