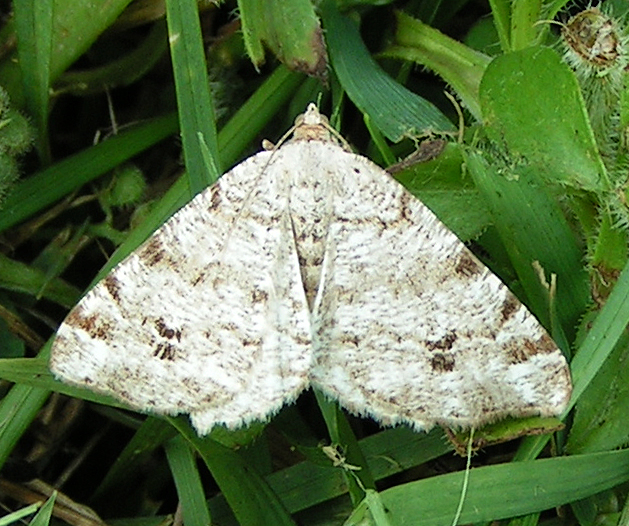
- Adult

Scientific classification
- Domain: Eukaryota
- Kingdom: Animalia
- Phylum: Arthropoda
- Class: Insecta
- Order: Lepidoptera
- Family: Geometridae
- Genus: Macaria
- Species: M. pinistrobata

Binomial name
- Macaria pinistrobata (Ferguson, 1972)

Synonyms
- Semiothisa pinistrobata Ferguson, 1972

= Macaria pinistrobata =

Species of moth

Macaria pinistrobata, the white pine angle, is a moth of the family Geometridae. It is found in the Eastern United States as well as the Canadian provinces of Ontario, Quebec, New Brunswick, Prince Edward Island, and Nova Scotia.

== Life history ==
There are one to two generations per year. As the common name suggests, larvae feed on White pine.

== Distribution ==
The white pine angle ranges from its southernmost distribution in northern Georgia through the Appalachians into the Great Lakes region and New England.
