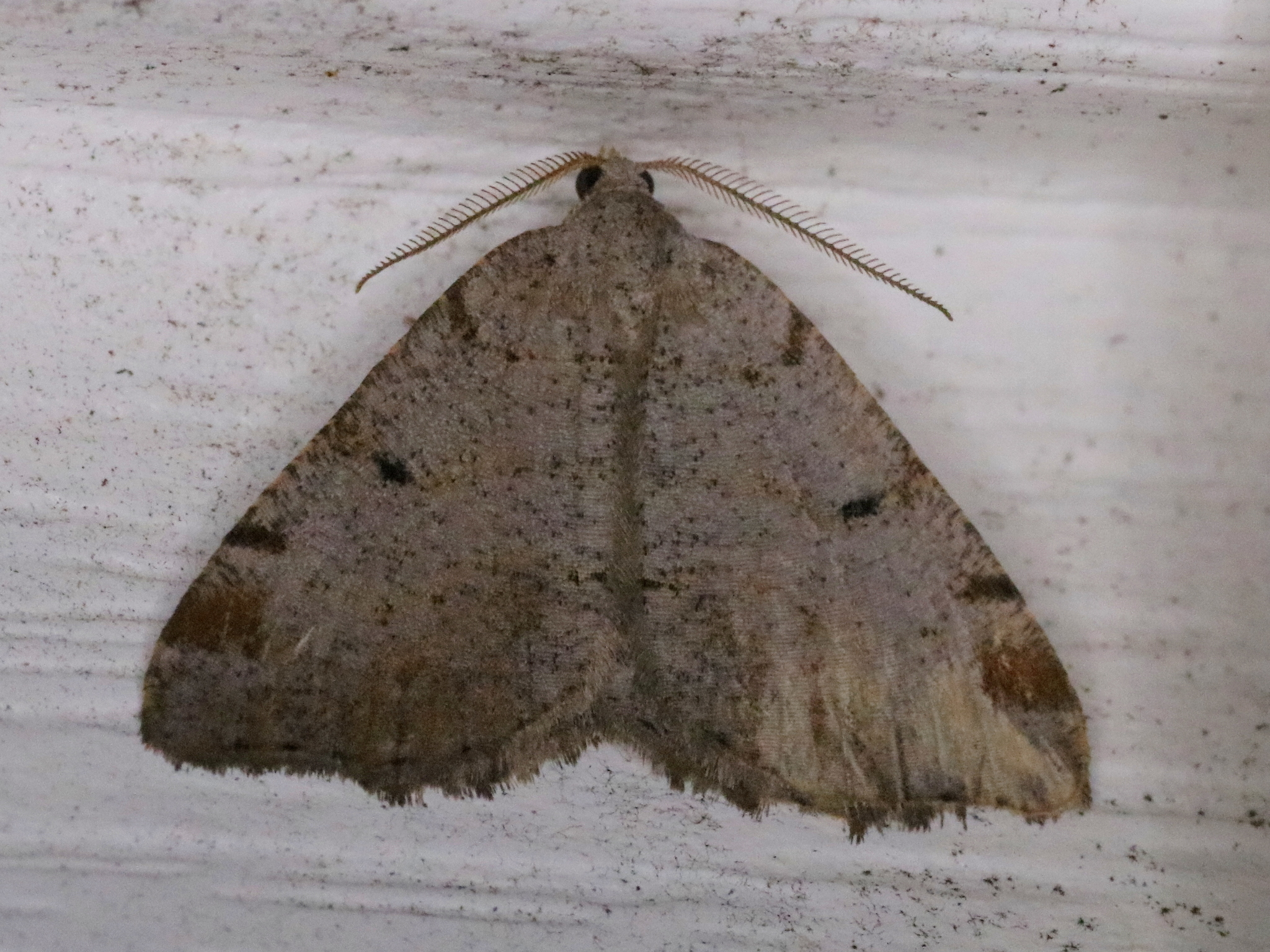

Scientific classification
- Kingdom: Animalia
- Phylum: Arthropoda
- Class: Insecta
- Order: Lepidoptera
- Family: Geometridae
- Genus: Macaria
- Species: M. anataria

Binomial name
- Macaria anataria (Swett, 1913)

Synonyms
- Diastictis anataria; Itame anataria; Speranza anataria

= Macaria anataria =

Moth species

Macaria anataria, commonly known as the duck geometer moth, is a species of moth in the family Geometridae. It was first described by Louis W. Swett in 1913.
