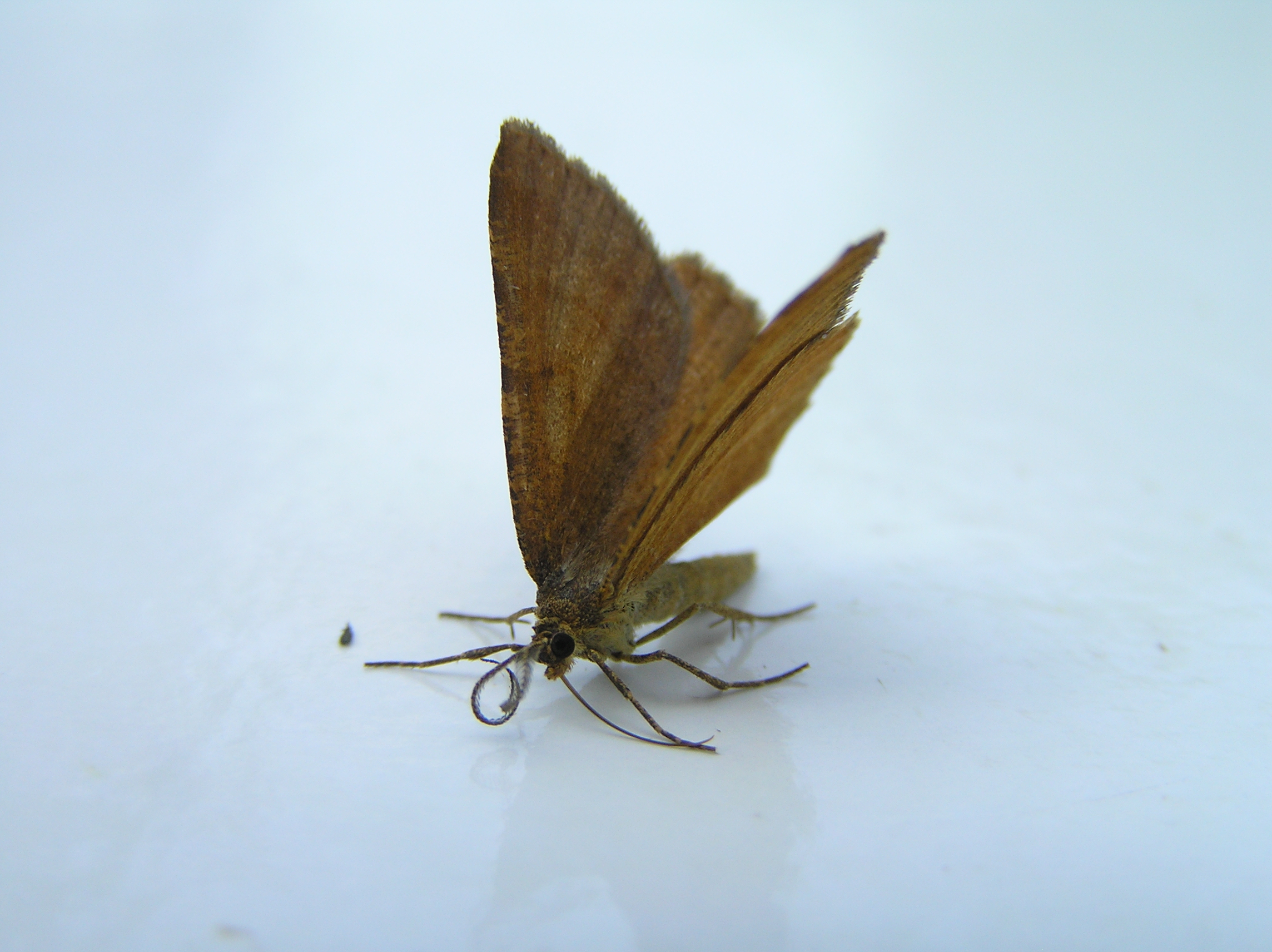

Scientific classification
- Domain: Eukaryota
- Kingdom: Animalia
- Phylum: Arthropoda
- Class: Insecta
- Order: Lepidoptera
- Family: Geometridae
- Genus: Macaria
- Species: M. brunneata

Binomial name
- Macaria brunneata (Thunberg, 1784)

Synonyms
- Itame brunneata; Semiothisa brunneata; Speranza brunneata Thunberg, 1784; Geometra brunneata Thunberg, 1784; Phalaena fulvaria Villers, 1789; Geometra pinetaria Hübner, [1799]; Geometra quinquaria Hübner, [1822]; Speranza sylvaria Curtis, 1828; Eupistheria[sic] ferruginaria Packard, 1873

= Macaria brunneata =

Species of moth

Macaria brunneata, the Rannoch looper, is a moth of the family Geometridae. The species was first described by Carl Peter Thunberg in 1784. It is found in Siberia, Japan, and northern and mountainous parts of North America, and throughout Europe, though in Britain it is largely or entirely restricted to mature forests in central Scotland.

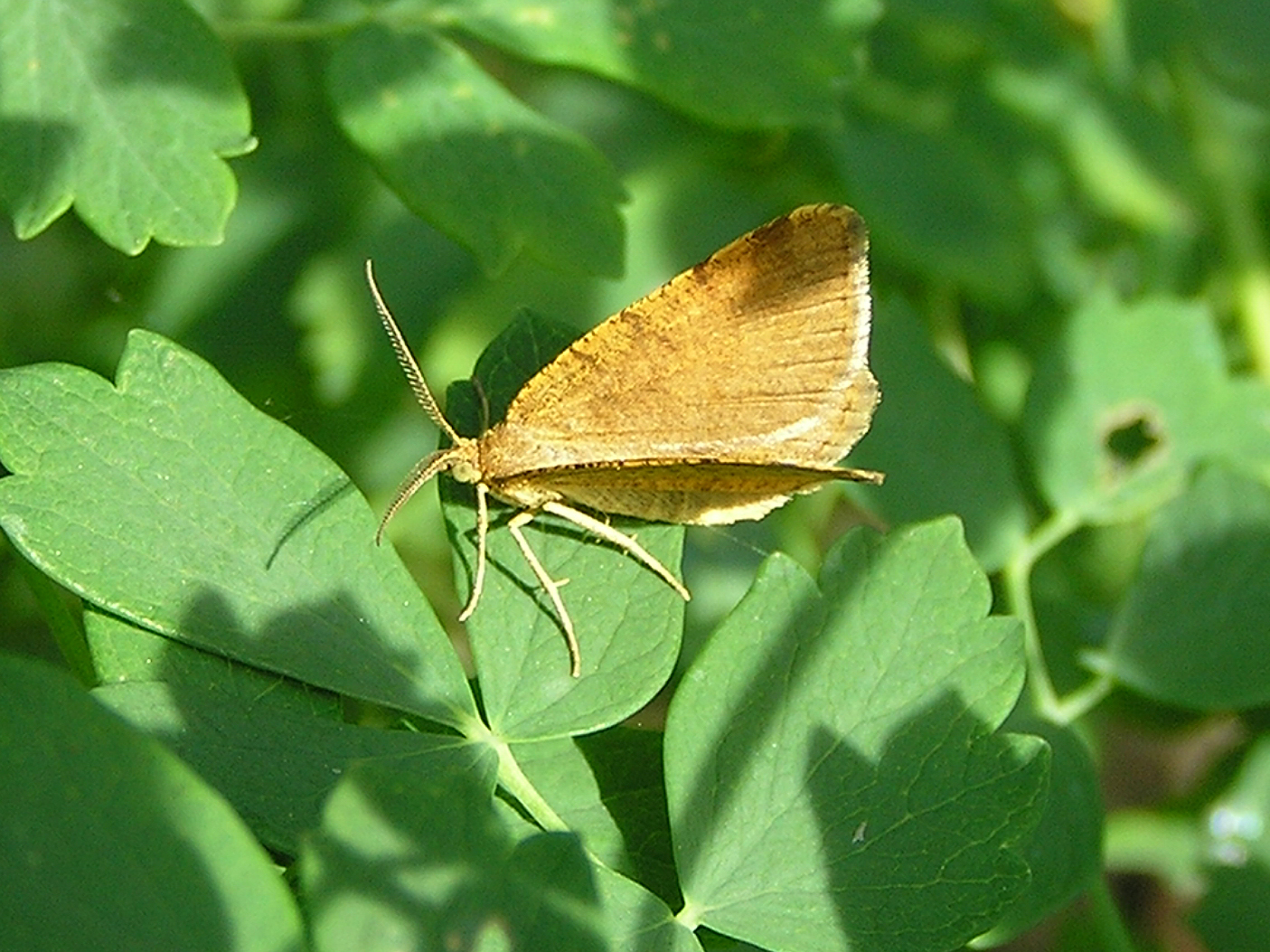

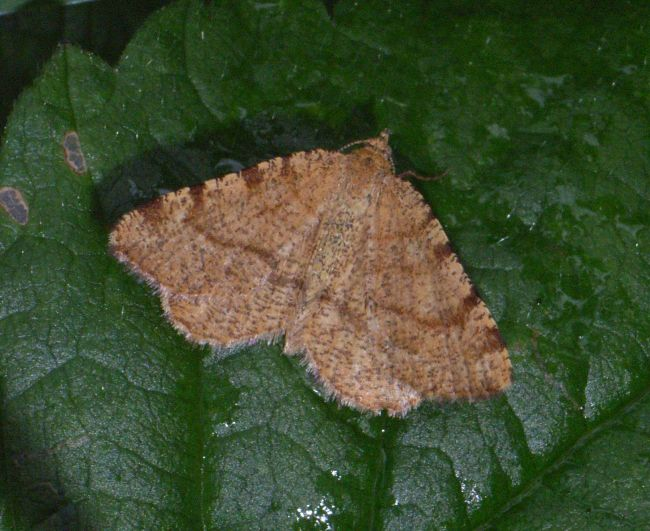

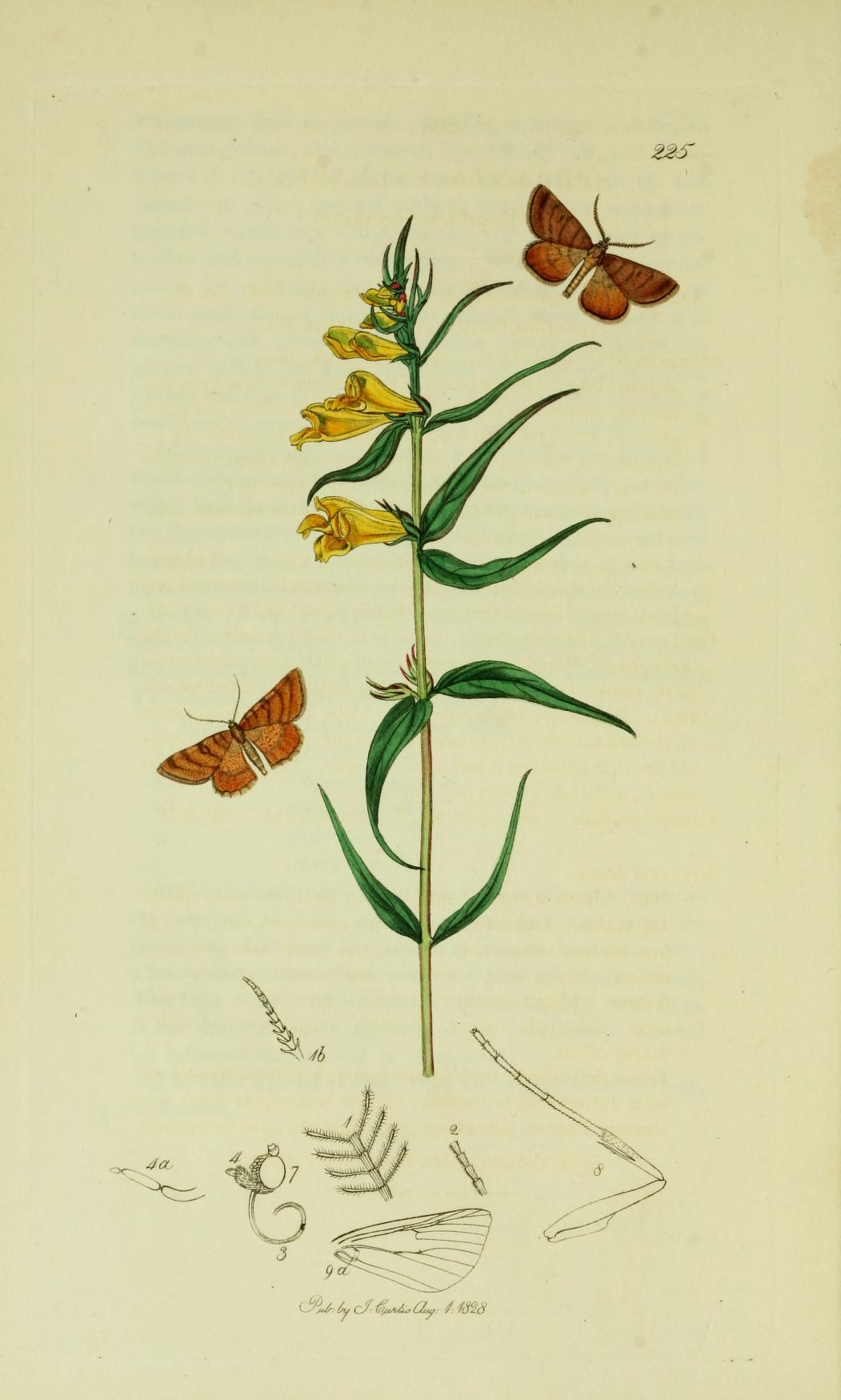
Illustration from John Curtis's British Entomology Volume 6

The wingspan is 25–30 mm (0.98–1.18 in). The length of the forewings is 11–13 mm (0.43–0.51 in). It flies during the day, and when at rest often holds its wings closed as a butterfly does. The moth flies in June and July in Britain and in July and August in North America.

The caterpillars feed on bilberry in Britain and on that and other plants of the heath family, such as bearberry, in North America.
