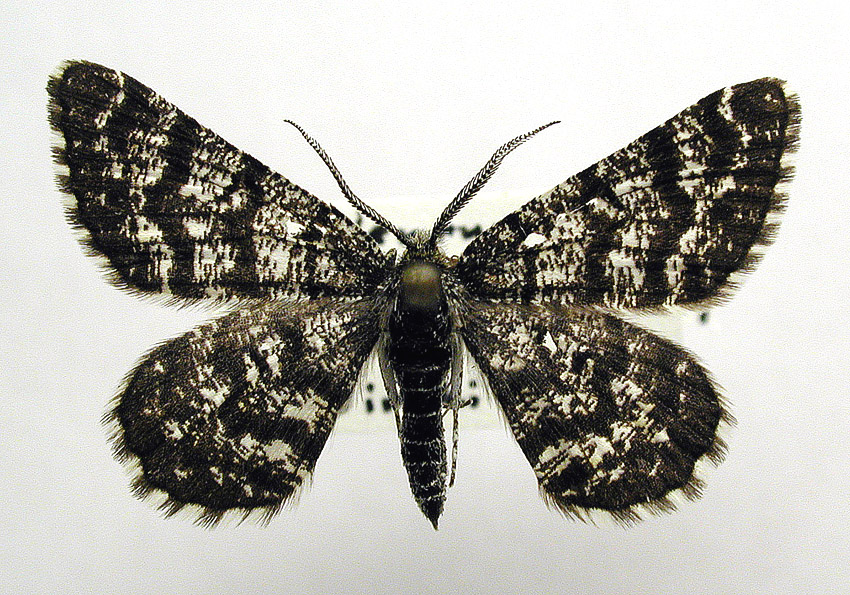

Scientific classification
- Domain: Eukaryota
- Kingdom: Animalia
- Phylum: Arthropoda
- Class: Insecta
- Order: Lepidoptera
- Family: Geometridae
- Genus: Macaria
- Species: M. carbonaria

Binomial name
- Macaria carbonaria (Clerck, 1759)

Synonyms
- Phalaena carbonaria Clerck, 1759; Semiothisa carbonaria

= Macaria carbonaria =

Species of moth

Macaria carbonaria, the netted mountain moth, is a moth of the family Geometridae. The species was first described by Carl Alexander Clerck in 1759. It is found in the northern part of the Palearctic realm.

The wingspan is 23–25 mm (0.91–0.98 in). Adults are on wing from April to June. It is a day-flying species and can be found visiting the flowers of various plants.

The larvae feed on Arctostaphylos uva-ursi.
