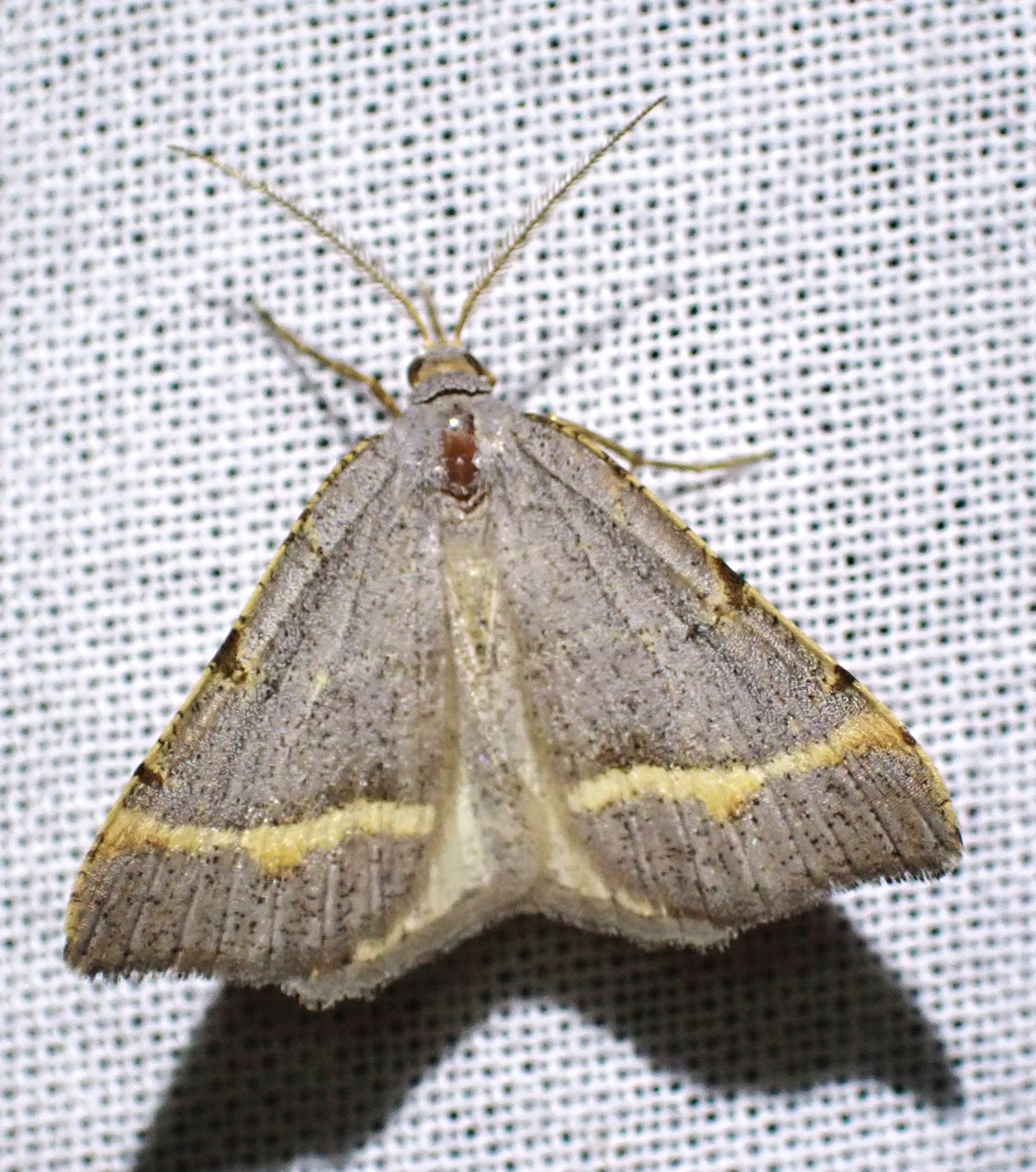

Scientific classification
- Kingdom: Animalia
- Phylum: Arthropoda
- Clade: Pancrustacea
- Class: Insecta
- Order: Lepidoptera
- Family: Geometridae
- Genus: Macaria
- Species: M. guenearia

Binomial name
- Macaria guenearia (Packard, 1876)

= Macaria guenearia =

Species of moth

Macaria guenearia is a species of moth found in California, United States.
