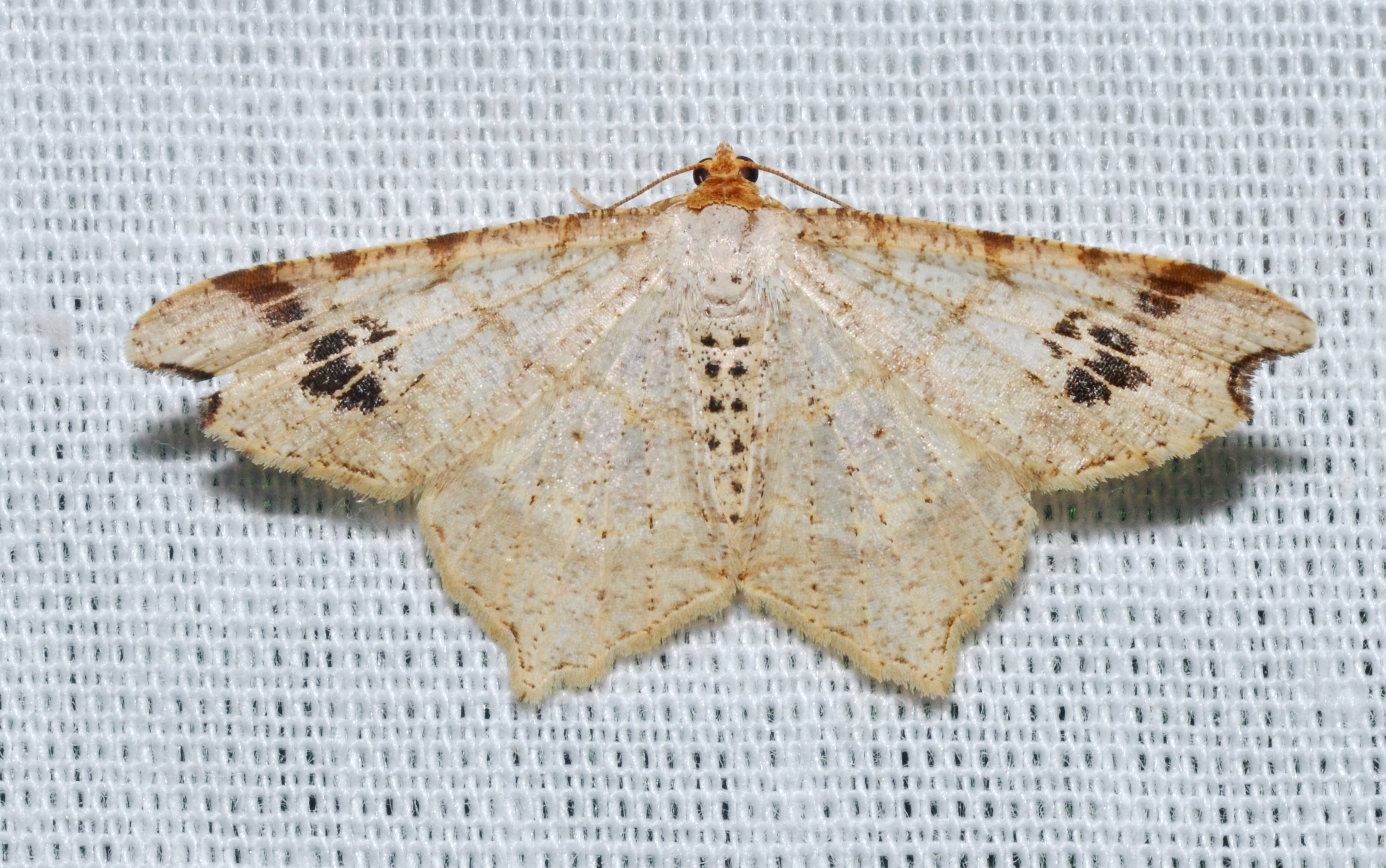

Scientific classification
- Domain: Eukaryota
- Kingdom: Animalia
- Phylum: Arthropoda
- Class: Insecta
- Order: Lepidoptera
- Family: Geometridae
- Tribe: Macariini
- Genus: Macaria
- Species: M. promiscuata

Binomial name
- Macaria promiscuata (Ferguson, 1974)

Synonyms
- Semiothisa promiscuata Ferguson, 1974

= Macaria promiscuata =

Species of moth

Macaria promiscuata, the promiscuous angle, is a species of geometrid moth in the family Geometridae.

The MONA or Hodges number for Macaria promiscuata is 6331.
