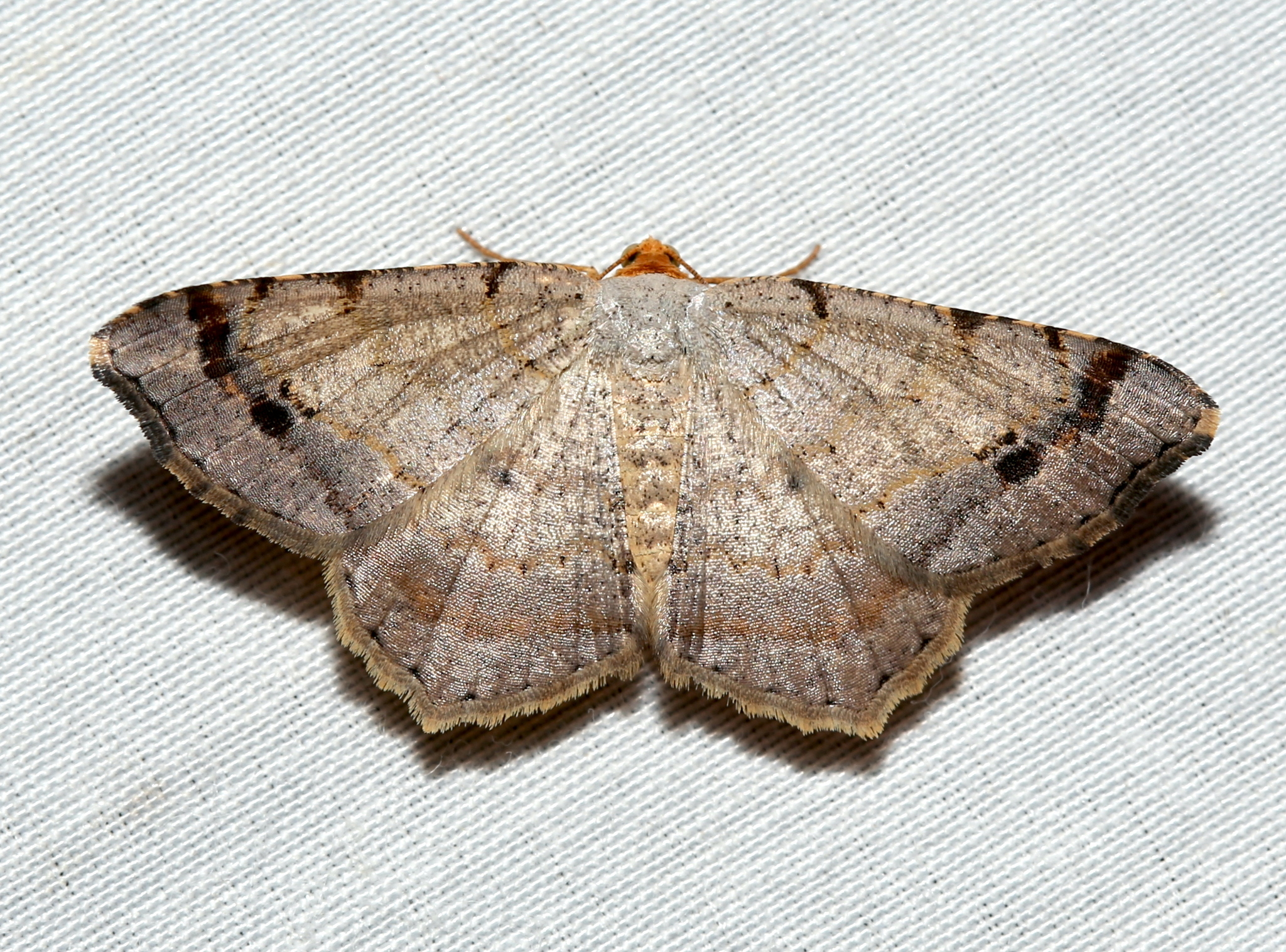

Scientific classification
- Kingdom: Animalia
- Phylum: Arthropoda
- Class: Insecta
- Order: Lepidoptera
- Family: Geometridae
- Genus: Macaria
- Species: M. bicolorata

Binomial name
- Macaria bicolorata Fabricius, 1798

Synonyms
- Semiothisa bicolorata; Phalaena bicolorata Fabricius, 1798; Macaria concepta Walker, 1861; Macaria consimilata Zeller, 1872; Macaria grassata Hulst, 1881; Phalaena praeatomata Haworth, 1809

= Macaria bicolorata =

Species of moth

Macaria bicolorata, the bicolored angle, is a moth of the family Geometridae. It is found in Eastern North America.

The wingspan is about 30 mm (1.2 in). The moths are on wing from May to August depending on the location.

The larvae feed on Pinus species.
