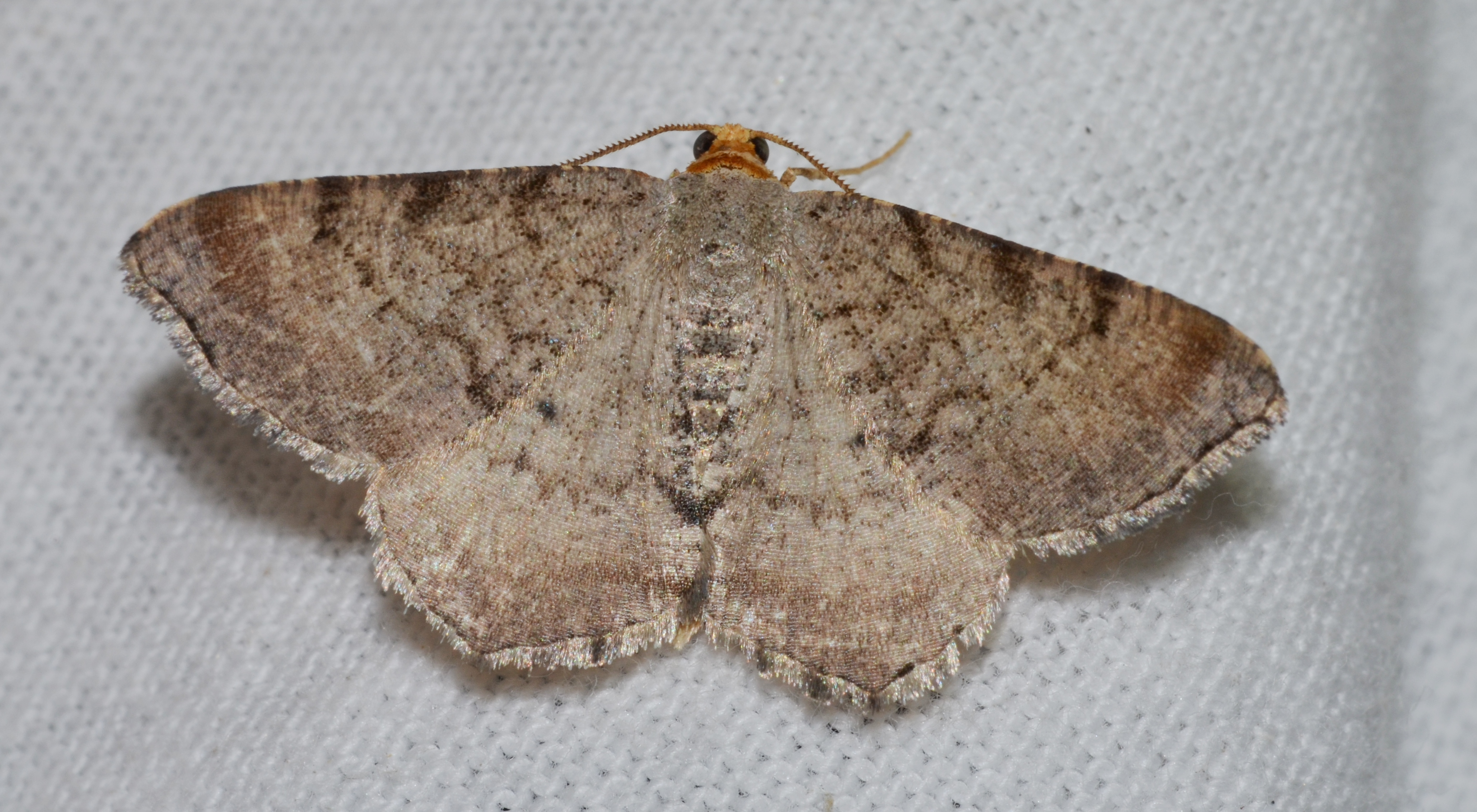

Scientific classification
- Kingdom: Animalia
- Phylum: Arthropoda
- Clade: Pancrustacea
- Class: Insecta
- Order: Lepidoptera
- Family: Geometridae
- Genus: Macaria
- Species: M. minorata

Binomial name
- Macaria minorata Packard, 1873

Synonyms
- Semiothisa minorata

= Macaria minorata =

Species of moth

Macaria minorata, the minor angle moth, is a moth of the family Geometridae. The species was first described by Alpheus Spring Packard in 1873. It is found in North America, where it has been recorded from Nova Scotia to Ontario, Quebec, Minnesota, New England, Maryland, North Carolina, South Carolina and Georgia.

The wingspan is about 21 mm. Adults have been recorded on wing from March to October, with most records between May and August in one to two generations per year.

The larvae feed on Pinus strobus. Full-grown larvae can be found from July to October.
