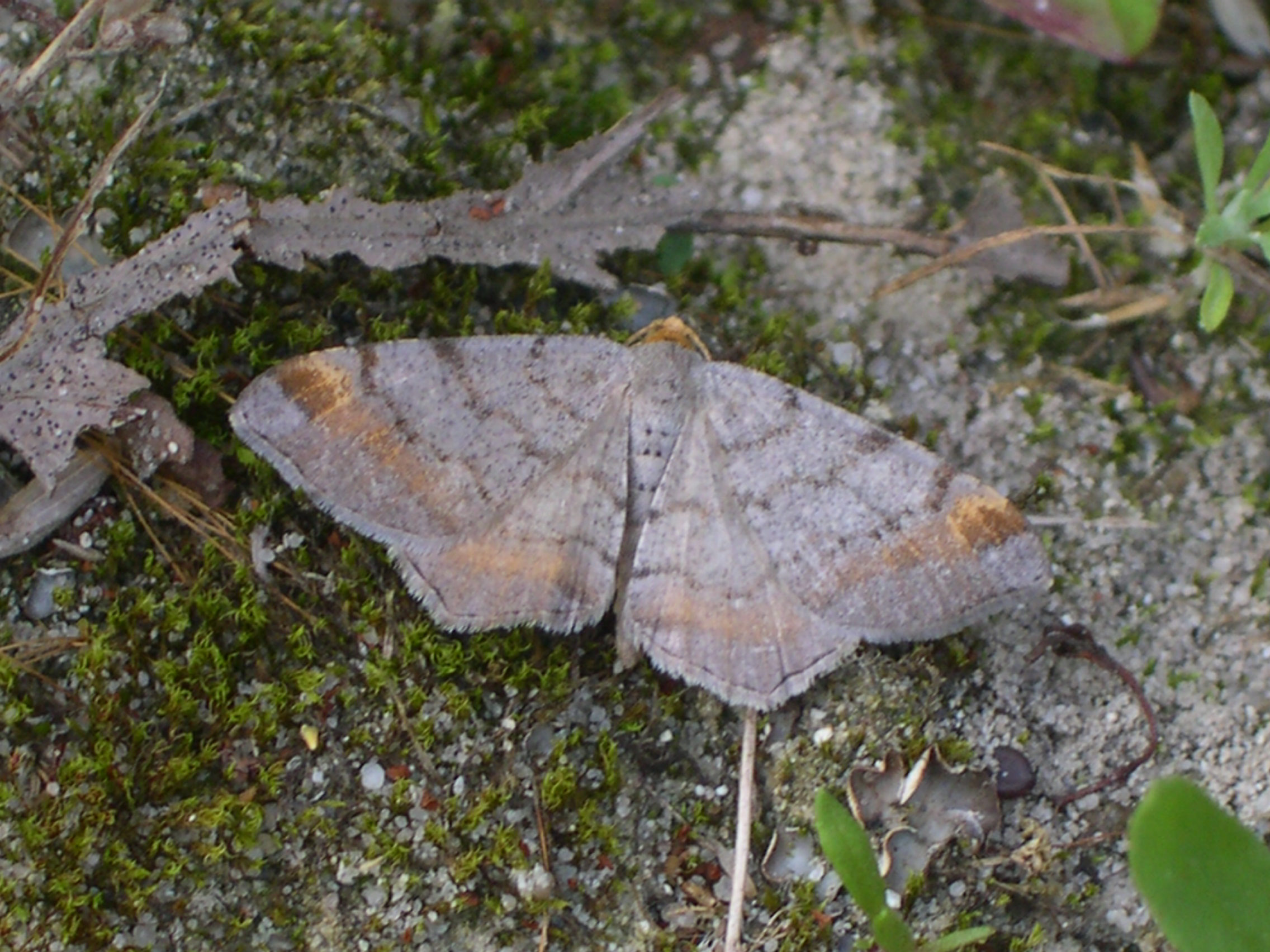

Scientific classification
- Kingdom: Animalia
- Phylum: Arthropoda
- Class: Insecta
- Order: Lepidoptera
- Family: Geometridae
- Genus: Macaria
- Species: M. liturata

Binomial name
- Macaria liturata (Clerck, 1759)

Synonyms
- Semiothisa liturata

= Macaria liturata =

Species of moth

Macaria liturata, the tawny-barred angle, is a moth of the family Geometridae. It was first described by Carl Alexander Clerck in 1759 and it is found throughout Europe and across the Palearctic east to Japan.

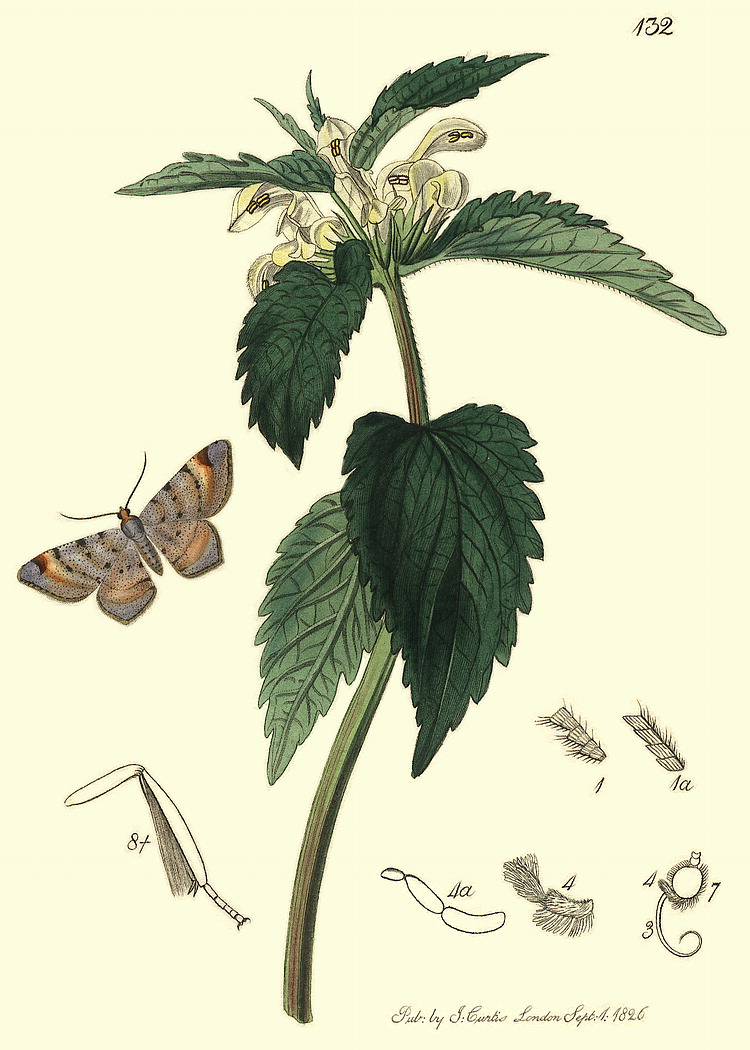
Illustration from John Curtis's British Entomology Volume 6

== Distribution ==
It is found from the British Isles to Siberia, the Russian Far East and Japan. In the south and western Mediterranean it is found in Italy, the Balkans and the Black Sea region and the Caucasus. In the north it occurs above the Arctic Circle. It rises to about 1600 meters above sea level in the Alps. The nominate subspecies is found in the West Palearctic and Macaria liturata pressaria is found in the East Palearctic.

== Description ==
The wingspan is 22–27 mm. The length of the forewings is 11–13 mm. The wings have a purple-grey ground colour. There are three dark crossbars on the forewings, which are thickened at the front edge and often dissolve into points. A wide reddish-yellow transverse band is visible behind the outer cross line, beginning with a brownish red stain on the front edge and continuing on to the hindwings. The forewings are slightly indented below the apex, the hindwings show a short tip in the middle.

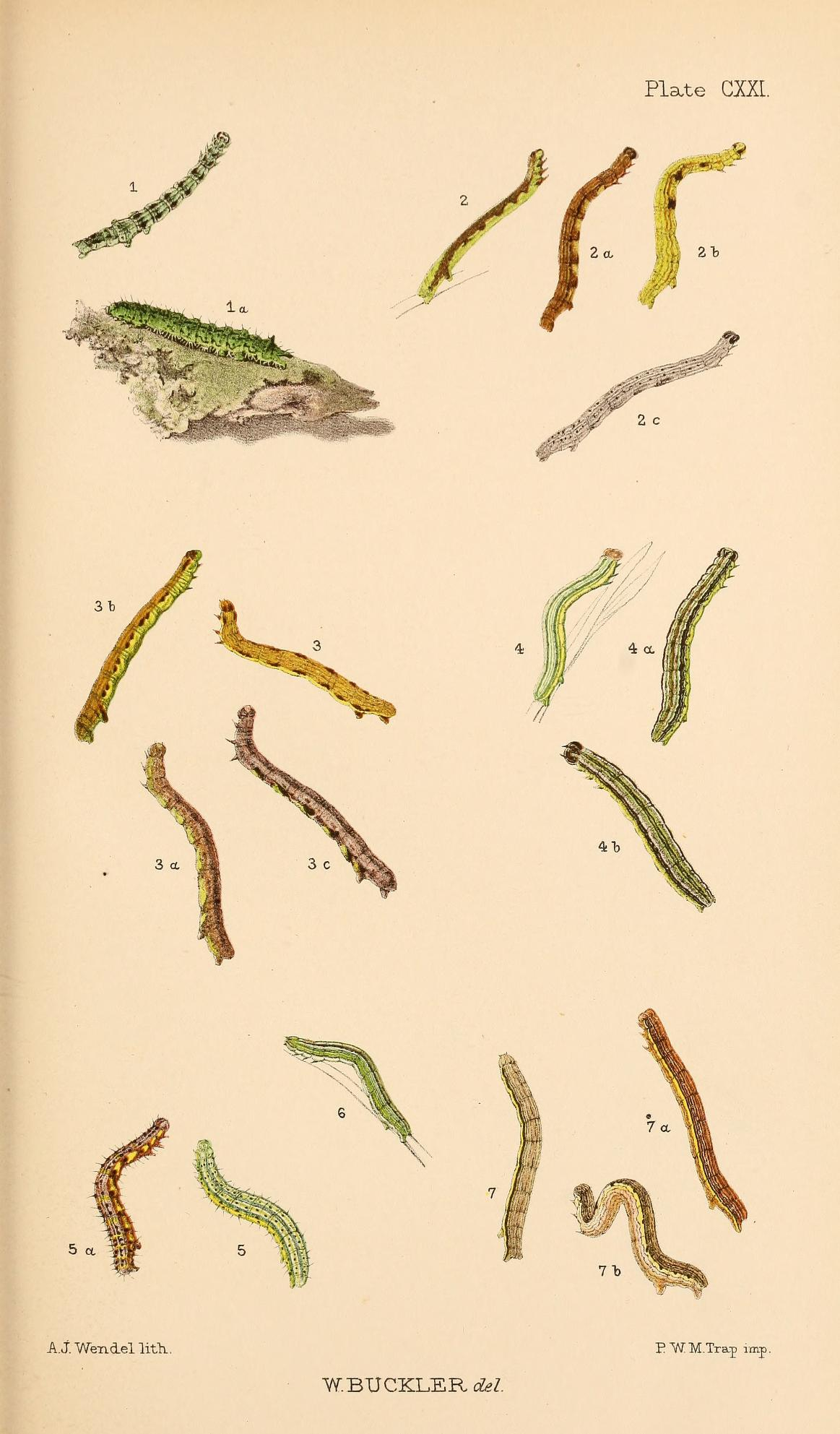
4,4a,4b larvae in various stages

== Biology ==
The moth flies from May to September.

The caterpillars feed on coniferous trees such as Scots pine.They are green with pale stripes and thus resemble pine leaves.

The species inhabited prefers coniferous and mixed forests.

== Notes ==
1. The flight season refers to the Belgium and the Netherlands. This may vary in other parts of the range.#
