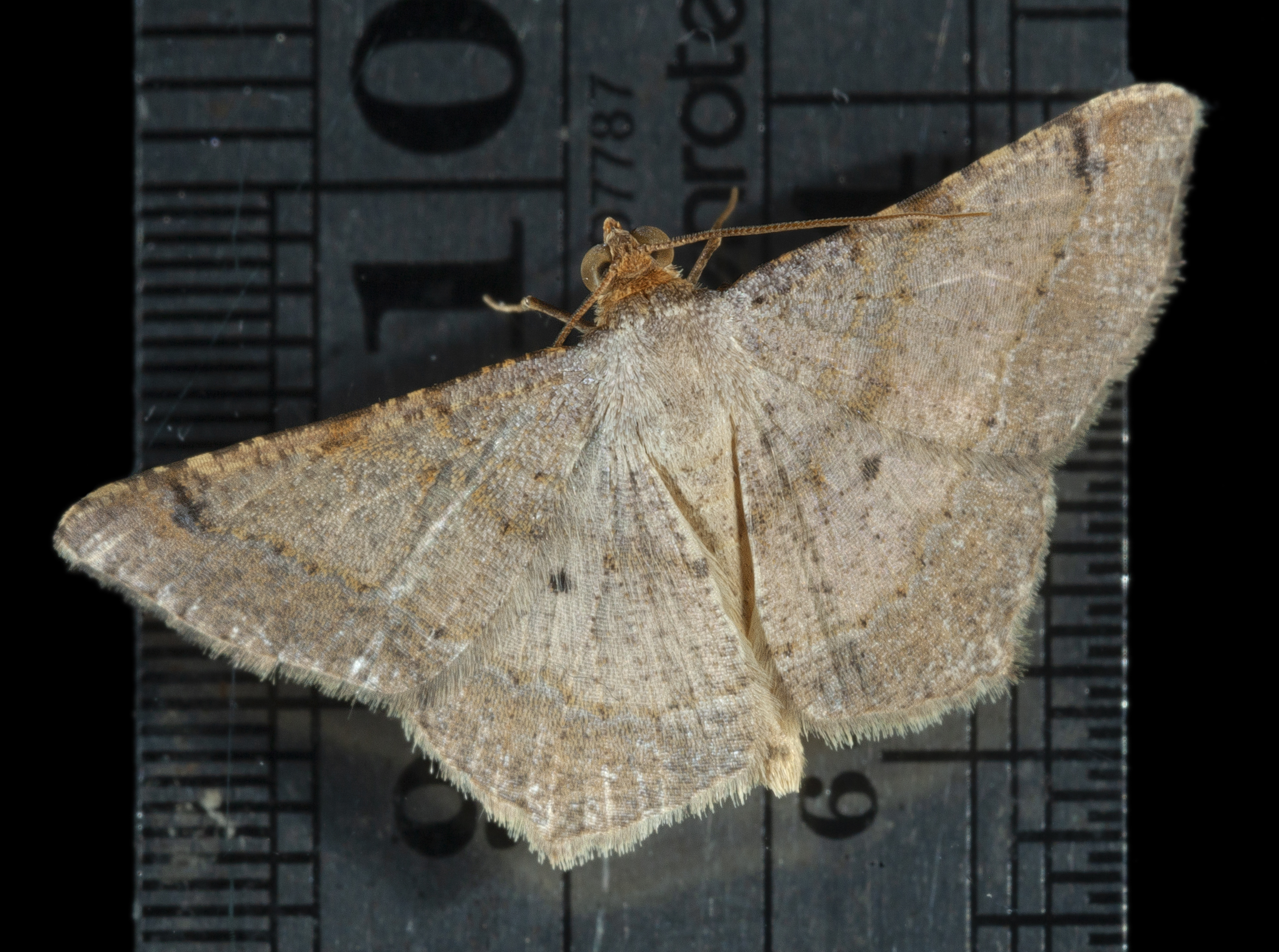

Scientific classification
- Kingdom: Animalia
- Phylum: Arthropoda
- Class: Insecta
- Order: Lepidoptera
- Family: Geometridae
- Genus: Macaria
- Species: M. abydata

Binomial name
- Macaria abydata Guenée, [1858]

Synonyms
- Macaria acidaliata Walker, 1861; Macaria adrasata Snellen, 1874; Macaria confusaria Walker, 1861; Macaria diffusata Guenée, [1858]; Acidalia lataria Walker, 1861; Semiothisa ochrata Warren, 1900; Macaria santaremaria Walker, 1861; Chiasmia vagabunda Inoue, 1986; Psamatodes abydata; Macaria puntolineata (Packard, 1873); Semiothisa simulata

= Macaria abydata =

Species of moth

Macaria abydata, commonly known as the dot-lined angle, is a moth of the family Geometridae. It is native from northern Argentina to the Caribbean and southern United States (southern states from Arizona to Florida, regularly wandering north to Colorado, Kentucky and other more northern states). It has been introduced to the Pacific and has spread rapidly since. The first introduction occurred in Hawaii in 1970 (recorded from all the main islands in 1984). Further spread occurred as follows:

- 1975: Yap, central Micronesia
- 1976: Bonin Islands (Chichi-jima, Haha-jima)
- 1977: Saipan, central Micronesia (1985)
- 1980: Okinawa Island
- 1983: Taiwan
- 1985: Guam, central Micronesia (1985) Sulawesi (1986)
- 1986: Tonga (1985), Fiji (1985), Miyako Islands (Miyako-jima), Luzon, the Philippines (1985)
- 1987: New Caledonia (1985), Sabah, Malaysia
- 1988: western Samoa (1985)
- 1992: Hong Kong

The wingspan is 22–27 mm (0.87–1.06 in).

The phrase "dot-lined" comes from the evidence of small dots along the postmedial and sometimes median line of both forewing and hindwing(anterior of the marginal band).

Recorded host plants for larvae in its natural range are Vachellia farnesiana, Cassia, Sesbania, Parkinsonia aculeata and Glycine max. Larvae have been observed on Acacia koa and introduced Lysiloma latisiliquum and Litchi chinensis in Hawaii. In the Indo-Australian tropics it has been reared from Leucaena and Mimosa diplotricha.
