= List of Lepidoptera of Indiana =

This is a list of butterflies and moths—species of the order Lepidoptera—found in the U.S. state of Indiana.

== Butterflies ==
=== Papilionidae ===
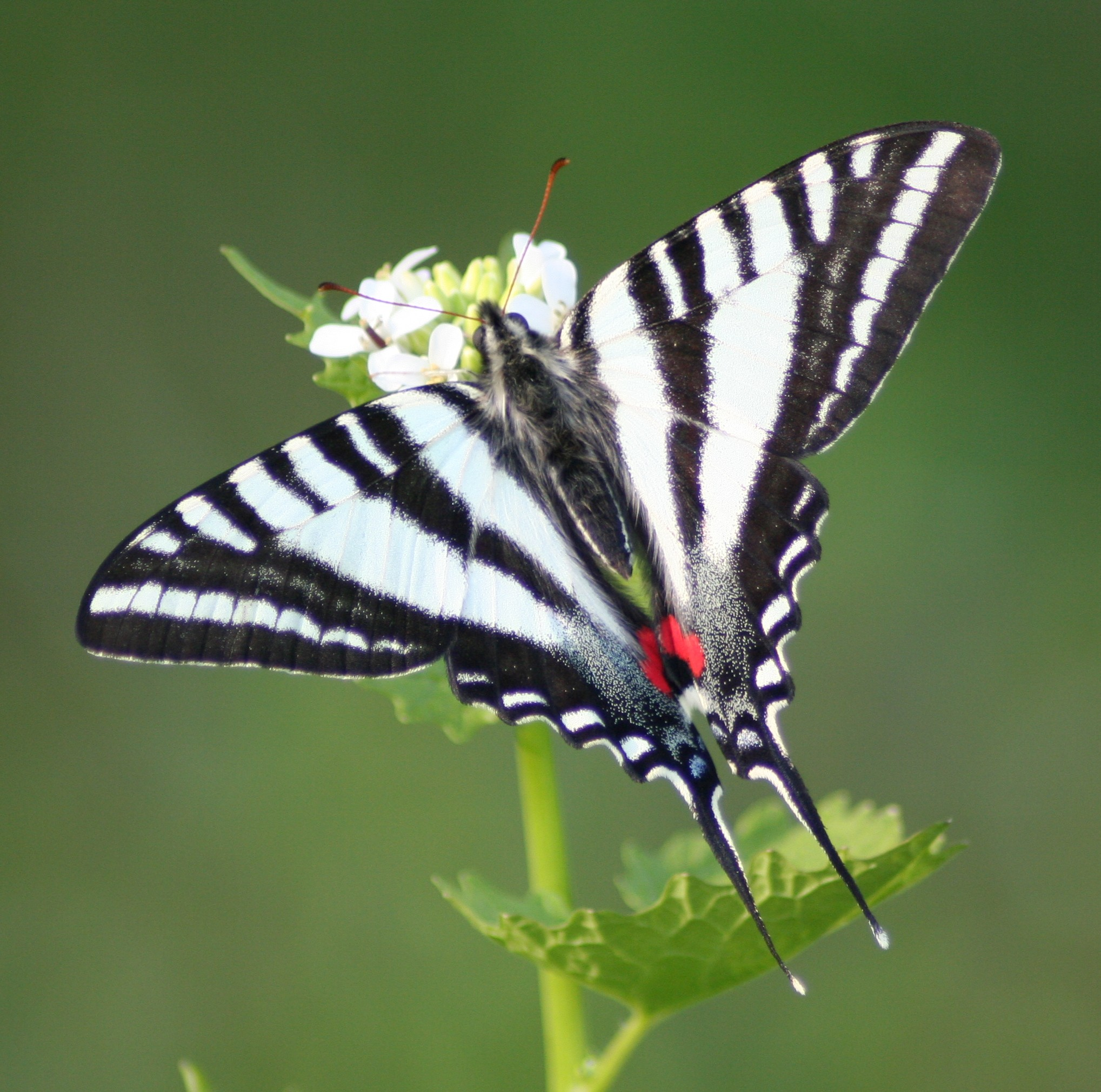
Zebra swallowtail, Eurytides marcellus

- Pipevine swallowtail, Battus philenor
- Zebra swallowtail, Eurytides marcellus
- Black swallowtail, Papilio polyxenes
- Giant swallowtail, Papilio cresphontes
- Eastern tiger swallowtail, Papilio glaucus
- Spicebush swallowtail, Papilio troilus

=== Pieridae ===
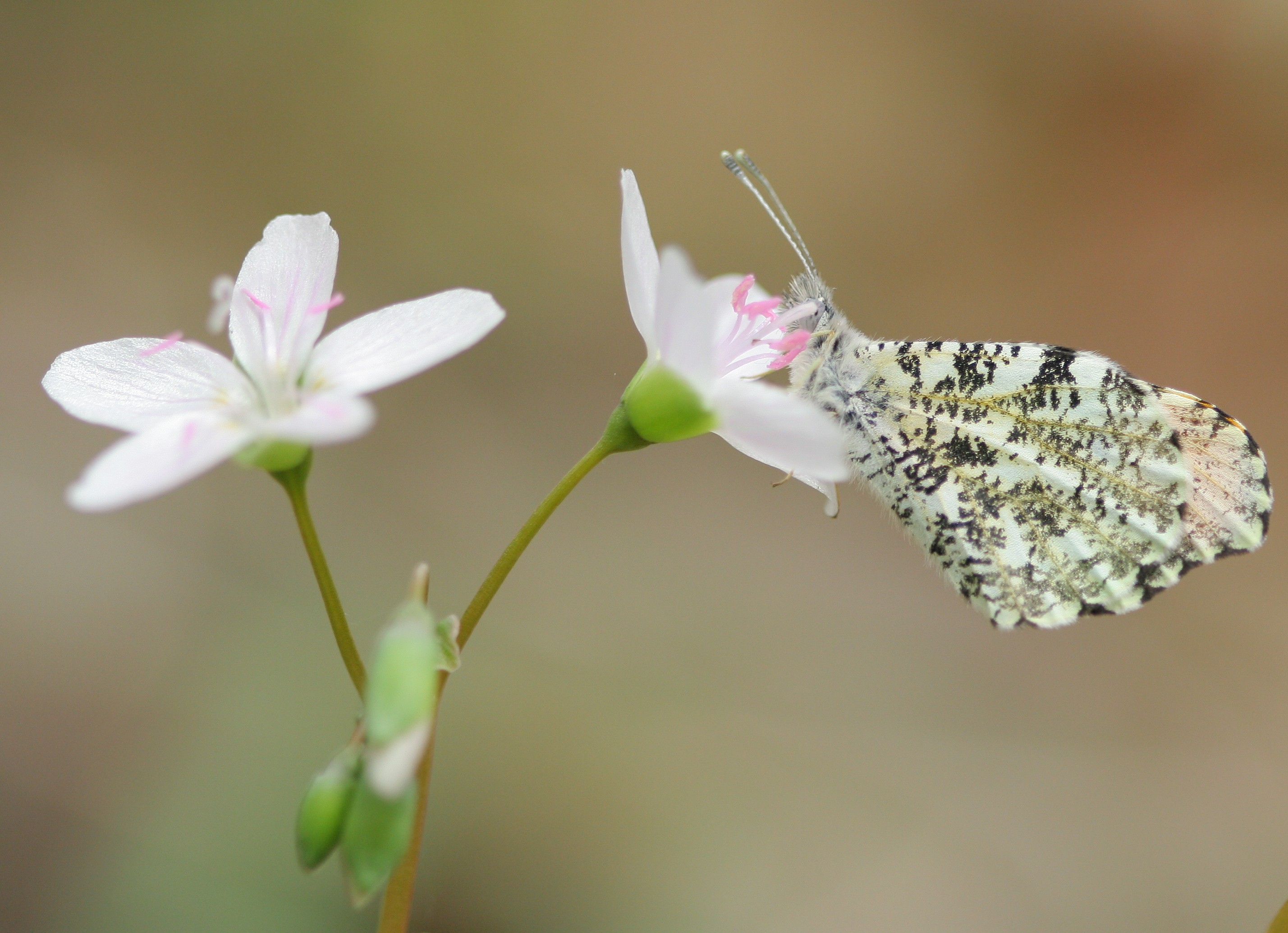
Falcate orangetip, Anthocharis midea

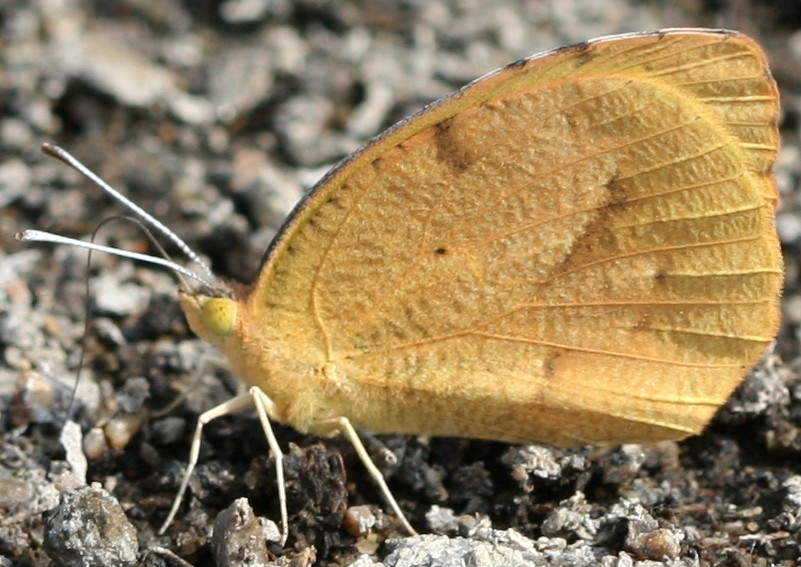
Sleepy orange, Eurema nicippe

==== Pierinae ====
- Checkered white, Pontia protodice
- Mustard white, Pieris napi
- West Virginia white, Pieris virginiensis
- Cabbage white, Pieris rapae
- Olympia marble, Euchloe olympia
- Falcate orangetip, Anthocharis midea

==== Coliadinae ====
- Clouded sulphur, Colias philodice
- Orange sulphur, Colias eurytheme
- Southern dogface, Zerene cesonia
- Cloudless sulphur, Phoebis sennae
- Little yellow, Eurema lisa
- Sleepy orange, Eurema nicippe
- Dainty sulphur, Nathalis iole

=== Lycaenidae ===
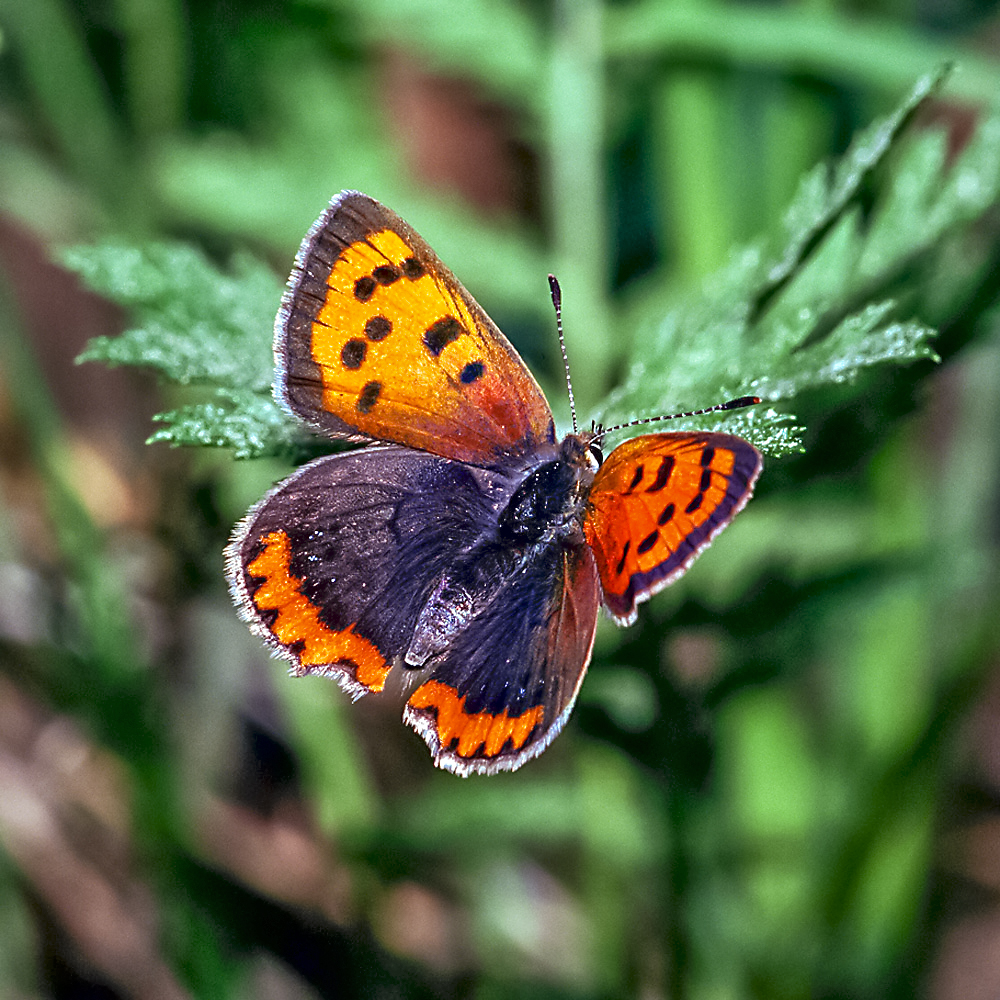
American copper, Lycaena phlaeas

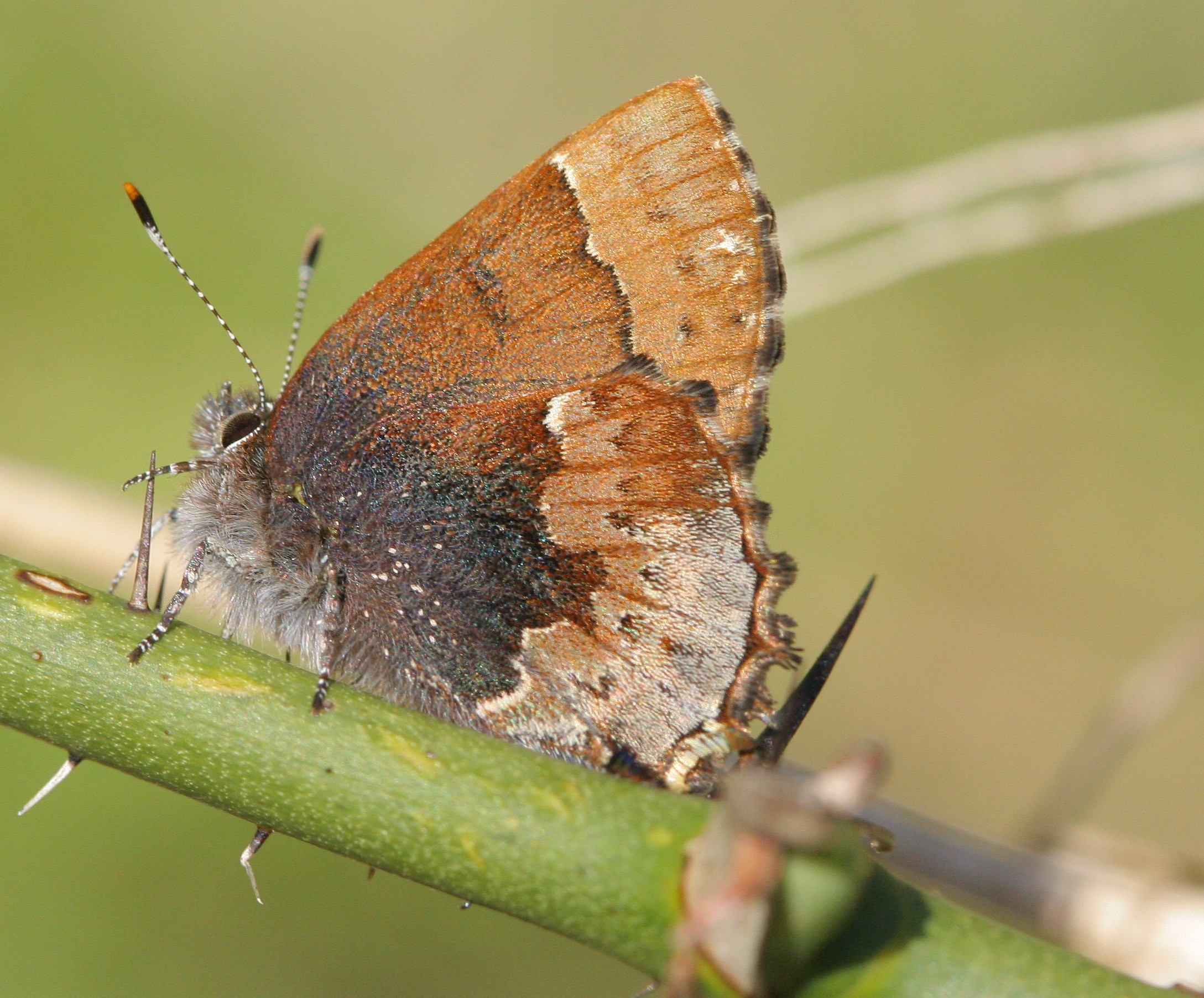
Henry's elifn, Callophrys henrici

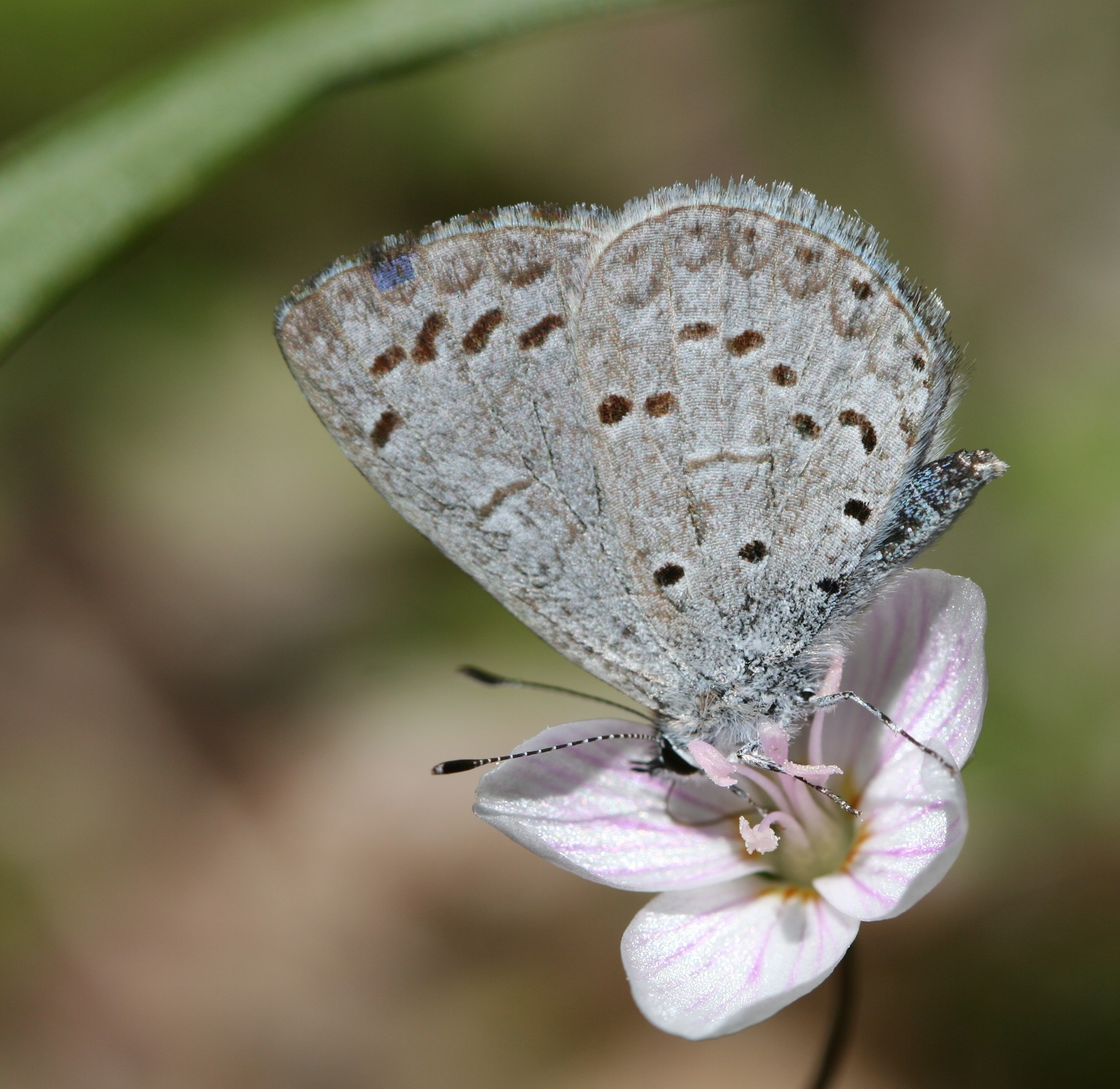
Spring azure, Celastrina ladon

==== Miletinae ====
- Harvester, Feniseca tarquinius

==== Lycaeninae ====
- American copper, Lycaena phlaeas
- Bog copper, Lycaena epixanthe
- Bronze copper, Lycaena hyllus
- Dorcas copper, Lycaena dorcas
- Purplish copper, Lycaena helloides

==== Theclinae ====
- Coral hairstreak, Satyrium titus
- Acadian hairstreak, Satyrium acadica
- Edward's hairstreak, Satyrium edwardsii
- Banded hairstreak, Satyrium calanus
- Hickory hairstreak, Satyrium caryaevorum
- Striped hairstreak, Satyrium liparops
- "Northern" oak hairstreak, Satyrium favonius ontario
- Frosted elfin, Callophrys irus
- Henry's elfin, Callophrys henrici
- Eastern pine elfin, Callophrys niphon
- "Olive" juniper hairstreak, Callophrys gryneus gryneus
- White M hairstreak, Parrhasius m-album
- Gray hairstreak, Strymon melinus
- Red-banded hairstreak, Calycopis cecrops

==== Polyommatinae ====
- Eastern tailed-blue, Everes comyntas
- Spring azure, Celastrina ladon
- Summer azure, Celastrina neglecta
- Appalachian azure, Celastrina neglectamajor
- Dusky azure, Celastrina nigra
- Silvery blue, Glaucopsyche lygdamus

=== Riodinidae ===
- Northern metalmark, Calephelis borealis
- Swamp metalmark, Calephelis muticum

=== Nymphalidae ===
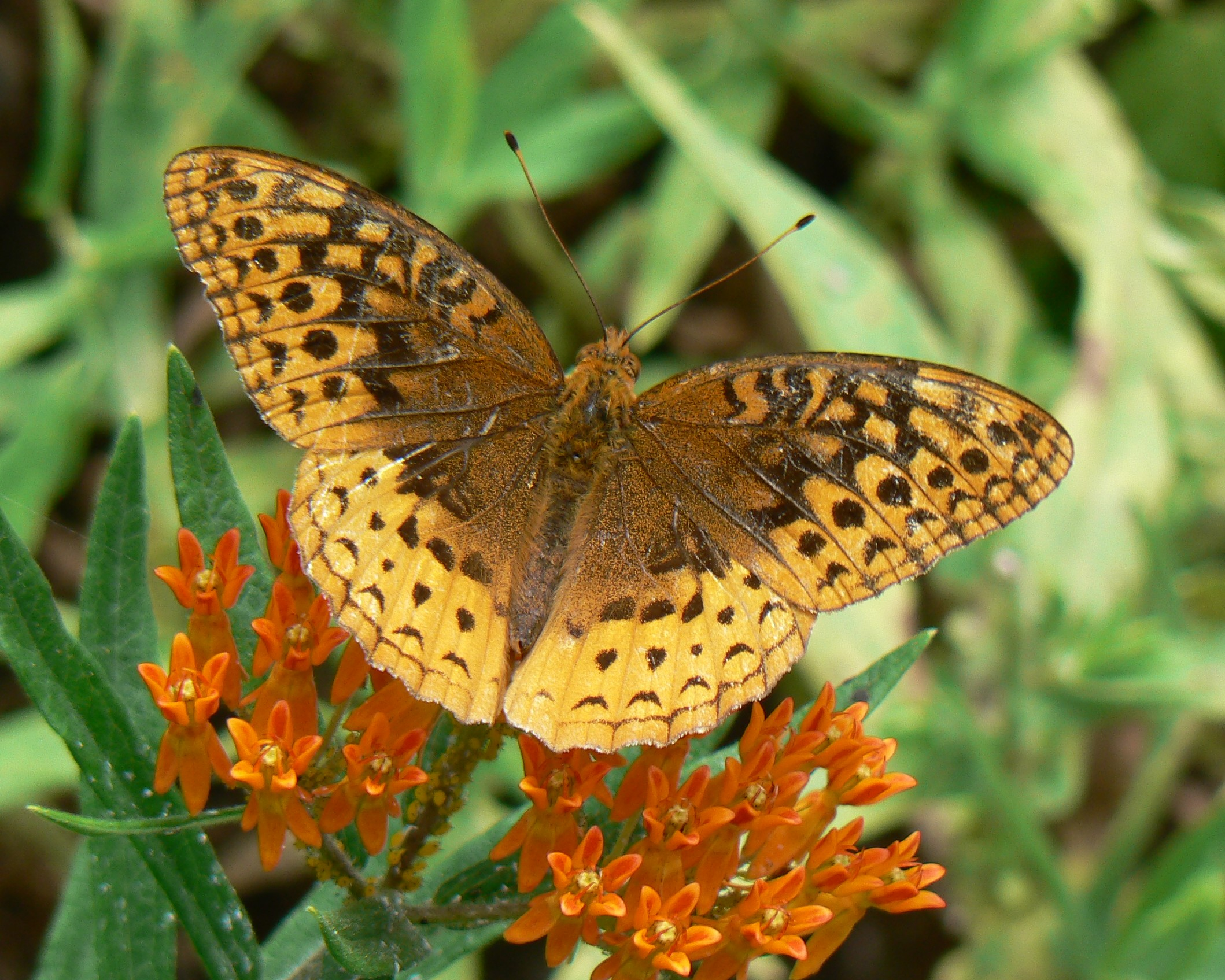
Great spangled fritillary, Speyeria cybele

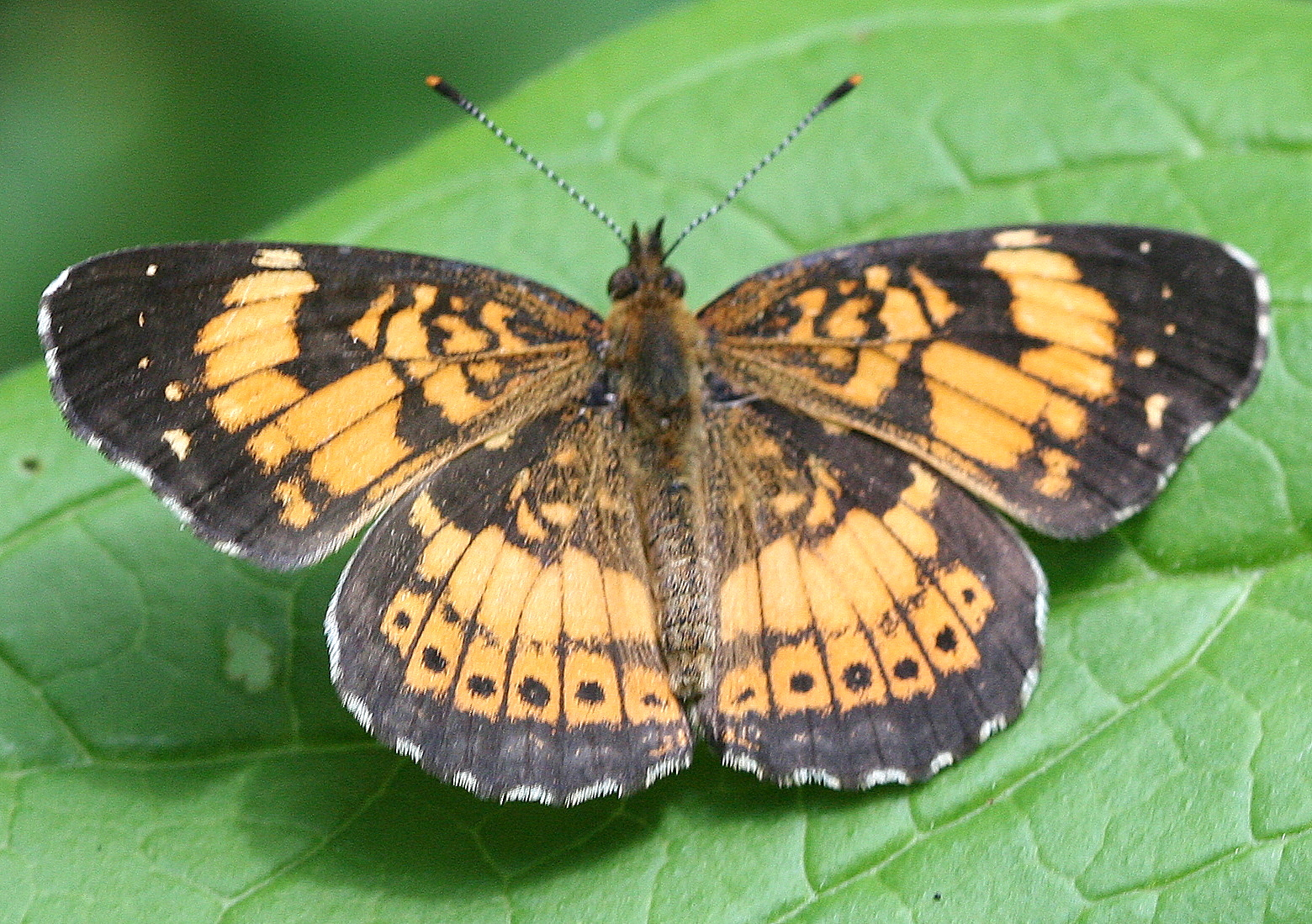
Silvery checkerspot, Chlosyne nycteis

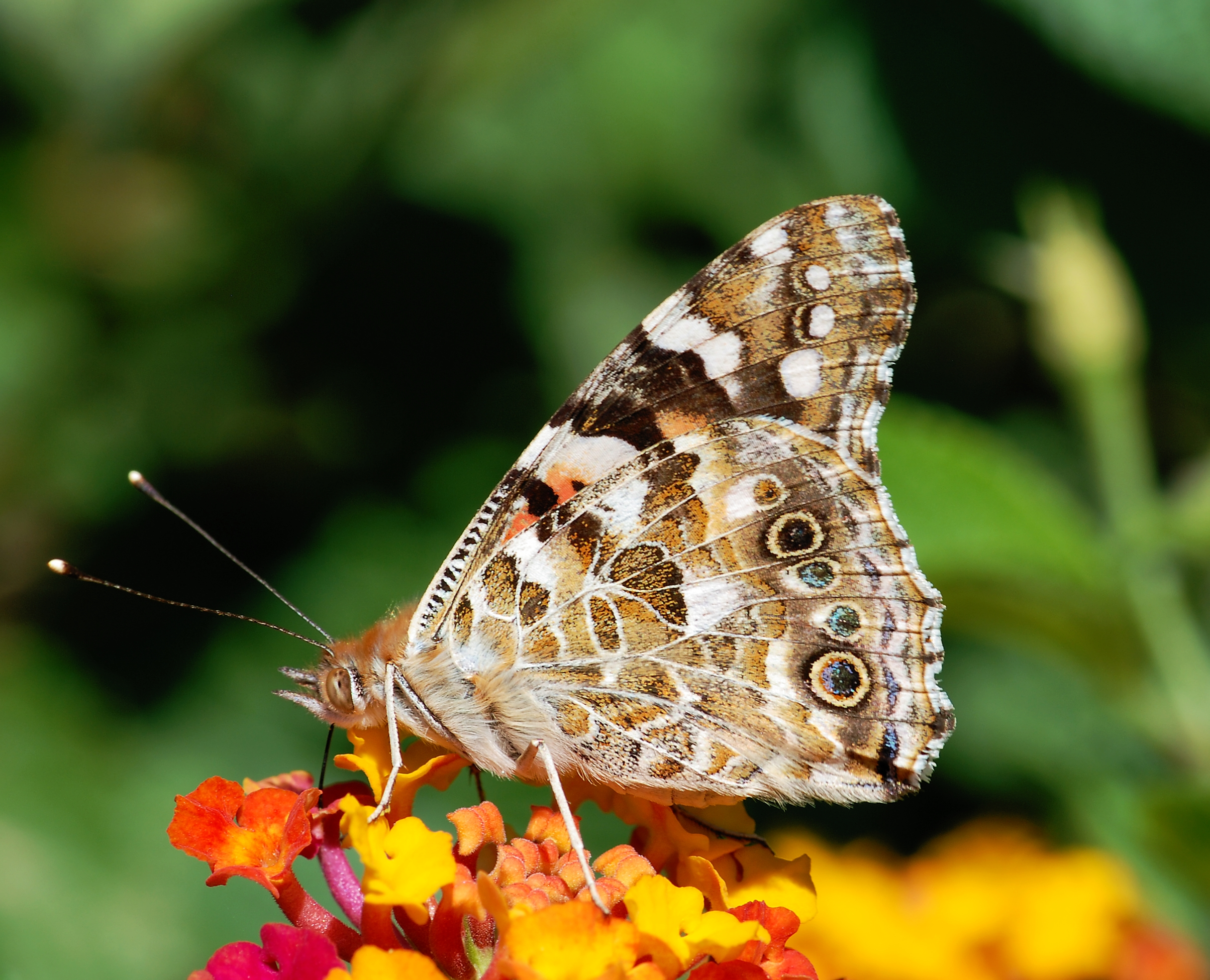
Painted lady, Vanessa cardui

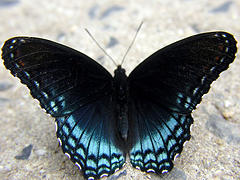
Red-spotted purple, Limenitis arthemis astyanax

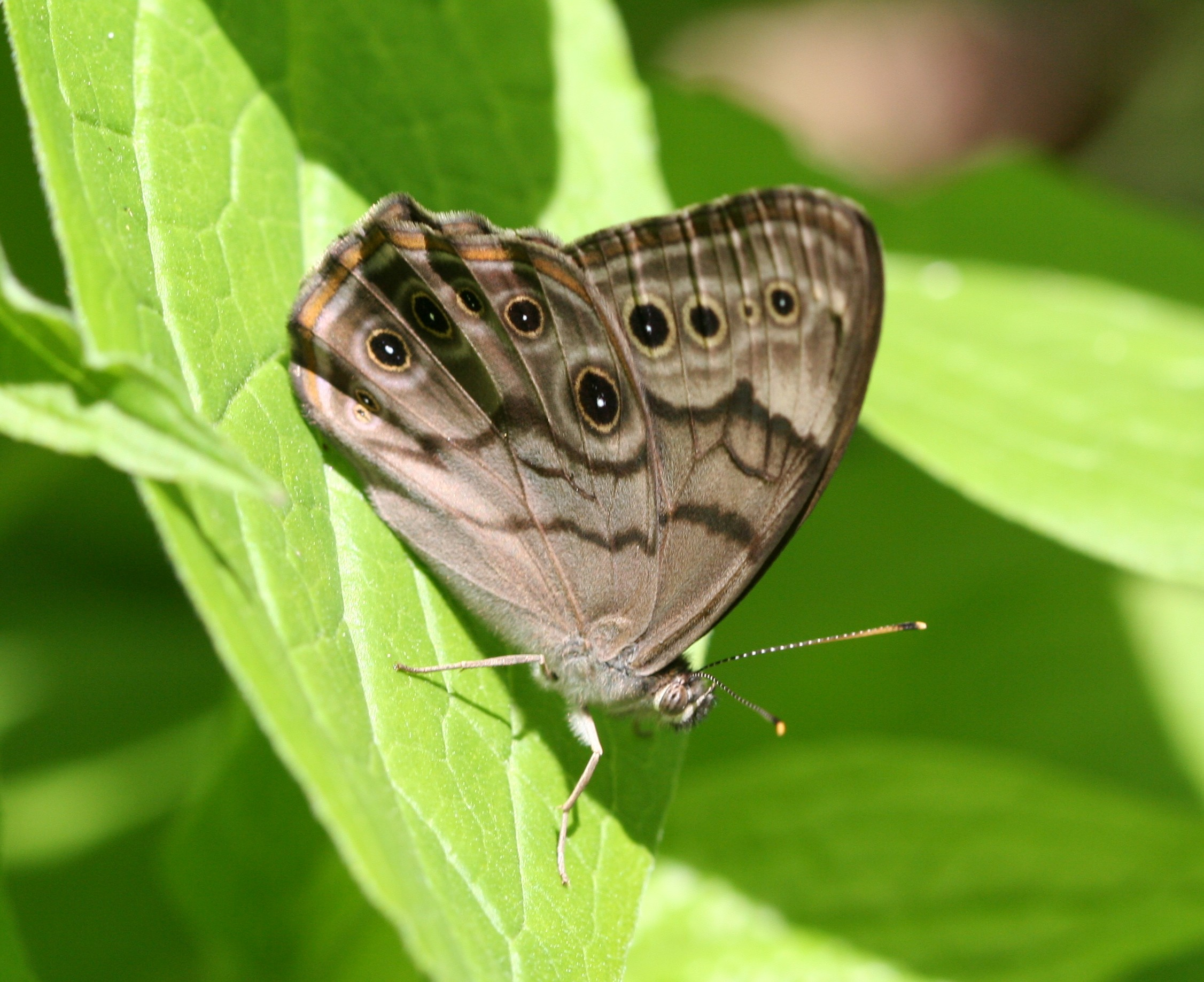
Northern pearly-eye, Enodia anthedon

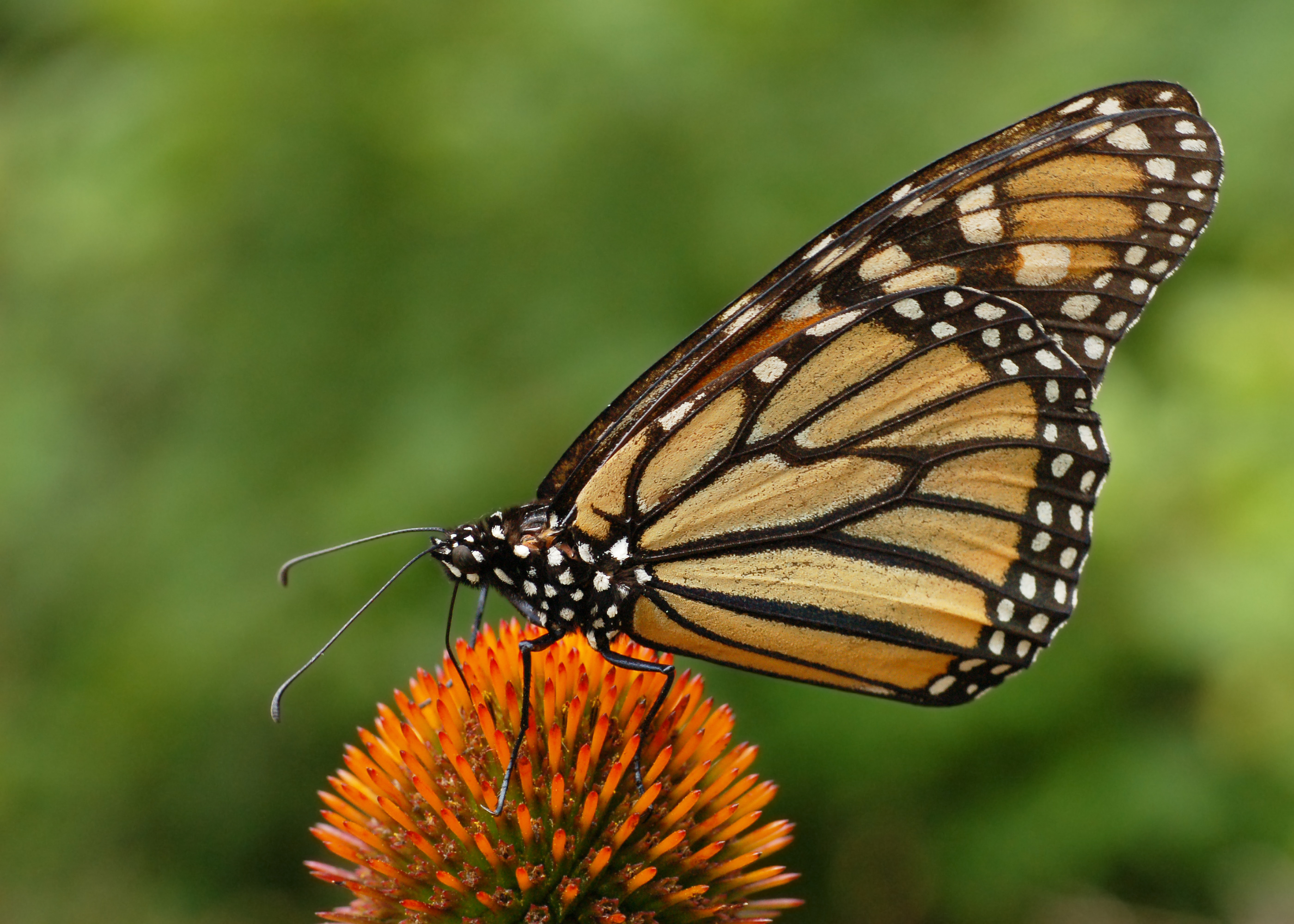
Monarch, Danaus plexippus

==== Libytheinae ====
- American snout, Libytheana carinenta

==== Heliconiinae ====
- Variegated fritillary, Euptoieta claudia
- Great spangled fritillary, Speyeria cybele
- Aphrodite fritillary, Speyeria aphrodite
- Silver-bordered fritillary, Boloria selene
- Meadow fritillary, Boloria bellona

==== Nymphalinae ====
- Gorgone checkerspot, Chlosyne gorgone
- Silvery checkerspot, Chlosyne nycteis
- Harris's checkerspot, Chlosyne harrisii
- Pearl crescent, Phyciodes tharos
- Baltimore checkerspot, Euphydryas phaeton
- Question mark, Polygonia interrogationis
- Eastern comma, Polygonia comma
- Gray comma, Polygonia progne
- Compton tortoiseshell, Nymphalis vaualbum
- Mourning cloak, Nymphalis antiopa
- Milbert's tortoiseshell, Nymphalis milberti
- American lady, Vanessa virginiensis
- Painted lady, Vanessa cardui
- Red admiral, Vanessa atalanta
- Common buckeye, Junonia coenia

==== Limenitidinae ====
- White admiral, Limenitis arthemis
- Red-spotted purple, Limenitis arthemis astyanax
- Viceroy, Limenitis archippus

==== Charaxinae ====
- Goatweed leafwing, Anaea andria

==== Apaturinae ====
- Hackberry emperor, Asterocampa celtis
- Tawny emperor, Asterocampa clyton

==== Satyrinae ====
- Southern pearly-eye, Enodia portlandia
- Northern pearly-eye, Enodia anthedon
- Creole pearly-eye, Enodia creola
- Eyed brown, Satyrodes eurydice
- Appalachian brown, Satyrodes appalachia
- Gemmed satyr, Cyllopsis gemma
- Carolina satyr, Hermeuptychia sosybius
- Mitchell's satyr, Neonympha mitchellii
- Little wood-satyr, Megisto cymela
- Common wood-nymph, Cercyonis pegala

==== Danainae ====
- Monarch, Danaus plexippus

=== Hesperiidae ===
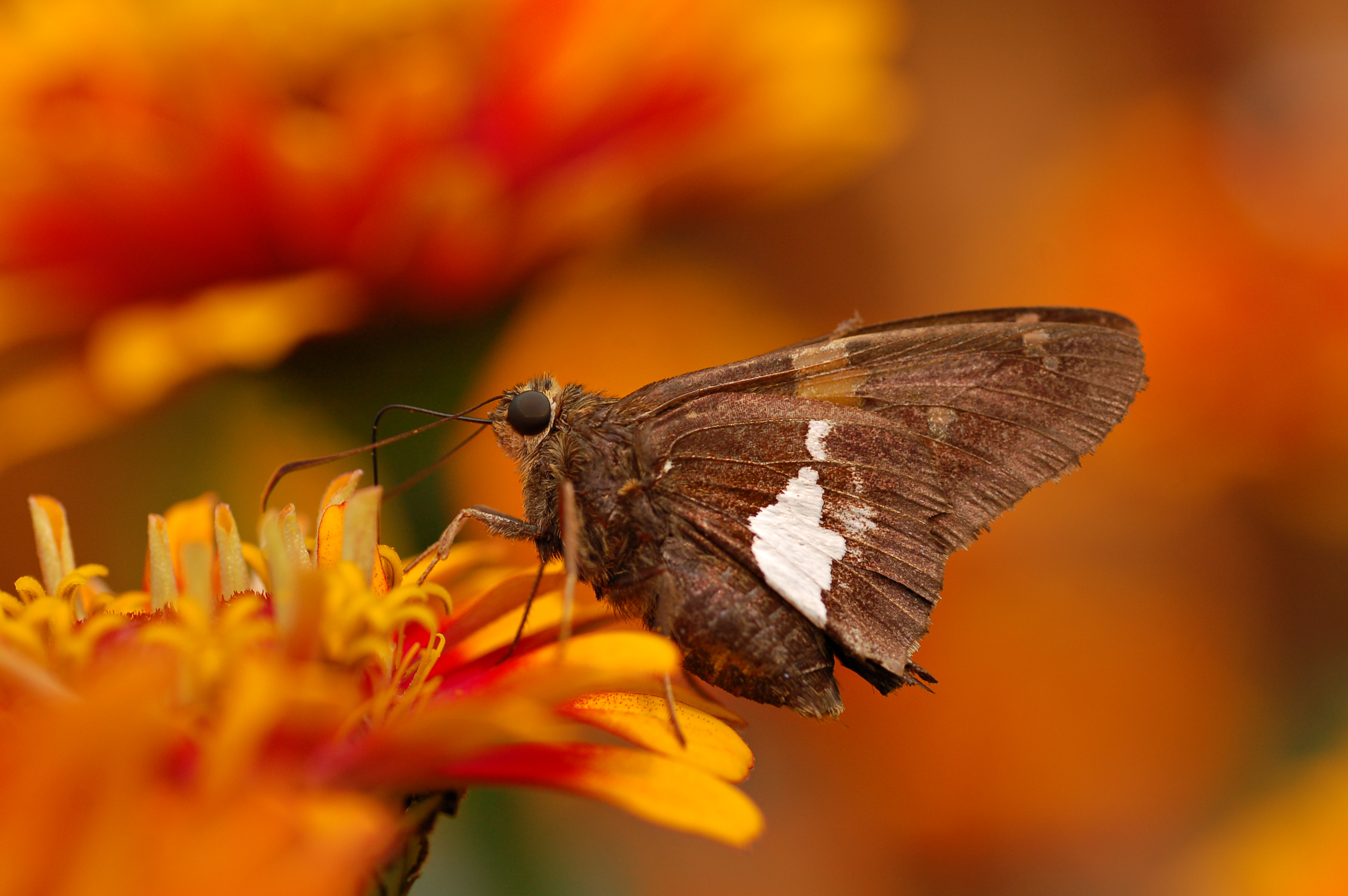
Silver-spotted skipper, Epargyreus clarus

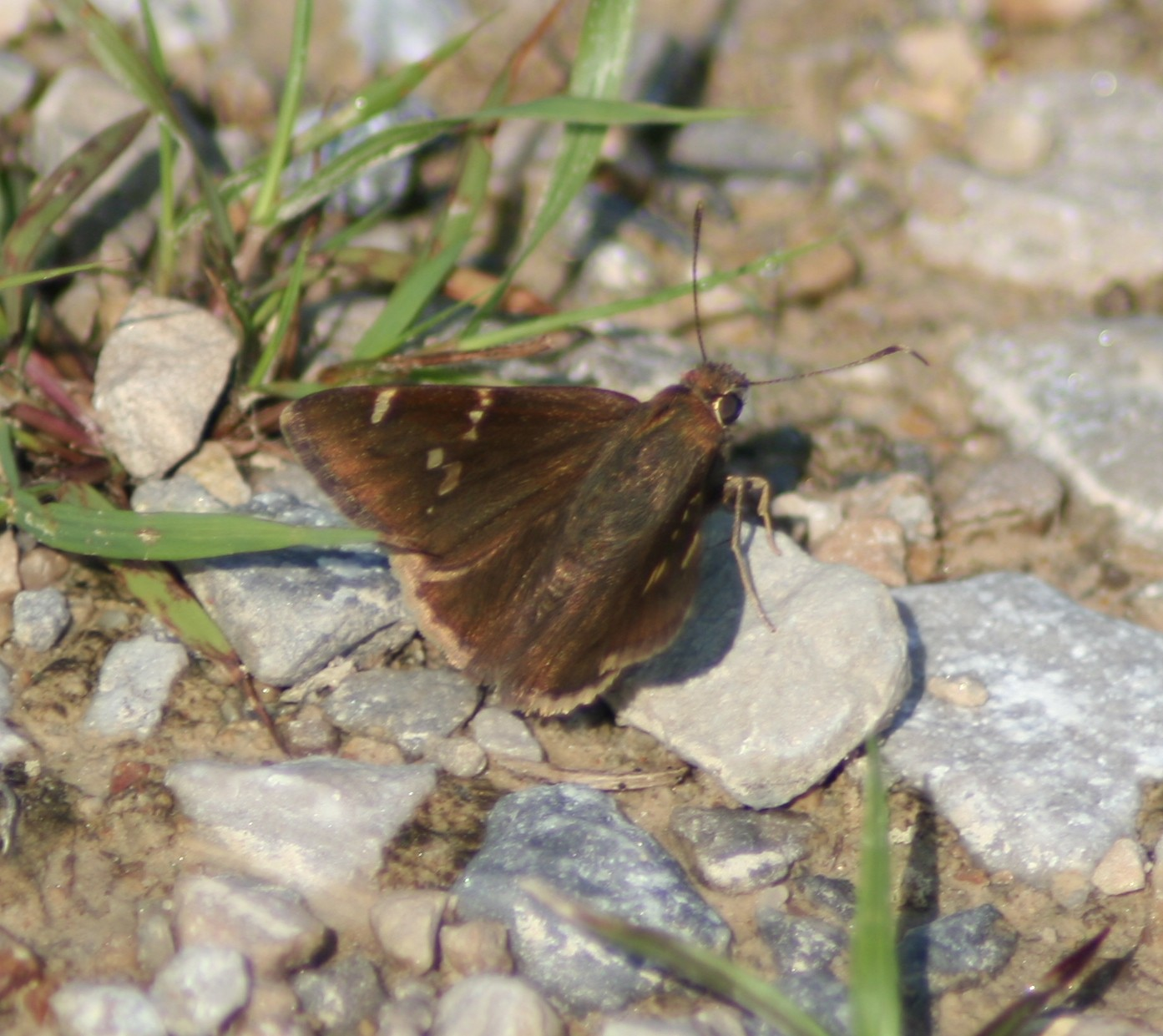
Southern cloudywing, Thorybes bathyllus

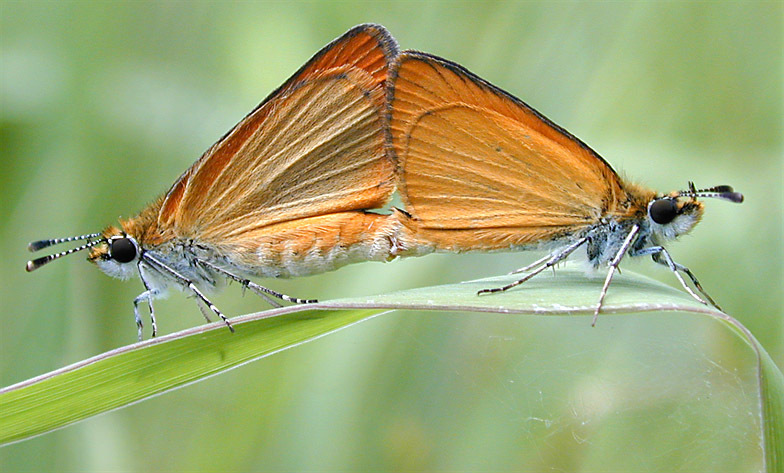
Least skippers mating, Ancyloxypha numitor

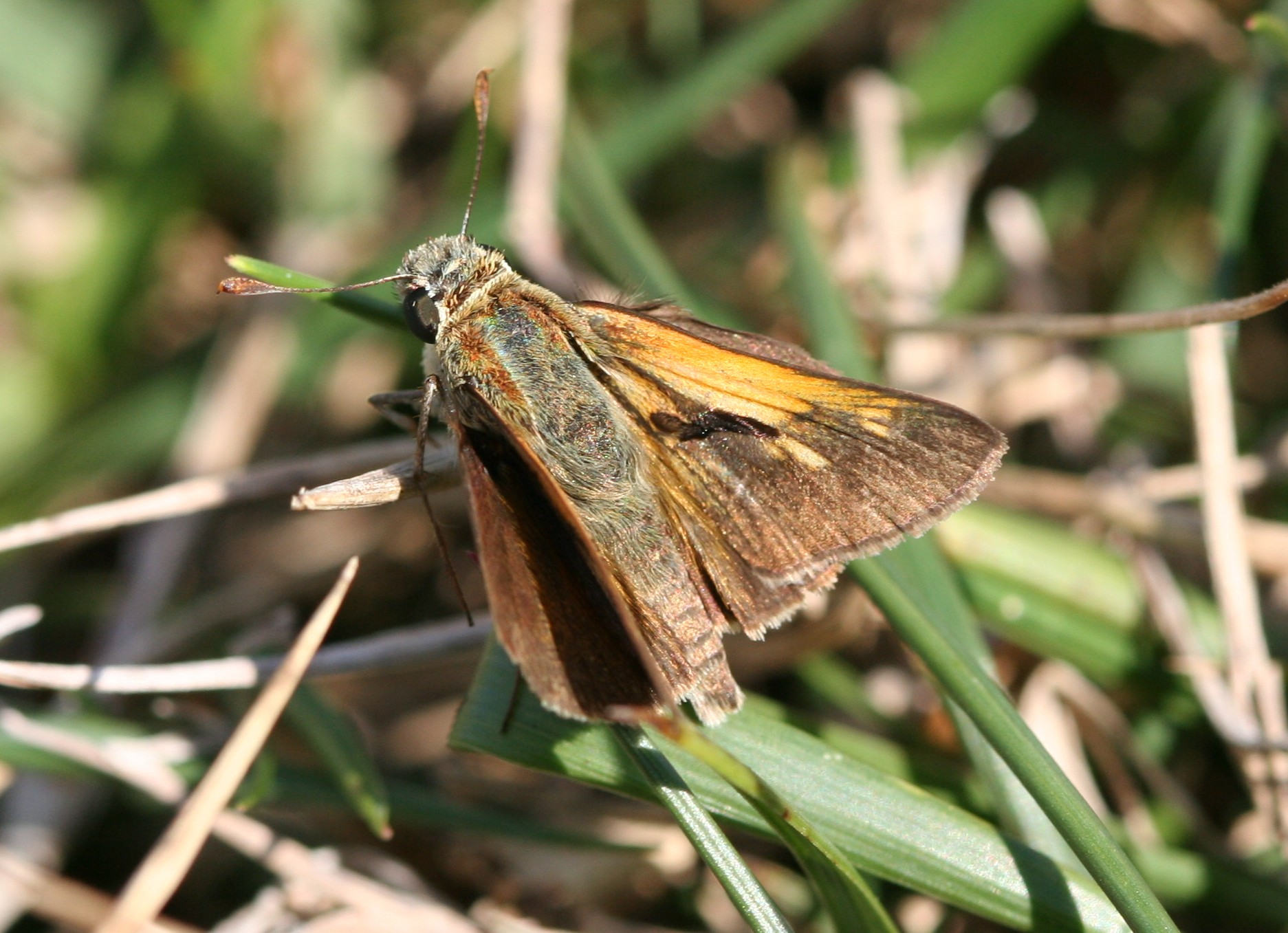
Tawny-edged skipper, Polites themistocles

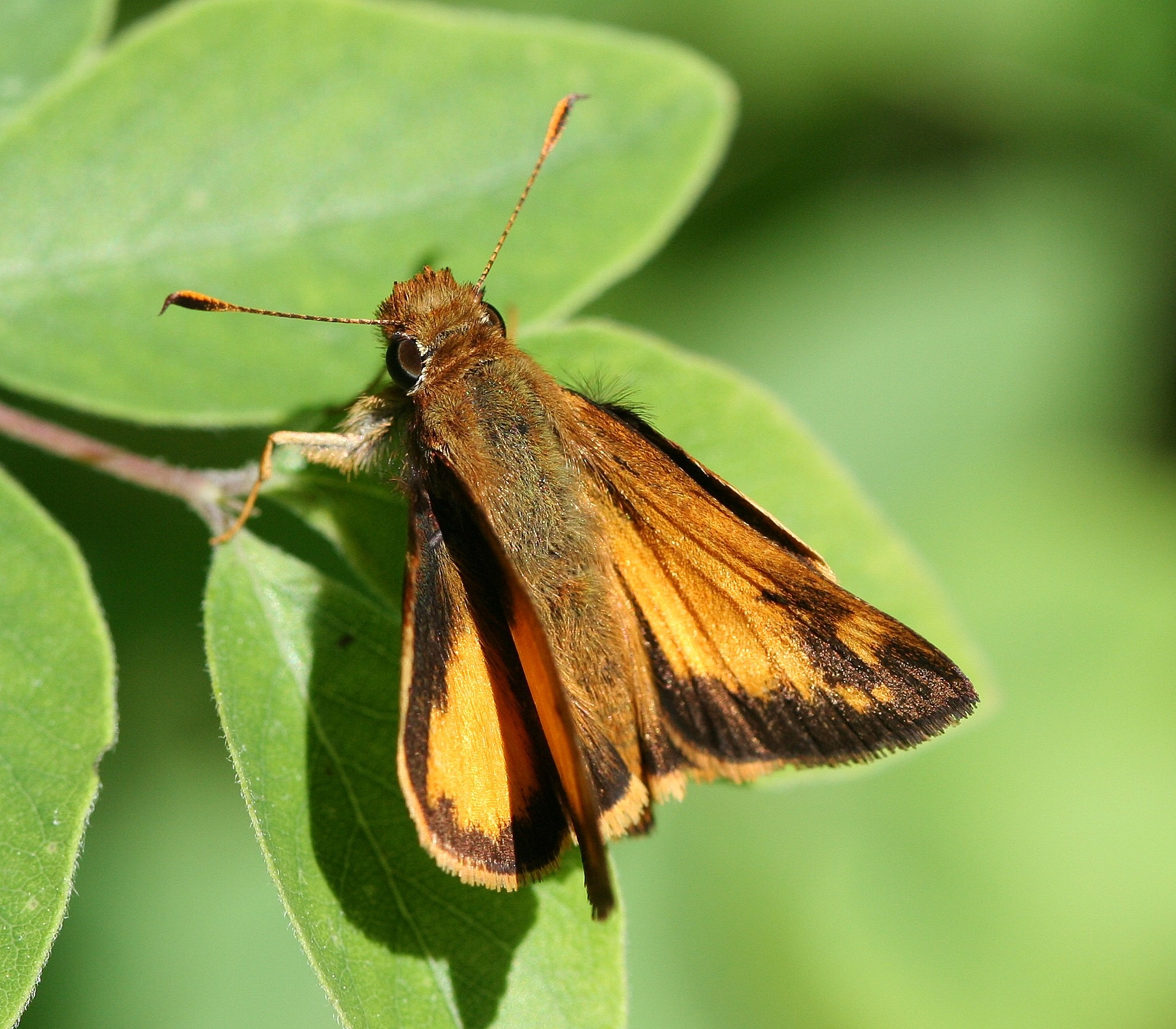
Zabulon skipper, Poanes zabulon

==== Pyrginae ====
- Silver-spotted skipper, Epargyreus clarus
- Golden banded-skipper, Autochton cellus
- Hoary edge, Achalarus lyciades
- Southern cloudywing, Thorybes bathyllus
- Northern cloudywing, Thorybes pylades
- Hayhurst's scallopwing, Staphylus hayhurstii
- Dreamy duskywing, Erynnis icelus
- Sleepy duskywing, Erynnis brizo
- Juvenal's duskywing, Erynnis juvenalis
- Horace's duskywing, Erynnis horatius
- Mottled duskywing, Erynnis martialis
- Columbine duskywing, Erynnis lucilius
- Wild indigo duskywing, Erynnis baptisiae
- Persius duskywing, Erynnis persius
- Common checkered-skipper, Pyrgus communis
- Common sootywing, Pholisora catullus

==== Hesperiinae ====
- Swarthy skipper, Nastra lherminier
- Least skipper, Ancyloxypha numitor
- European skipper, Thymelicus lineola
- Fiery skipper, Hylephila phyleus
- Ottoe skipper, Hesperia ottoe
- Leonard's skipper, Hesperia leonardus
- Cobweb skipper, Hesperia metea
- Indian skipper, Hesperia sassacus
- Peck's skipper, Polites peckius
- Tawny-edged skipper, Polites themistocles
- Crossline skipper, Polites origenes
- Long dash, Polites mystic
- Northern broken dash, Wallengrenia egeremet
- Little glassywing, Pompeius verna
- Sachem, Atalopedes campestris
- Delaware skipper, Anatrytone logan
- Byssus skipper, Problema byssus
- Mulberry wing, Poanes massasoit
- Hobomok skipper, Poanes hobomok
- Zabulon skipper, Poanes zabulon
- Yehl skipper, Poanes yehl
- Broad-winged skipper, Poanes viator
- Dion skipper, Euphyes dion
- Duke's skipper, Euphyes dukesi
- Black dash, Euphyes conspicua
- Two-spotted skipper, Euphyes bimacula
- Dun skipper, Euphyes vestris
- Dusted skipper, Atrytonopsis hianna
- Pepper and salt skipper, Amblyscirtes hegon
- Lace-winged roadside-skipper, Amblyscirtes aesculapius
- Common roadside-skipper, Amblyscirtes vialis
- Bell's roadside-skipper, Amblyscirtes belli

== Moths ==
=== Saturniidae ===
==== Saturniinae ====
- Luna moth, Actias luna
- Polyphemus moth, Antheraea polyphemus
- Cecropia moth, Hyalophora cecropia
- Promethia moth, Callosamia promethea
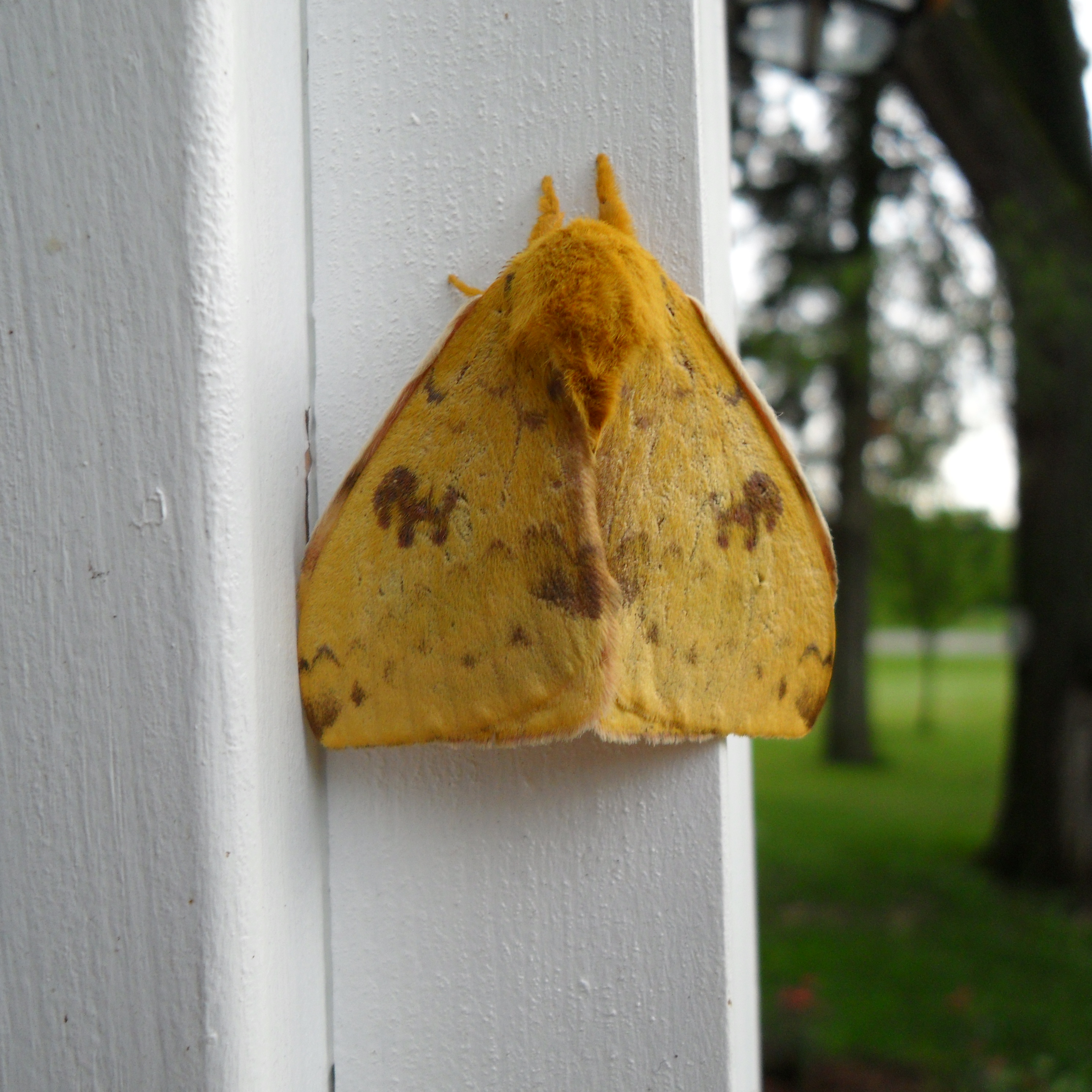
  Io moth, Automeris io - male
- Tulip tree moth, Callosamia angulifera

==== Hemileucinae ====
- Io moth, Automeris io
- Eastern buck moth, Hemileuca maia

==== Ceratocampinae ====
- Imperial moth, Eacles imperialis
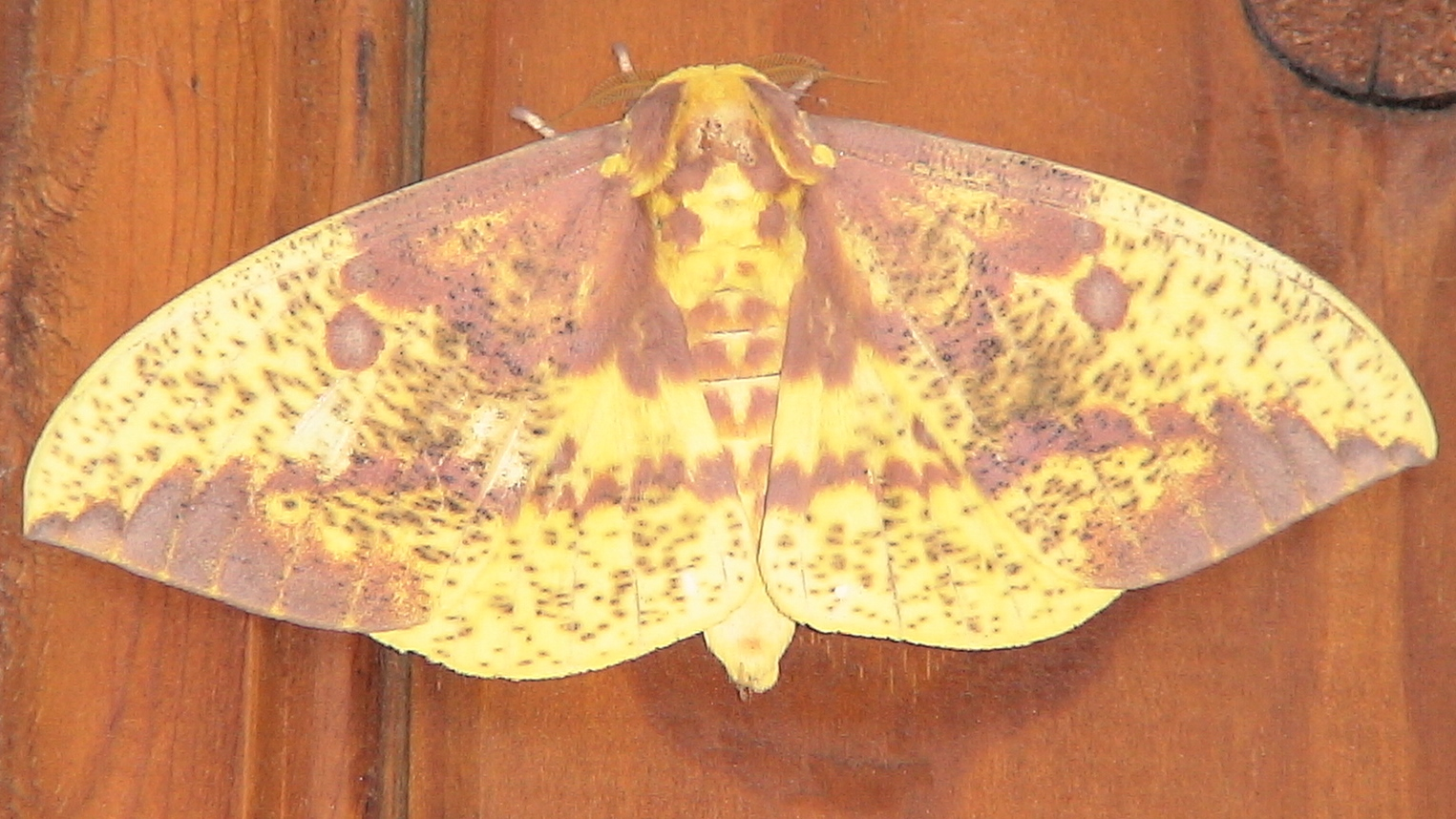
  Eacles imperialis
- Regal moth, Citheronia regalis
- Pine devil, Citheronia sepulcralis
- Rosy maple moth, Dryocampa rubicunda
- Honey locust moth, Sphingicampa bicolor

=== Sphingidae ===
==== Macroglossinae ====
- Lettered sphinx, Deidamia inscriptum
- Pandora sphinx, Eumorpha pandorus
- Nessus sphinx, Amphion floridensis
- Abbott's sphinx, Sphecodina abbottii
- Virginia creeper sphinx, Darapsa myron
- Azalea sphinx, Darapsa choerilus
- Hummingbird sphinx, Hemaris thysbe

==== Sphinginae ====
- Hermit sphinx, Lintneria eremitus
- Carolina sphinx, Manduca sexta
- Elm sphinx, Ceratomia amyntor
- Waved sphinx, Ceratomia undulosa

==== Smerinthinae ====
- Twin spotted sphinx, Smerinthus jamaicensis
- Small eyed sphinx, Paonias myops
- Walnut sphinx, Amorpha juglandis

=== Noctuidae ===
==== Noctuinae ====
- Golden borer, Papaipema cerina
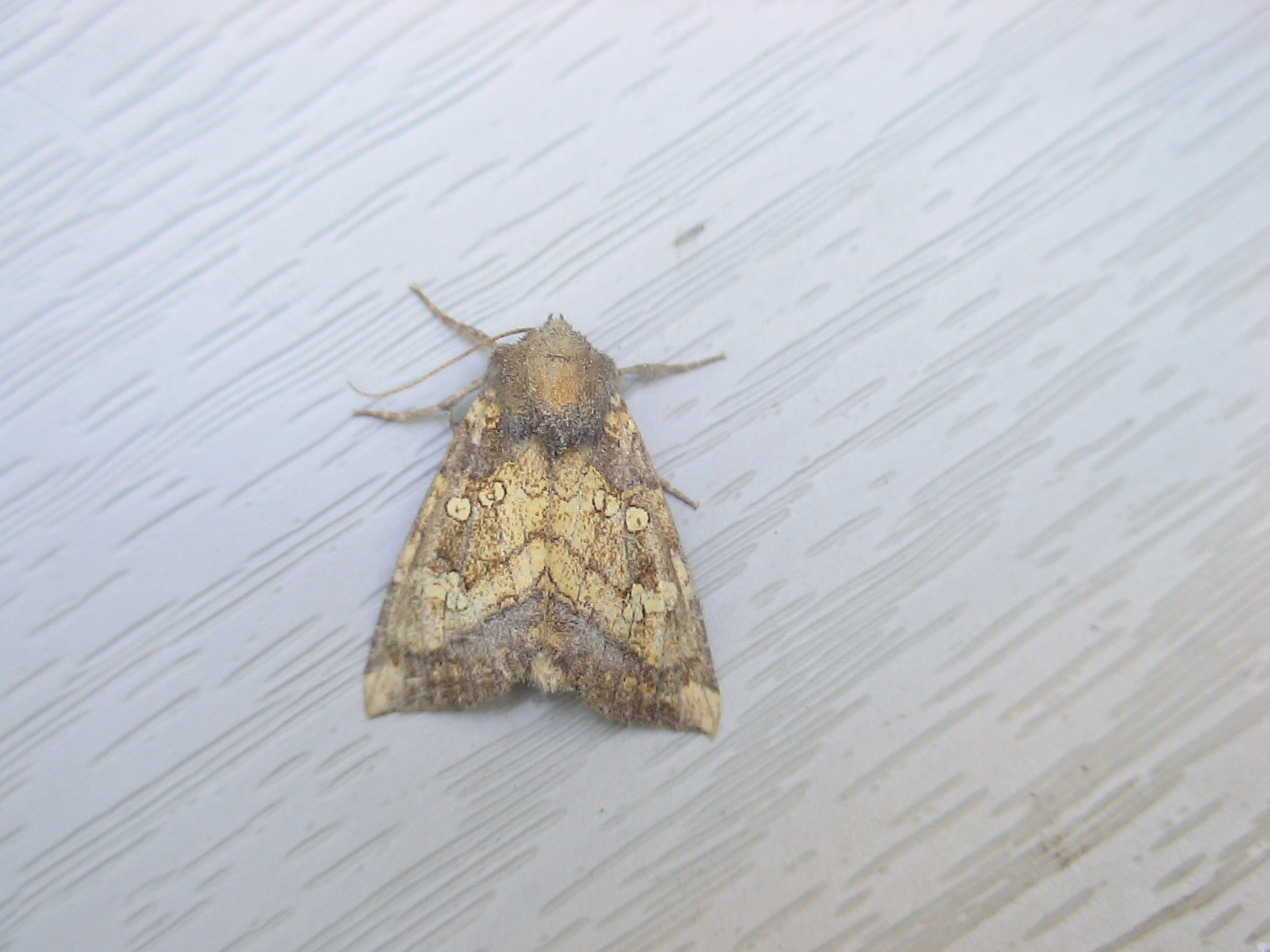
  A live Papaipema cataphracta
- Stalk borer, Papaipema nebris
- Burdock borer, Papaipema cataphracta
- Northern burdock borer, Papaipema arctivorens
- Aster borer, Papaipema impecuniosa
- Ash tip borer, Papaipema furcata
- Large yellow underwing, Noctua pronuba

==== Plusiinae ====
- Connected looper, Plusia contexta
- Unspotted looper, Allagrapha aerea
- Golden looper, Argyrogramma verruca
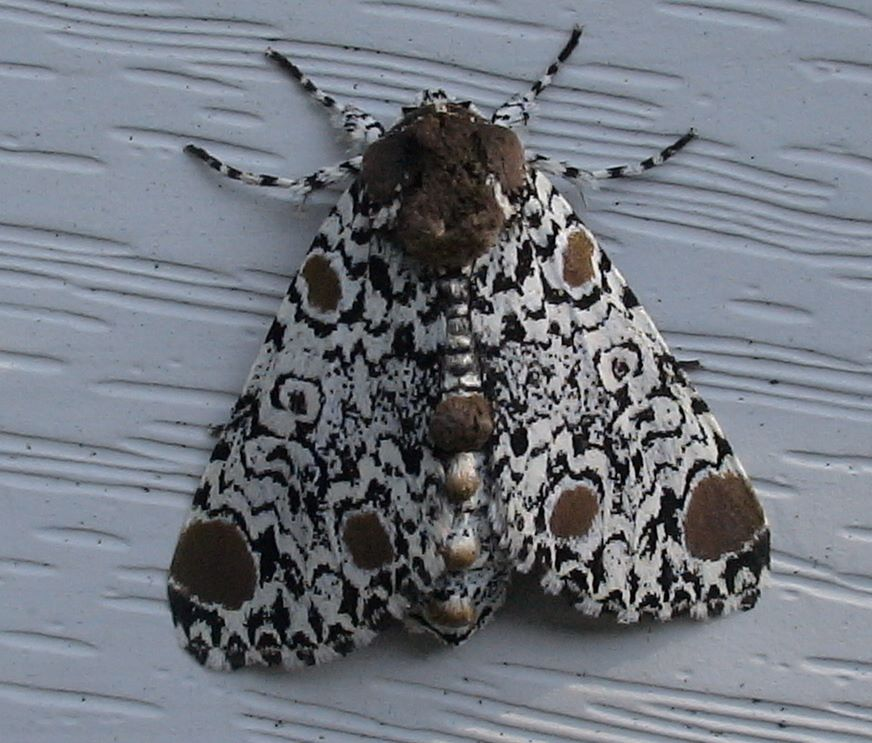
  Harris's three spot moth
- Spectacled nettle moth, Abrostola urentis

==== Acronictinae ====
- Harris's three spot, Harrisimemna trisignata
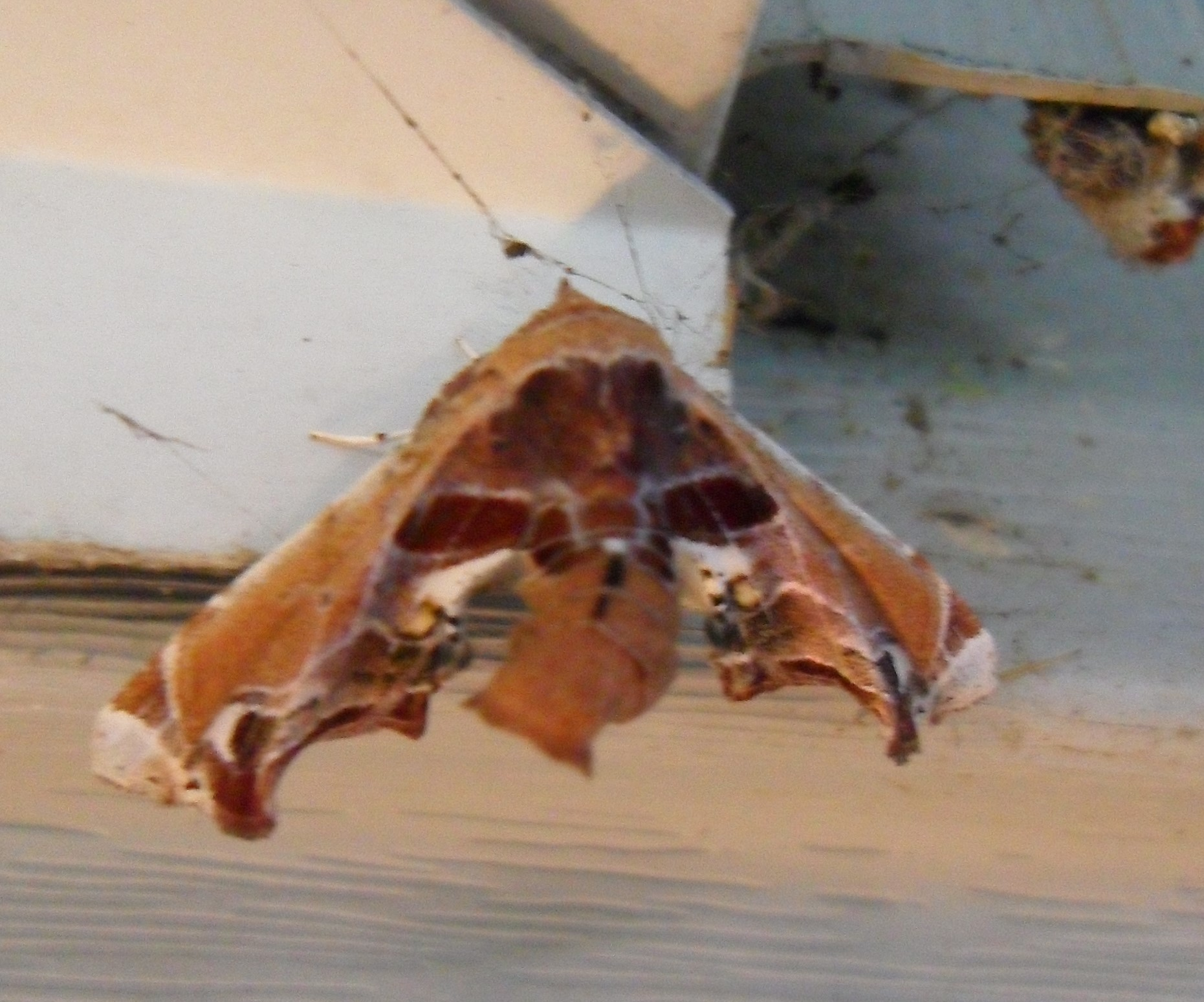
  Beautiful eutelia

=== Euteliidae ===
==== Euteliinae ====
- Beautiful eutelia, Eutelia pulcherrima
- Eyed paectes, Paectes oculatrix
- Dark marathyssa, Marathyssa basalis
- Light marathyssa, Marathyssa inficita

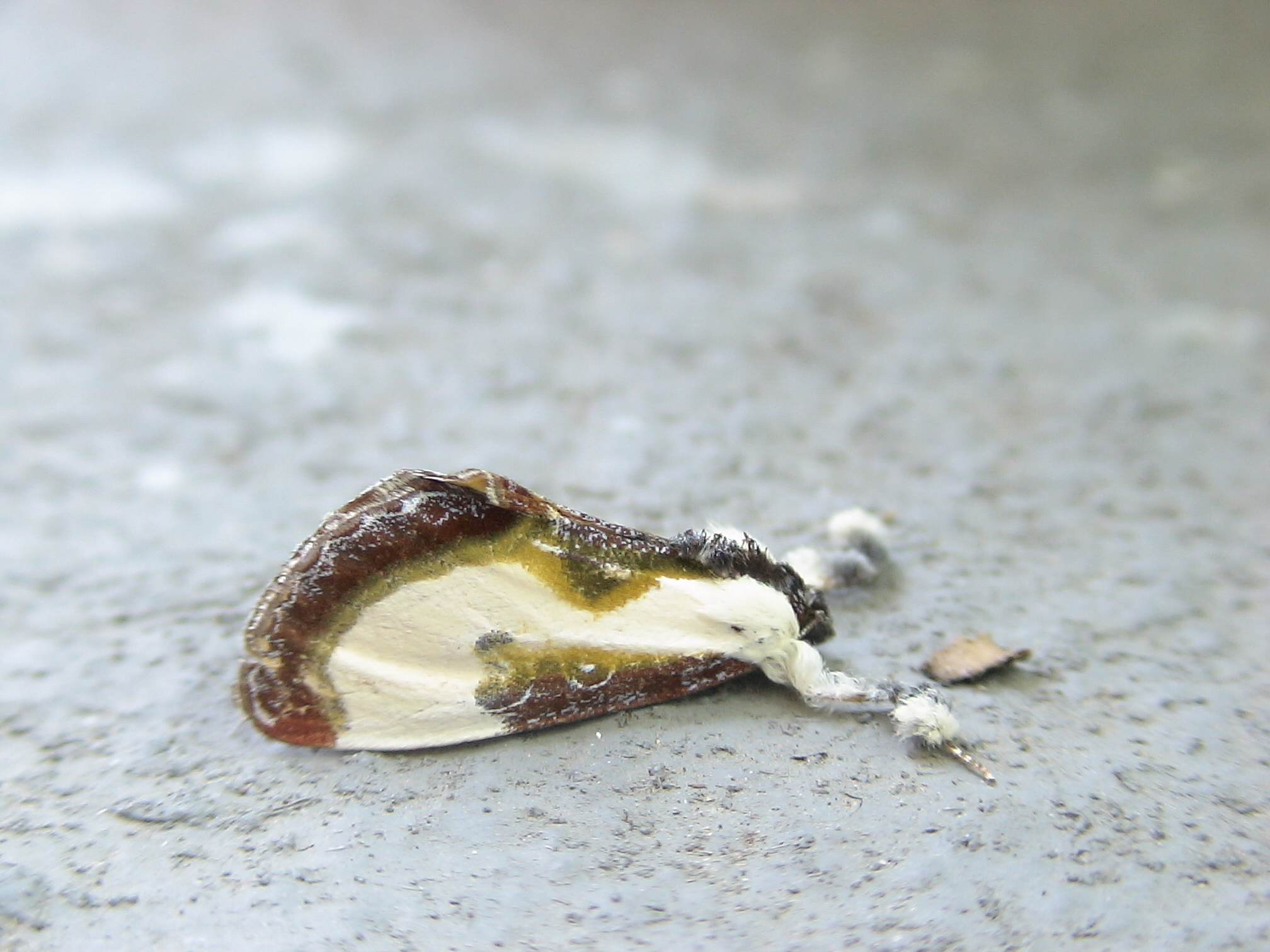
Beautiful wood-nymph

=== Erebidae ===
==== Agaristinae ====
- Grapevine epimenis, Psychomorpha epimenis
- Eight-spotted forester, Alypia octomaculata
- Beautiful wood-nymph, Eudryas grata
- Pearly wood-nymph, Eudryas unio
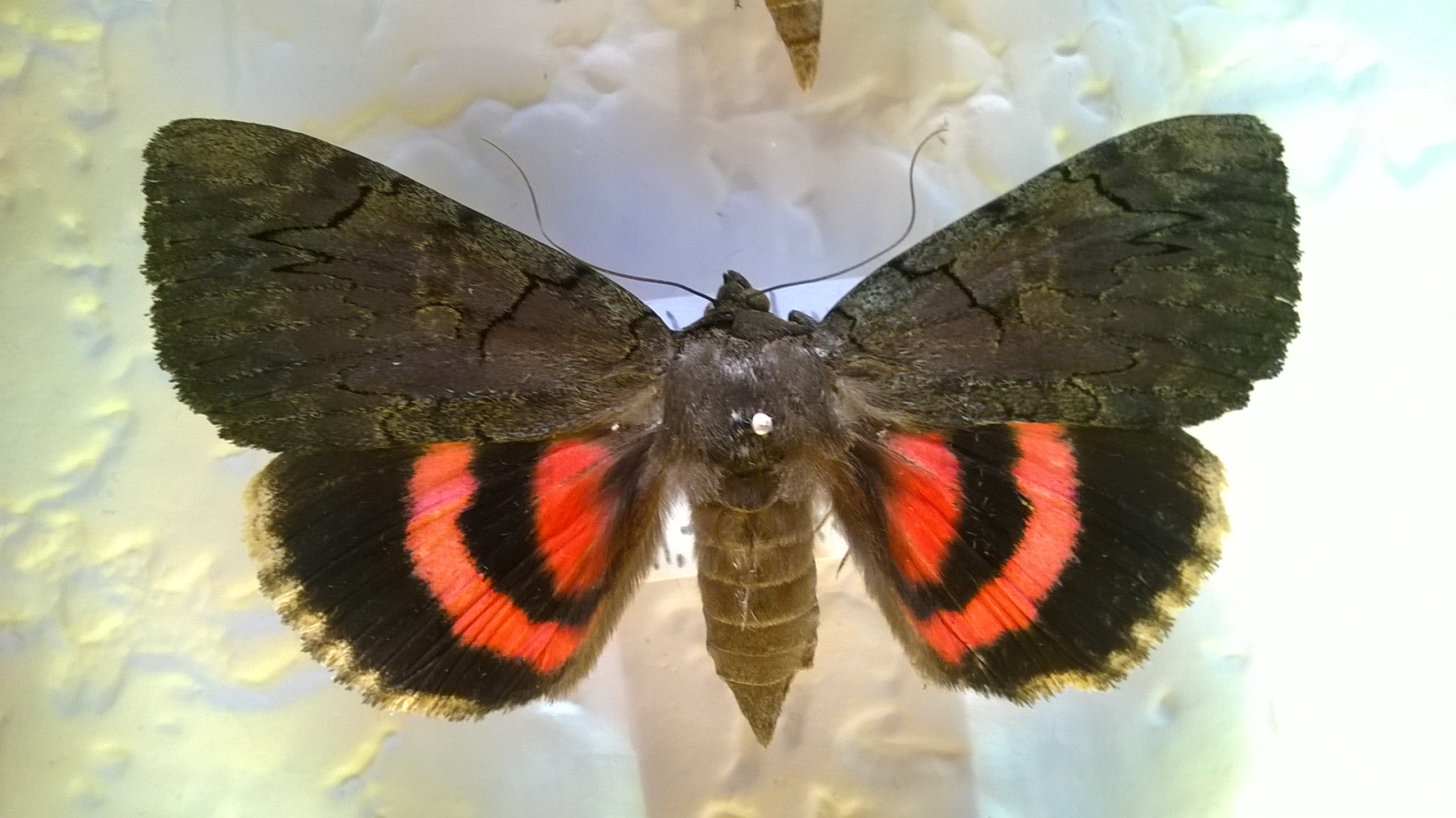
  Catocala cara
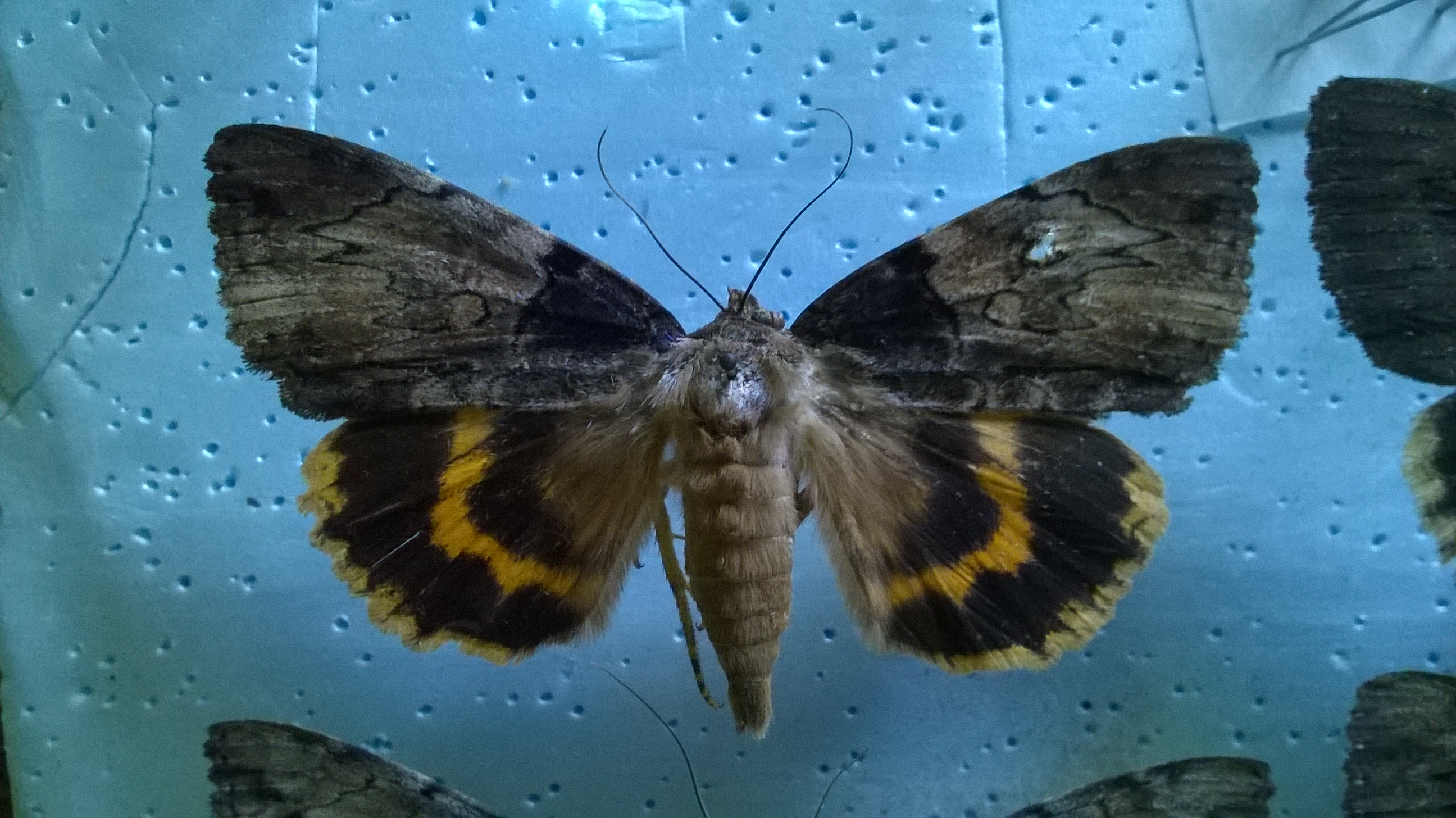
  Catocala nebulosa

==== Erebinae ====
- Mother underwing, Catocala parta
- Clinton's underwing, Catocala clintonii
- Sweetheart underwing, Catocala amatrix
- Darling underwing, Catocala cara
- Clouded underwing, Catocala nebulosa
- Little lined underwing, Catocala lineella
- Woody underwing, Catocala grynea
- Widow underwing, Catocala vidua
- Penitent underwing, Catocala piatrix
- The betrothed, Catocala innubens
- The bride, Catocala neogama
- Youthful underwing, Catocala subnata
- Ultronia underwing, Catocala ultronia
- Oldwife underwing, Catocala palaeogama
- Charming underwing, Catocala blandula
- White underwing, Catocala relicta
- Lunate zale, Zale lunata
- Locust underwing, Euparthenos nubilis

==== Arctiinae ====
- Virgin tiger moth, Grammia virgo
- Harnessed tiger moth, Apantesis phalerata
