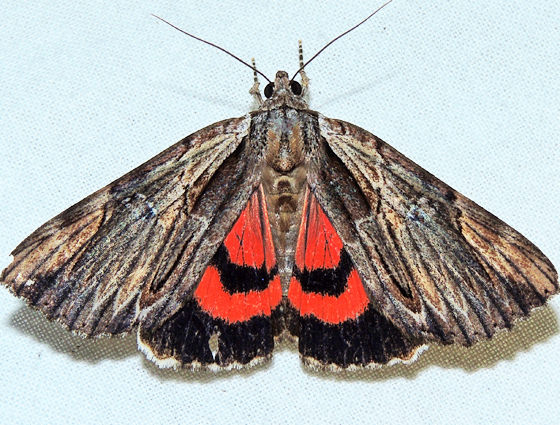

Scientific classification
- Kingdom: Animalia
- Phylum: Arthropoda
- Clade: Pancrustacea
- Class: Insecta
- Order: Lepidoptera
- Superfamily: Noctuoidea
- Family: Erebidae
- Genus: Catocala
- Species: C. ultronia

Binomial name
- Catocala ultronia (Hübner, 1823)

Synonyms
- Eunetis ultronia Hübner, 1823; Catocala ultronia var. mopsa H. Edwards, 1880; Catocala ultronia var. lucinda Beutenmüller, 1907; Catocala adriana H. Edwards, 1880; Catocala ultronia var. celia H. Edwards, 1880; Catocala nigrescens Cassino, 1917

= Catocala ultronia =

Dark red underwing

Species of moth

Catocala ultronia, the dark red underwing or ultronia underwing, is a moth of the family Erebidae. The species was first described by Jacob Hübner in 1823. It is found in most of eastern North America, south to Florida and Texas. It ranges west across the southern parts of Canada to extreme southeast British Columbia.

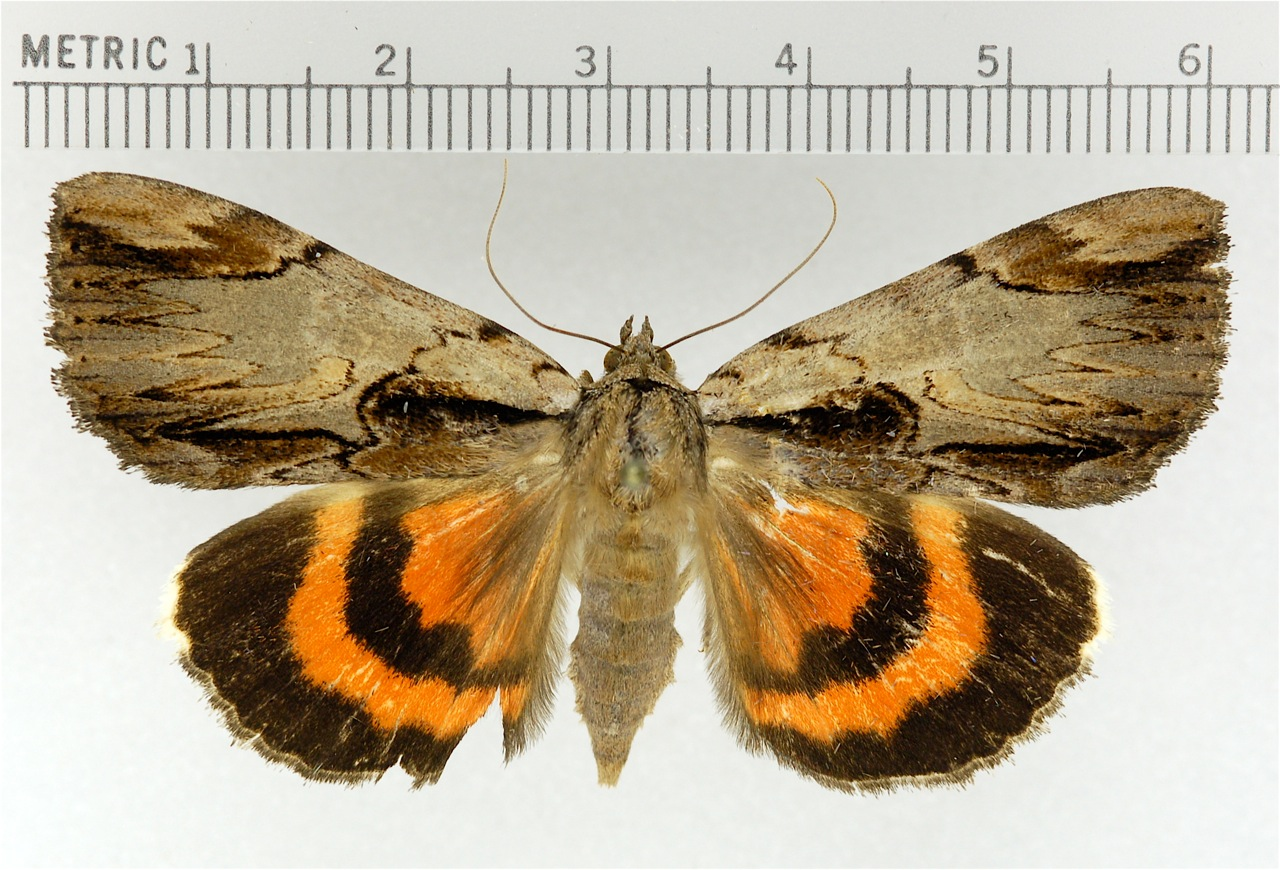
Adult

The wingspan is 46–60 mm. Adults are on wing in August in one generation depending on the location.

The larvae feed on Fraxinus pennsylvanica, Malus species, Populus grandidentata, Prunus pensylvanica, Prunus serotina, Prunus virginiana, and Tilia americana.
