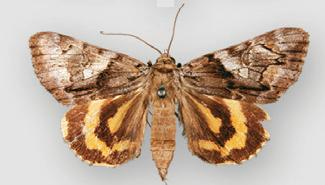

Scientific classification
- Kingdom: Animalia
- Phylum: Arthropoda
- Class: Insecta
- Order: Lepidoptera
- Superfamily: Noctuoidea
- Family: Erebidae
- Genus: Catocala
- Species: C. blandula

Binomial name
- Catocala blandula Hulst, 1884

Synonyms
- Catocala manitobensis Cassino, 1918

= Catocala blandula =

Species of moth

Catocala blandula, the charming underwing, is a moth of the family Erebidae. The species was first described by George Duryea Hulst in 1884. It is found in North America from Nova Scotia west to central Alberta, south to Pennsylvania and Wisconsin.

The wingspan is 42–50 mm. Adults are on wing from July to September depending on the location.

The larvae feed on Amelanchier, Malus sylvestris and Crataegus.

== Subspecies ==
Catocala blandula manitobensis, recorded from Manitoba, is now considered a synonym.
