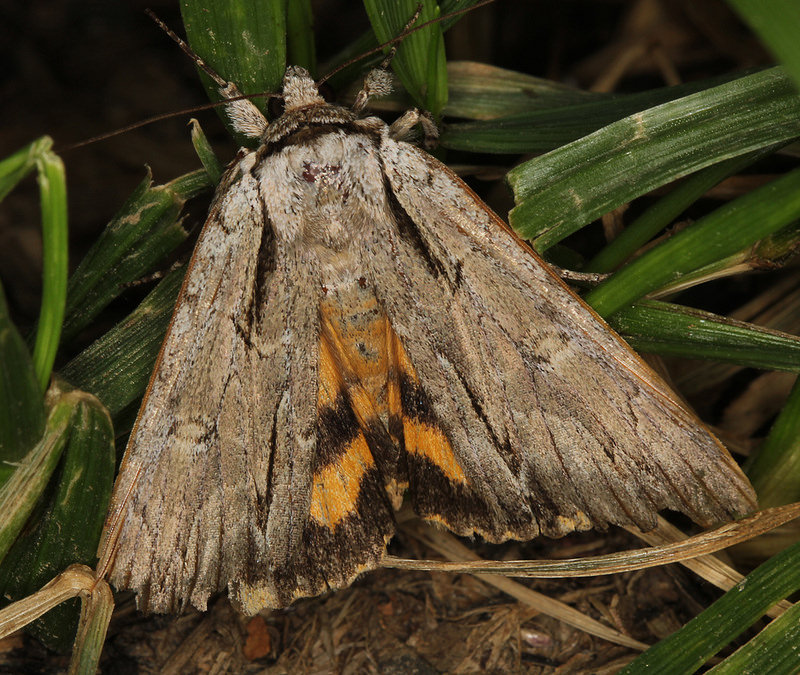

Scientific classification
- Kingdom: Animalia
- Phylum: Arthropoda
- Class: Insecta
- Order: Lepidoptera
- Superfamily: Noctuoidea
- Family: Erebidae
- Genus: Catocala
- Species: C. clintoni

Binomial name
- Catocala clintoni Grote, 1864

Synonyms
- Catocala clintonii Dyar, [1903]

= Catocala clintoni =

Clinton's underwing

Species of moth

Catocala clintoni, Clinton's underwing, is a moth of the family Erebidae. It is found from Ontario and Quebec, southward to Florida, west to Texas and north to Wisconsin.

The wingspan is 45–55 mm. Adults are on wing from February to July depending on the location. There is probably one generation per year.

The larvae feed on Crataegus, Gleditsia triacanthos, Malus pumila, Prunus americana, Prunus ilicifolia and Ulmus.
