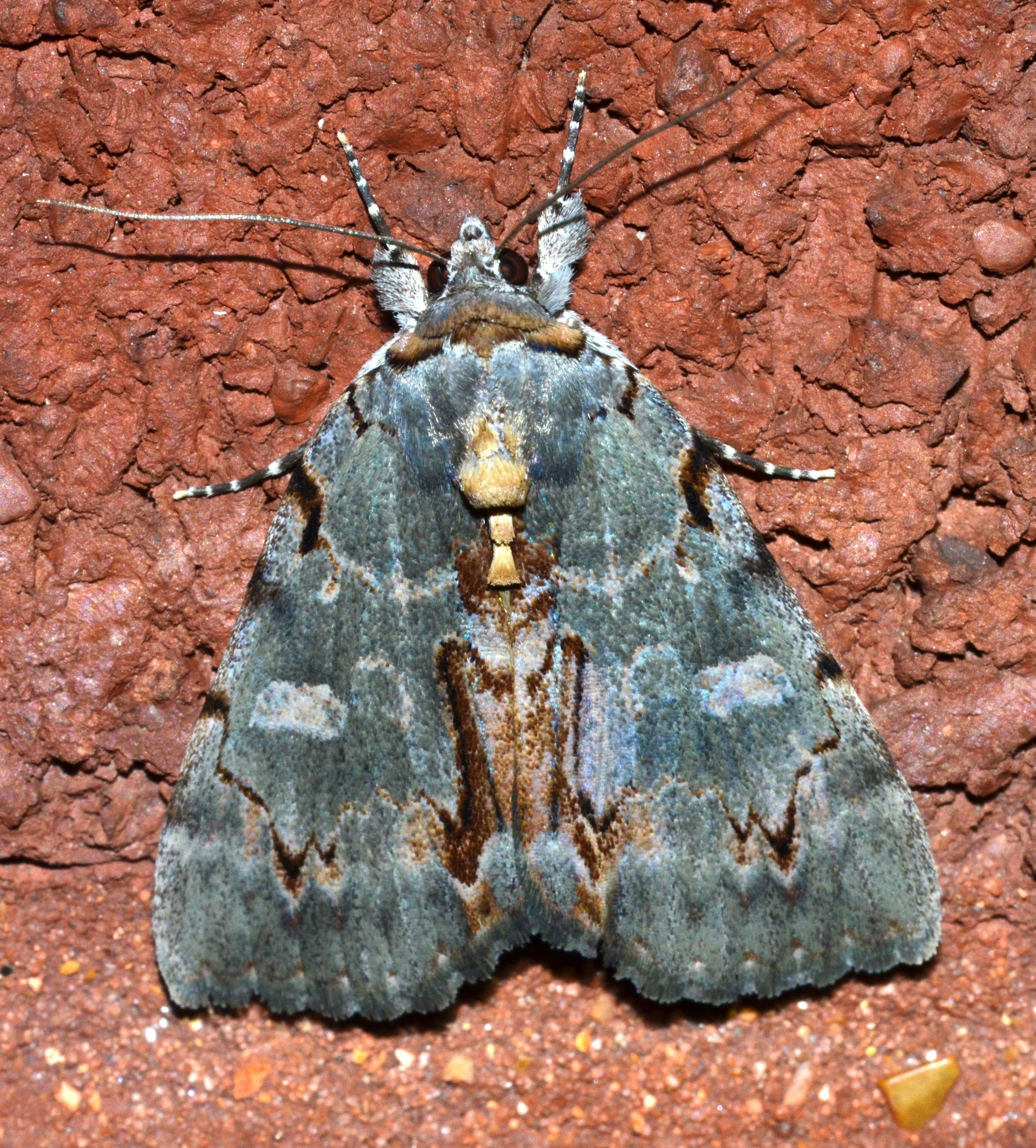

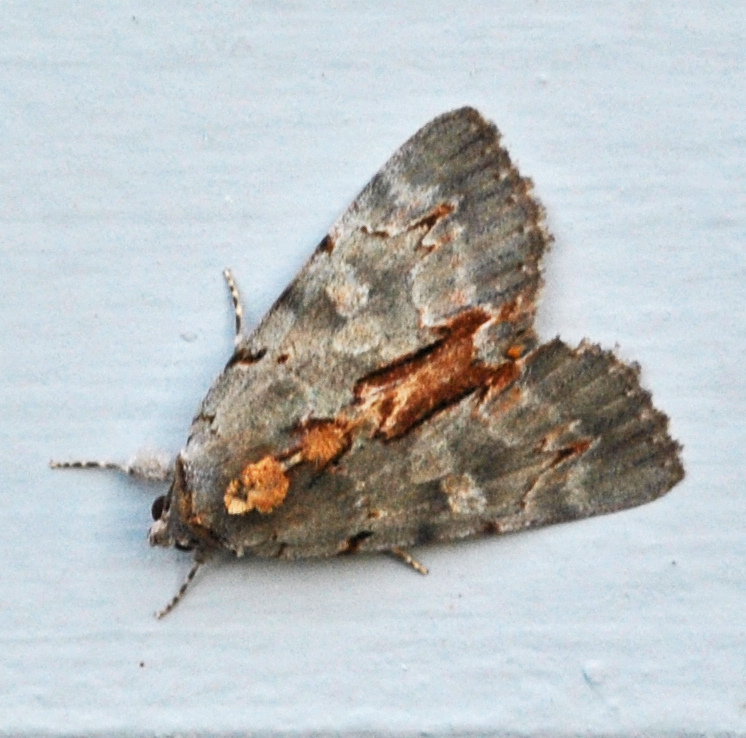

Scientific classification
- Kingdom: Animalia
- Phylum: Arthropoda
- Class: Insecta
- Order: Lepidoptera
- Superfamily: Noctuoidea
- Family: Erebidae
- Genus: Catocala
- Species: C. grynea

Binomial name
- Catocala grynea Cramer, 1780

Synonyms
- Ephesia grynea; Phalaena grynea Cramer, [1780]; Catocala polygama Guenée, 1852; Catocala nuptula Walker, [1858]; Catocala constans Hulst, 1884; Catocala grynea constans

= Catocala grynea =

Woody underwing

Species of moth

Catocala grynea, the woody underwing, is a moth of the family Erebidae. The species was first described by Pieter Cramer in 1780. It is found in North America from Ontario and Quebec through Maine and Connecticut, south to Florida, west to Texas and north through Iowa to Wisconsin and Minnesota.

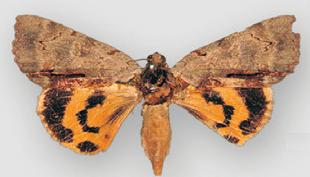
Lectotype of Catocala nuptula, now considered to be a synonym of Catocala grynea

The wingspan is 40–50 mm. Adults are on wing from May to September depending on the location. There is probably one generation per year.

The larvae feed on Crataegus, Prunus and Malus.
