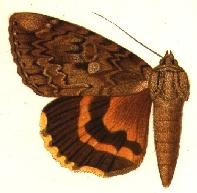

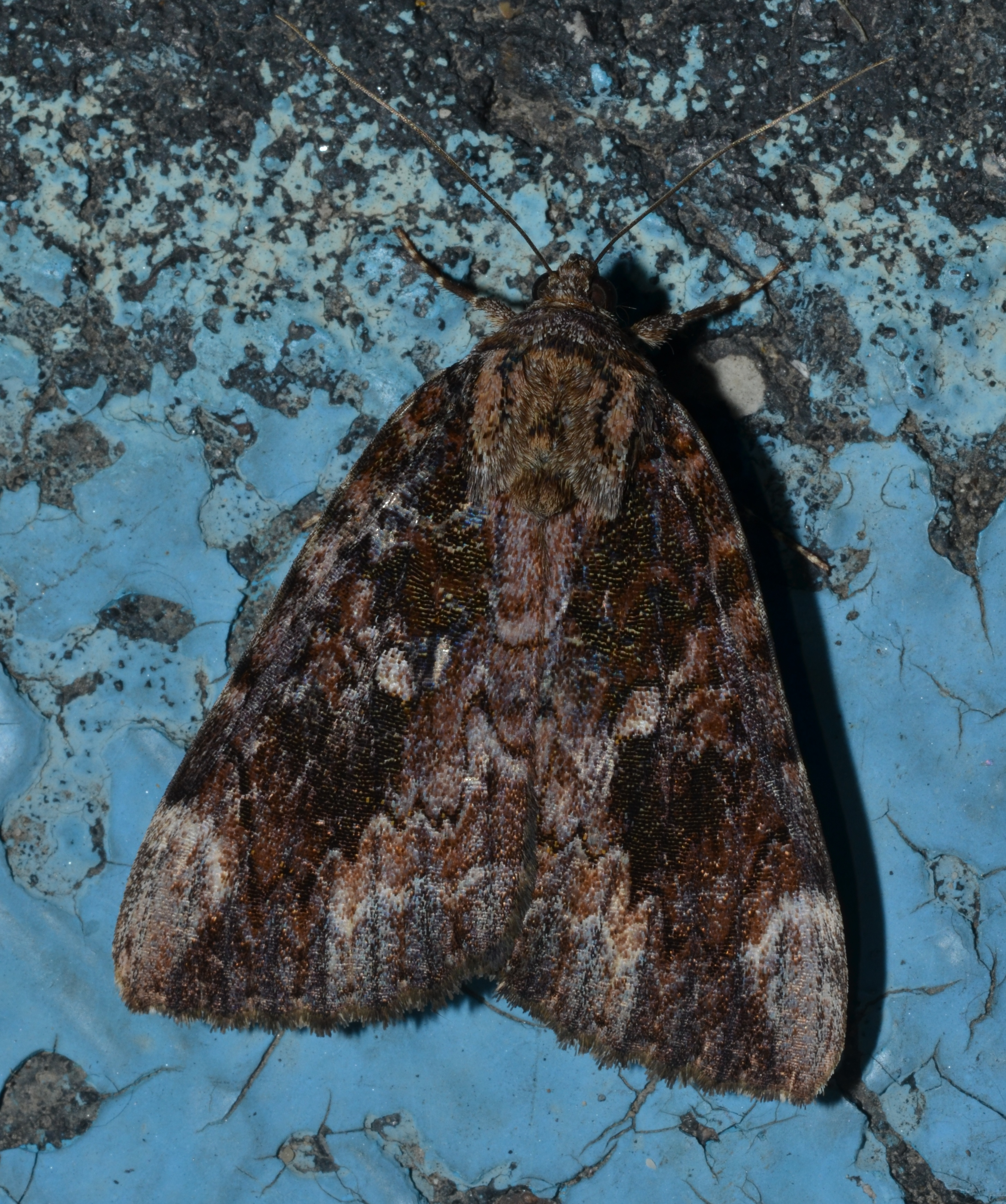

Scientific classification
- Kingdom: Animalia
- Phylum: Arthropoda
- Class: Insecta
- Order: Lepidoptera
- Superfamily: Noctuoidea
- Family: Erebidae
- Genus: Catocala
- Species: C. innubens

Binomial name
- Catocala innubens Guenée, 1852

Synonyms
- Catabapta innubens; Catocala hinda French, 1881; Catocala innubenta Strand, 1914; Catocala scintillans Grote & Robinson, 1866; Catocala innubens var. flavidalis Grote, 1874; Catocala innubens flavidalis; Catocala innubens scintillans; Catocala innubens hinda

= Catocala innubens =

Betrothed underwing

Species of moth

Catocala innubens, the betrothed underwing, is a moth of the family Erebidae. The species was first described by Achille Guenée in 1852. It is found in North America from southern Ontario and Quebec (where it is rare) south through Michigan, Connecticut, Tennessee to Florida and west to Texas and Oklahoma and north to Wisconsin.

The wingspan is 55–72 mm. Adults are on wing from June to September depending on the location. There is one generation per year.

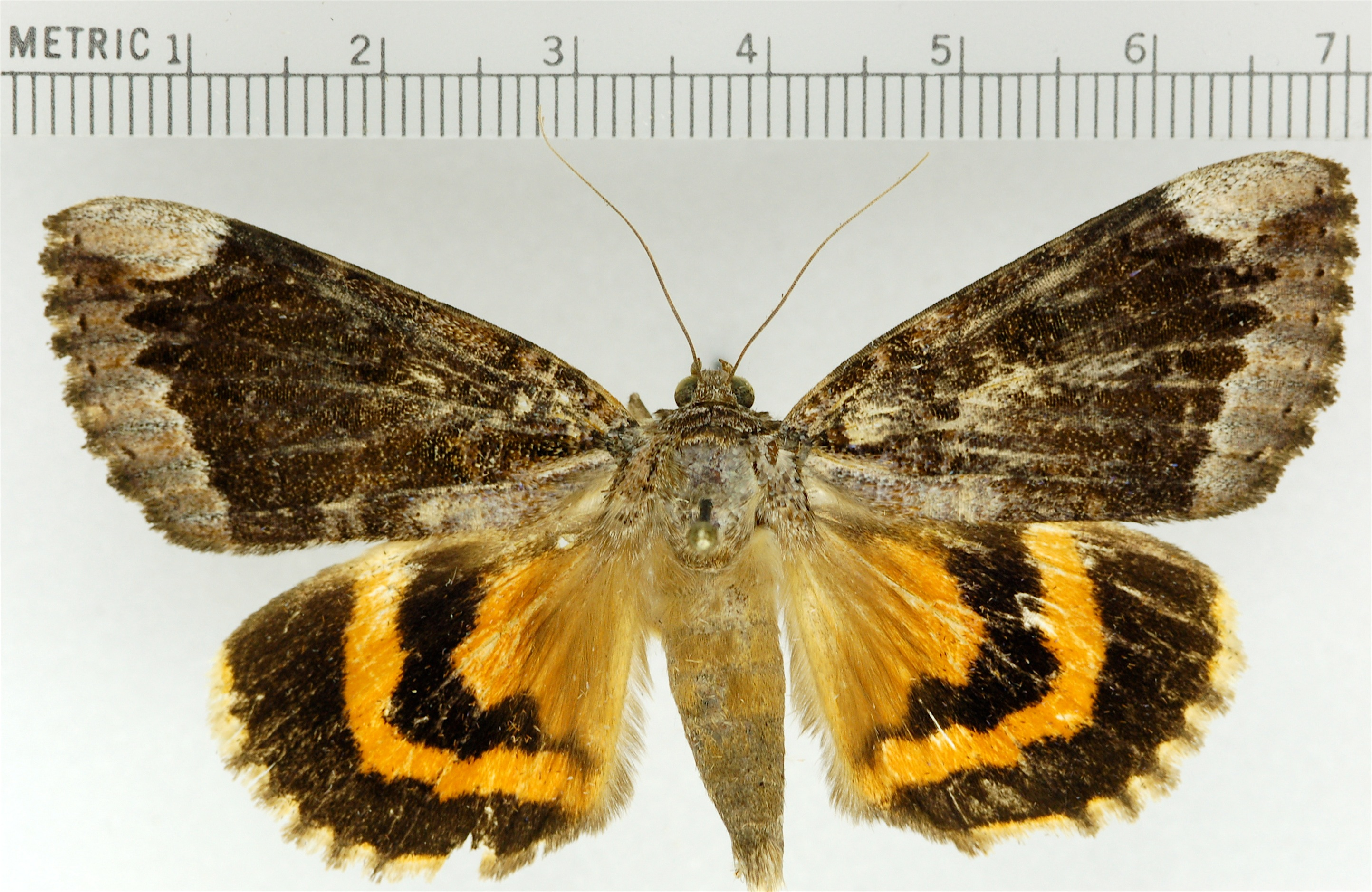

The larvae feed on Gleditsia triacanthos.
