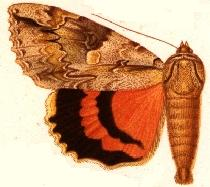

Scientific classification
- Kingdom: Animalia
- Phylum: Arthropoda
- Class: Insecta
- Order: Lepidoptera
- Superfamily: Noctuoidea
- Family: Erebidae
- Genus: Catocala
- Species: C. parta

Binomial name
- Catocala parta Guenée, 1852

Synonyms
- Catocala petulans Hulst, 1884; Catocala forbesi Franclemont, 1938; Catocala parta var. perplexa Strecker, 1873

= Catocala parta =

Mother underwing

Species of moth

Catocala parta, the mother underwing, is a moth of the family Erebidae. The species was first described by Achille Guenée in 1852. It is found in North America from Nova Scotia south to Maryland and Kentucky, west to southern Saskatchewan and Alberta, western Montana, and Utah. The wingspan is 70–78 mm. Adults are on wing from August to September depending on the location.

The larvae feed on Populus and Salix species.
