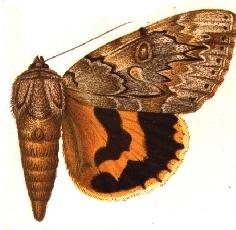

Scientific classification
- Kingdom: Animalia
- Phylum: Arthropoda
- Class: Insecta
- Order: Lepidoptera
- Superfamily: Noctuoidea
- Family: Erebidae
- Genus: Catocala
- Species: C. subnata

Binomial name
- Catocala subnata Grote, 1864

Synonyms
- Catabapta subnata; Catocala subnatana Strand, 1914

= Catocala subnata =

Species of moth

Catocala subnata, the youthful underwing, is a moth of the family Erebidae. The species was first described by Augustus Radcliffe Grote in 1864. It is found in North America from Manitoba, Ontario, Quebec, and New Brunswick to Nova Scotia, south through Maine and Connecticut to North Carolina and west to Tennessee, Kentucky, and Texas, then north to Iowa, Wisconsin, and Michigan.

The wingspan is 75–90 mm. Adults are on wing from July to September depending on the location. There is probably one generation per year.

The larvae feed on Carya cordiformis, Juglans cinerea and Juglans nigra.
