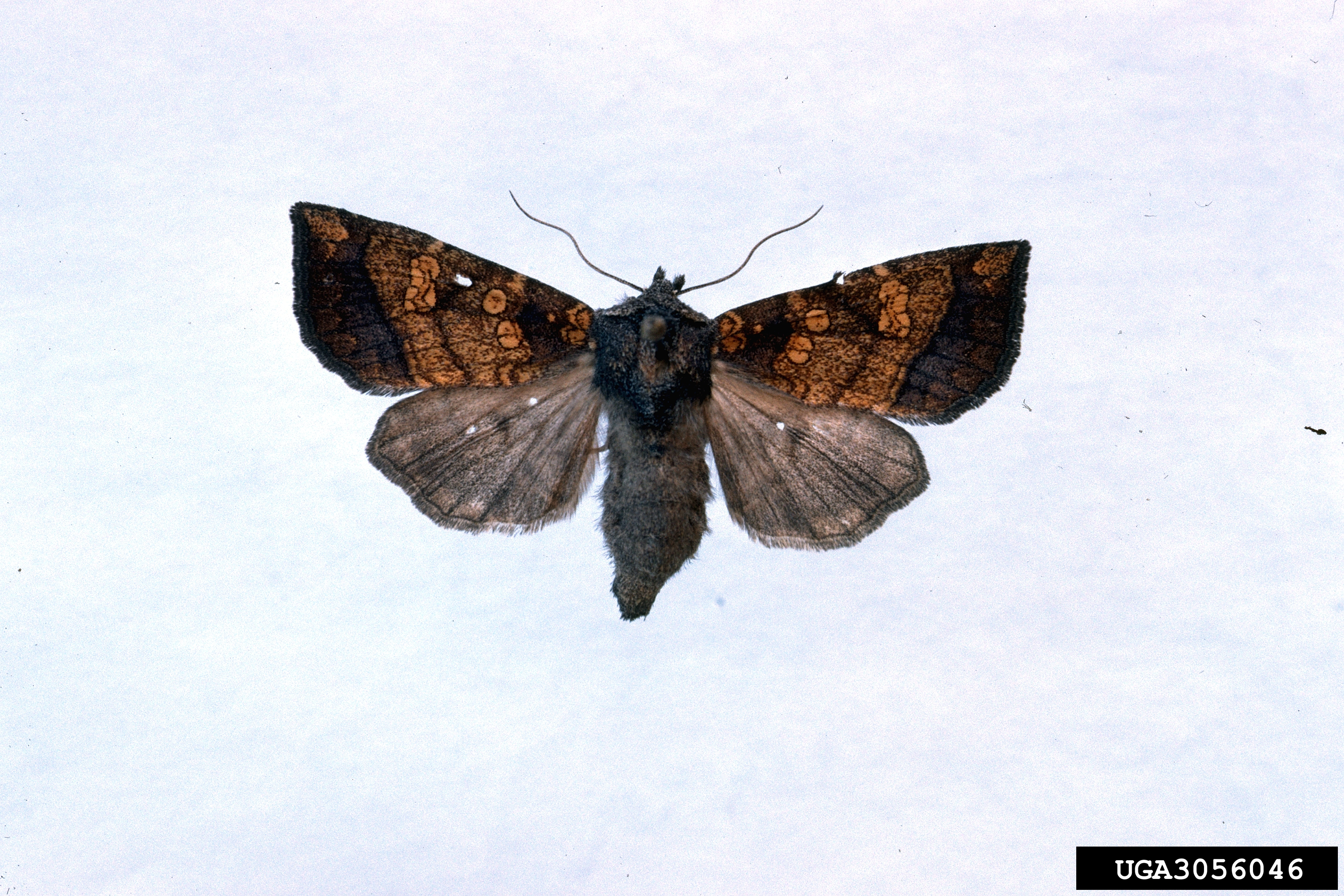
- Female

Scientific classification
- Domain: Eukaryota
- Kingdom: Animalia
- Phylum: Arthropoda
- Class: Insecta
- Order: Lepidoptera
- Superfamily: Noctuoidea
- Family: Noctuidae
- Genus: Papaipema
- Species: P. cataphracta

Binomial name
- Papaipema cataphracta Grote, 1864

Synonyms
- Gortyna cataphracta

= Papaipema cataphracta =

Burdock borer

Species of moth

Papaipema cataphracta, the burdock borer, is a moth of the family Noctuidae. It is found from Quebec and Maine to Florida, west to Louisiana, north to Saskatchewan.

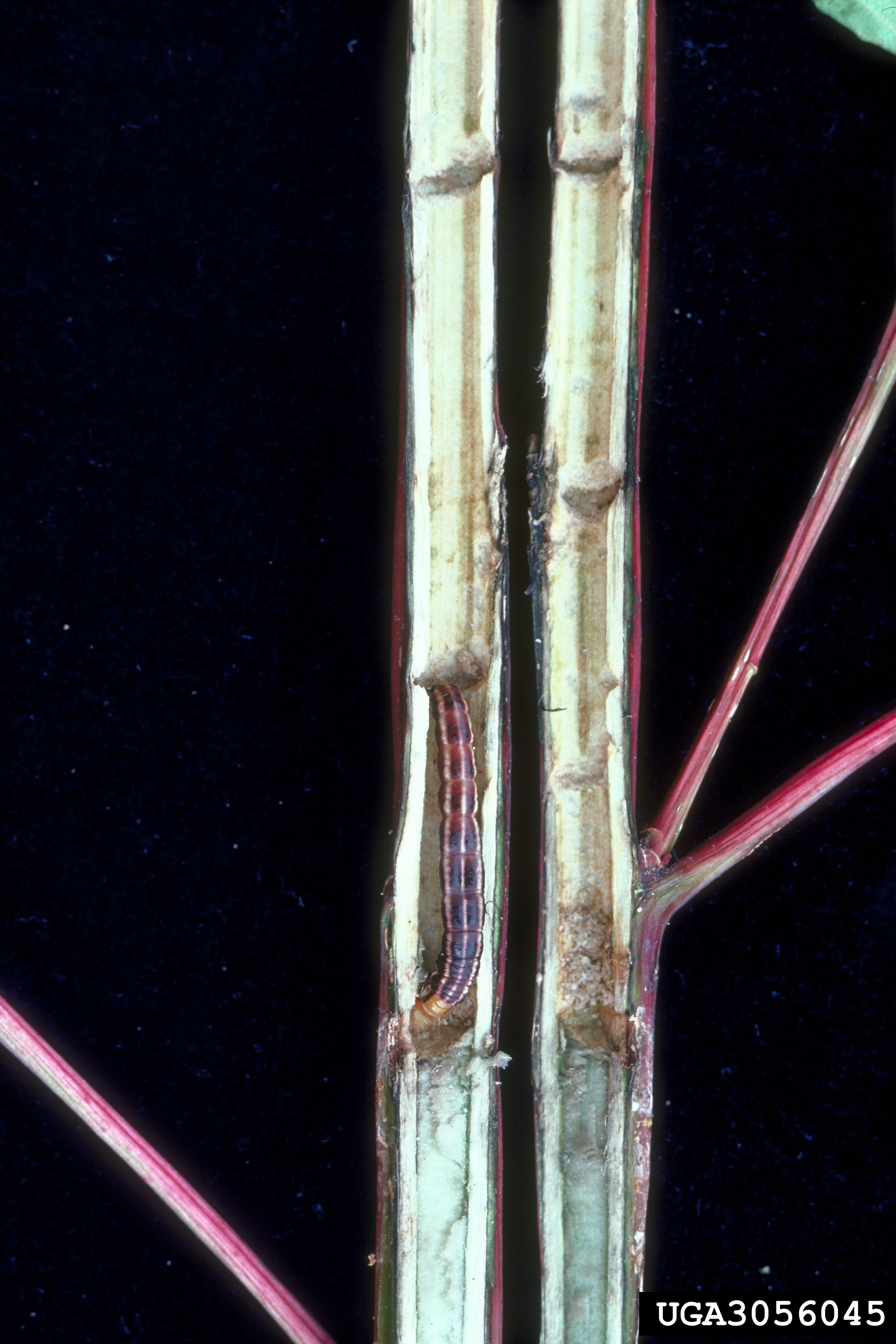
Caterpillar

The wingspan is 29–45 mm. The moth flies from August to October depending on the location.

The larvae feed on various plants, including Arctium, Lilium, and Thistles. They bore into the roots and stems of their host plants.
