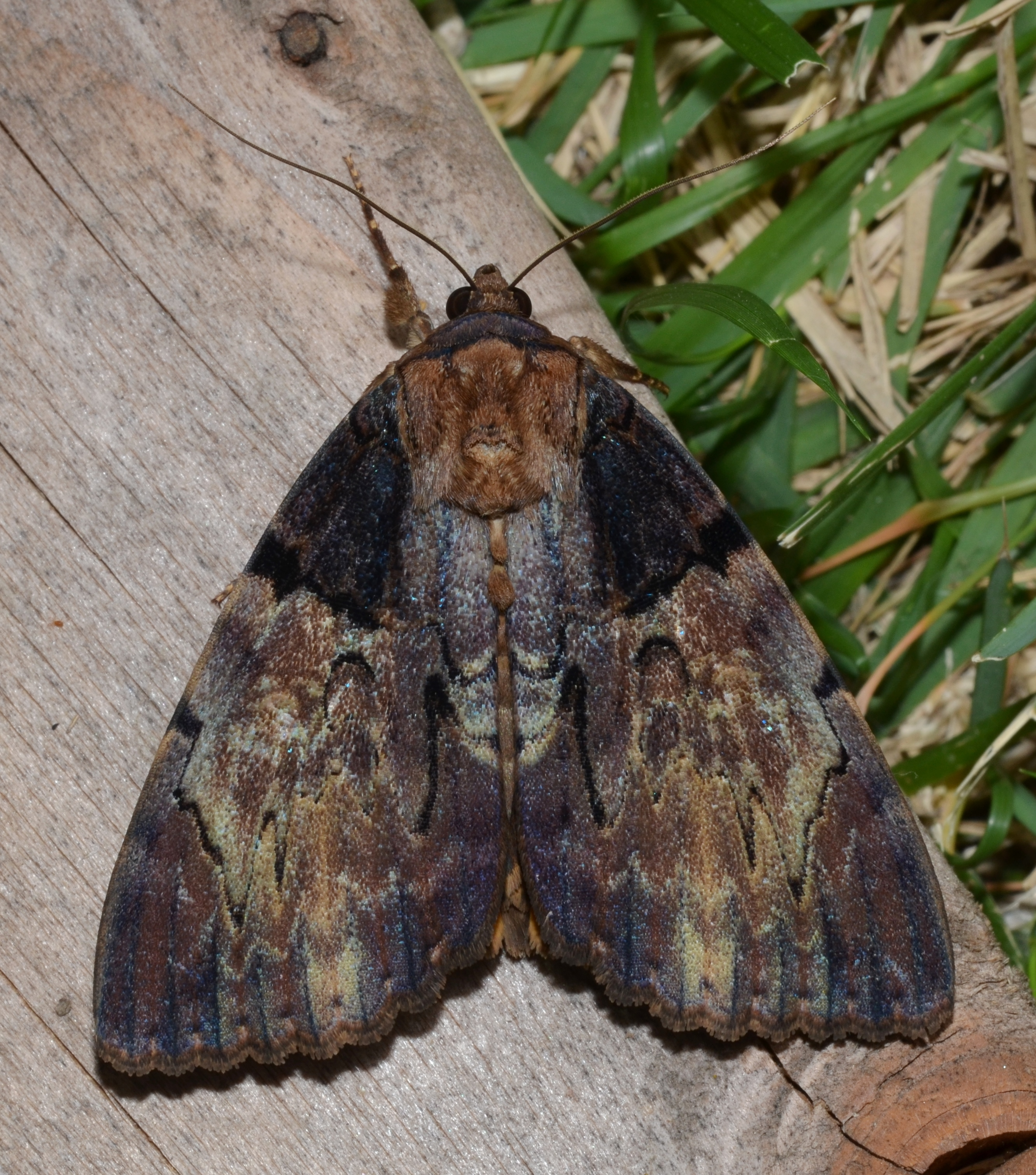

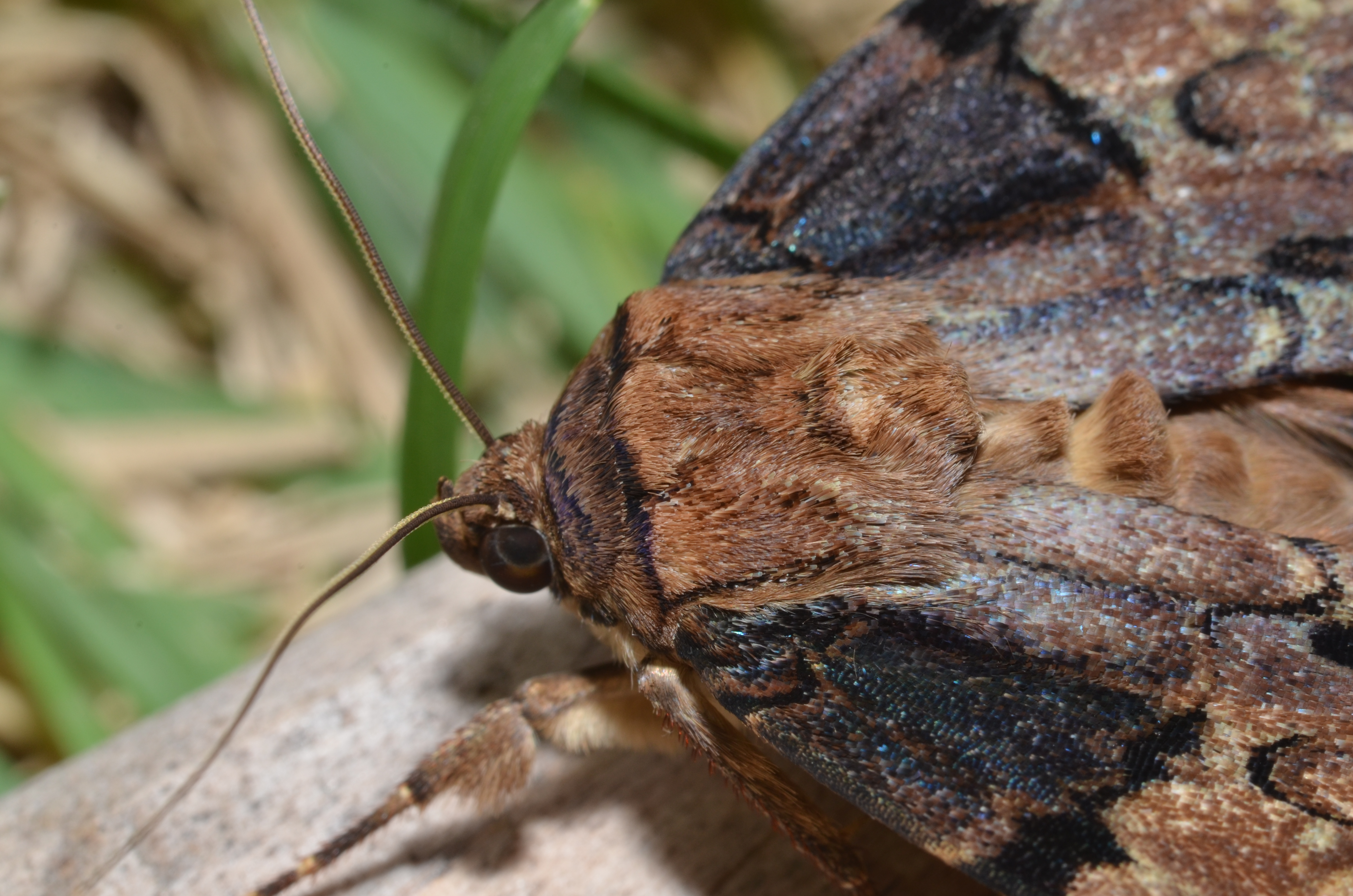

Scientific classification
- Kingdom: Animalia
- Phylum: Arthropoda
- Class: Insecta
- Order: Lepidoptera
- Superfamily: Noctuoidea
- Family: Erebidae
- Genus: Catocala
- Species: C. nebulosa

Binomial name
- Catocala nebulosa W. H. Edwards, 1864

Synonyms
- Catocala ponderosa Grote & Robinson, 1866; Catabapta nebulosa

= Catocala nebulosa =

Clouded underwing

Species of moth

Catocala nebulosa, the clouded underwing, is a moth of the family Erebidae. The species was first described by William Henry Edwards in 1864. It is found in North America from southern Ontario south through Tennessee to Florida, west to Texas and eastern Oklahoma and north to Iowa, Michigan, Wisconsin and Minnesota.

The wingspan is 75–86 mm. Adults are on wing from July to September depending on the location. There is probably one generation per year.

The larvae feed on Carya cordiformis and Juglans nigra.
