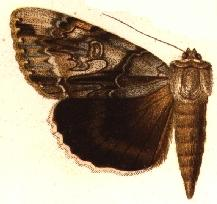

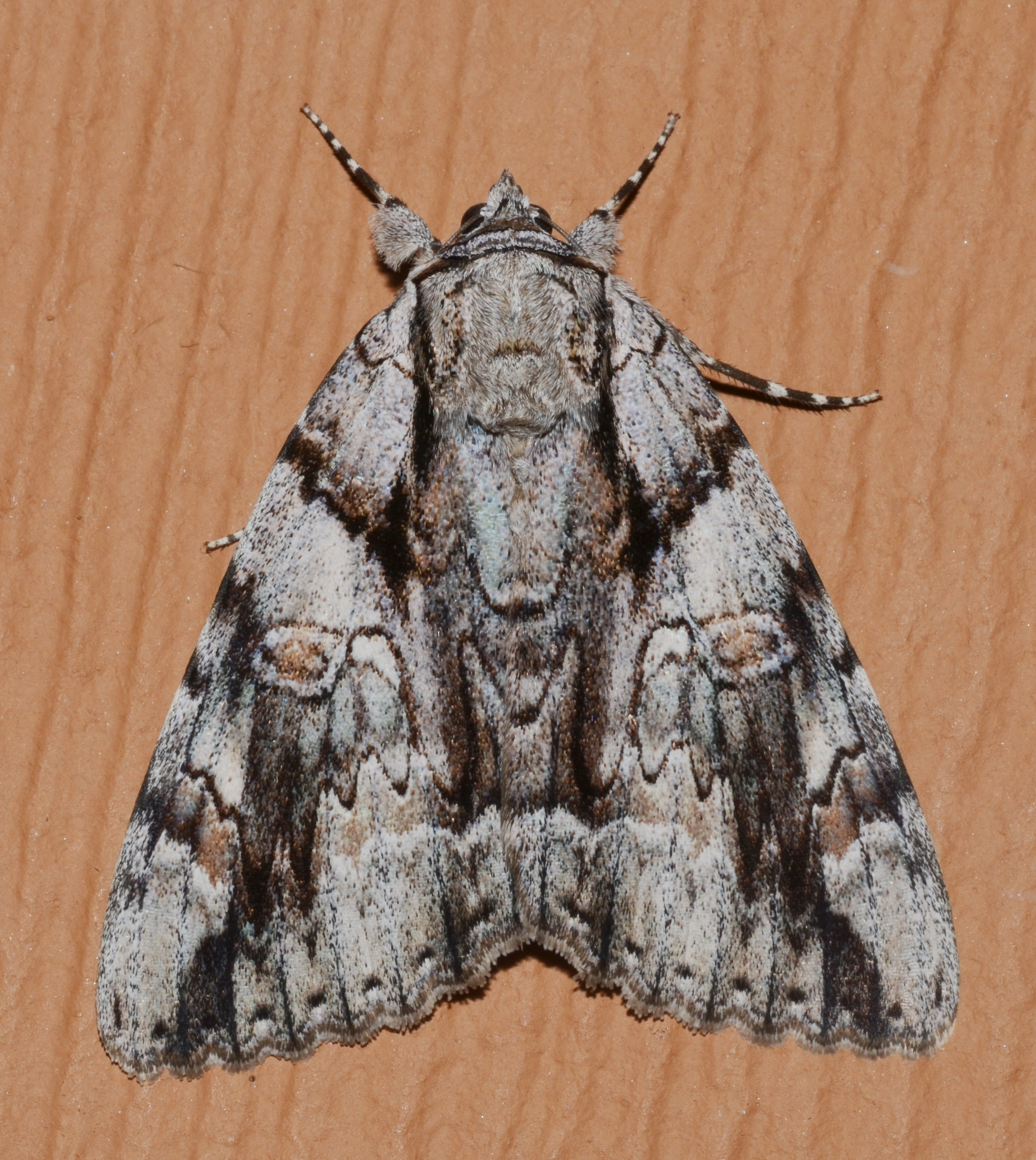

Scientific classification
- Kingdom: Animalia
- Phylum: Arthropoda
- Class: Insecta
- Order: Lepidoptera
- Superfamily: Noctuoidea
- Family: Erebidae
- Genus: Catocala
- Species: C. vidua

Binomial name
- Catocala vidua (J. E. Smith, 1797)

Synonyms
- Catabapta vidua; Phalaena vidua J. E. Smith, 1797; Catocala desperata Guenée, 1852

= Catocala vidua =

Widow underwing

Species of moth

Catocala vidua, the widow underwing, is a moth of the family Erebidae. The species was first described by James Edward Smith in 1797. It is found in North America from southern Ontario, into Maine, New Hampshire and Connecticut, south at least to Tennessee, Georgia and Alabama, west to Texas and Oklahoma, and north to Wisconsin.

The wingspan is 70–80 mm. Adults are on wing from August to October. There is one generation per year.

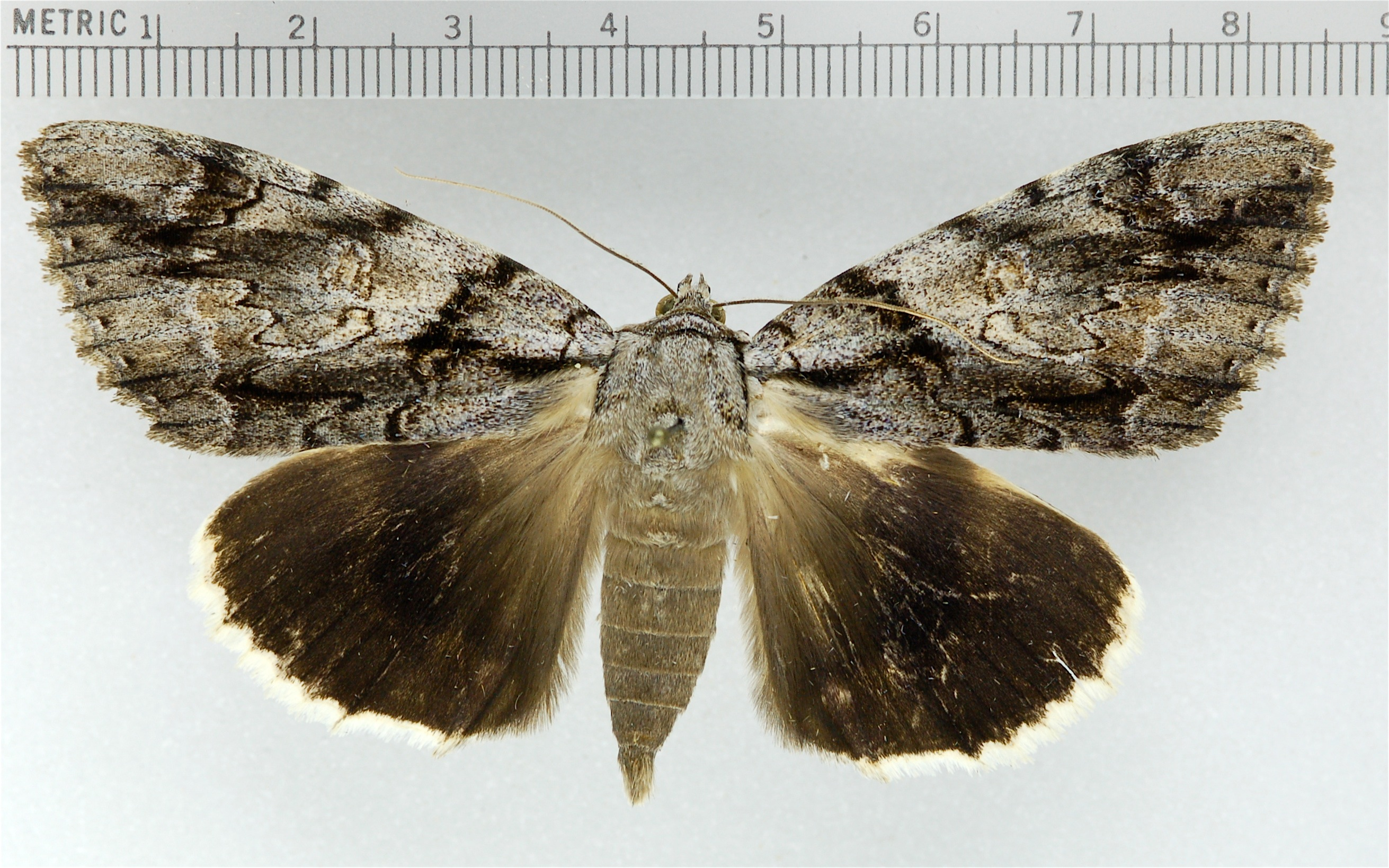

The larvae feed on Carya illinoinensis, Carya ovata, Carya pallida, Juglans cinerea, Juglans nigra, Quercus, Robinia pseudoacacia, and Salix.
