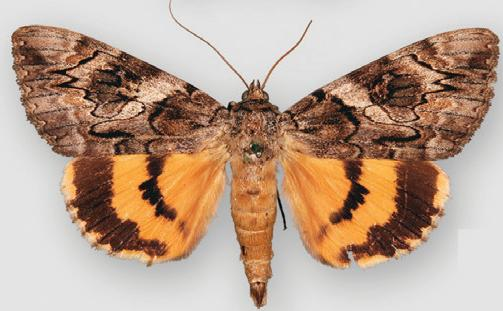
- Catocala piatrix dionyza imago

Scientific classification
- Kingdom: Animalia
- Phylum: Arthropoda
- Clade: Pancrustacea
- Class: Insecta
- Order: Lepidoptera
- Superfamily: Noctuoidea
- Family: Erebidae
- Genus: Catocala
- Species: C. piatrix

Binomial name
- Catocala piatrix Grote, 1864

= Catocala piatrix =

Penitent underwing

Species of moth

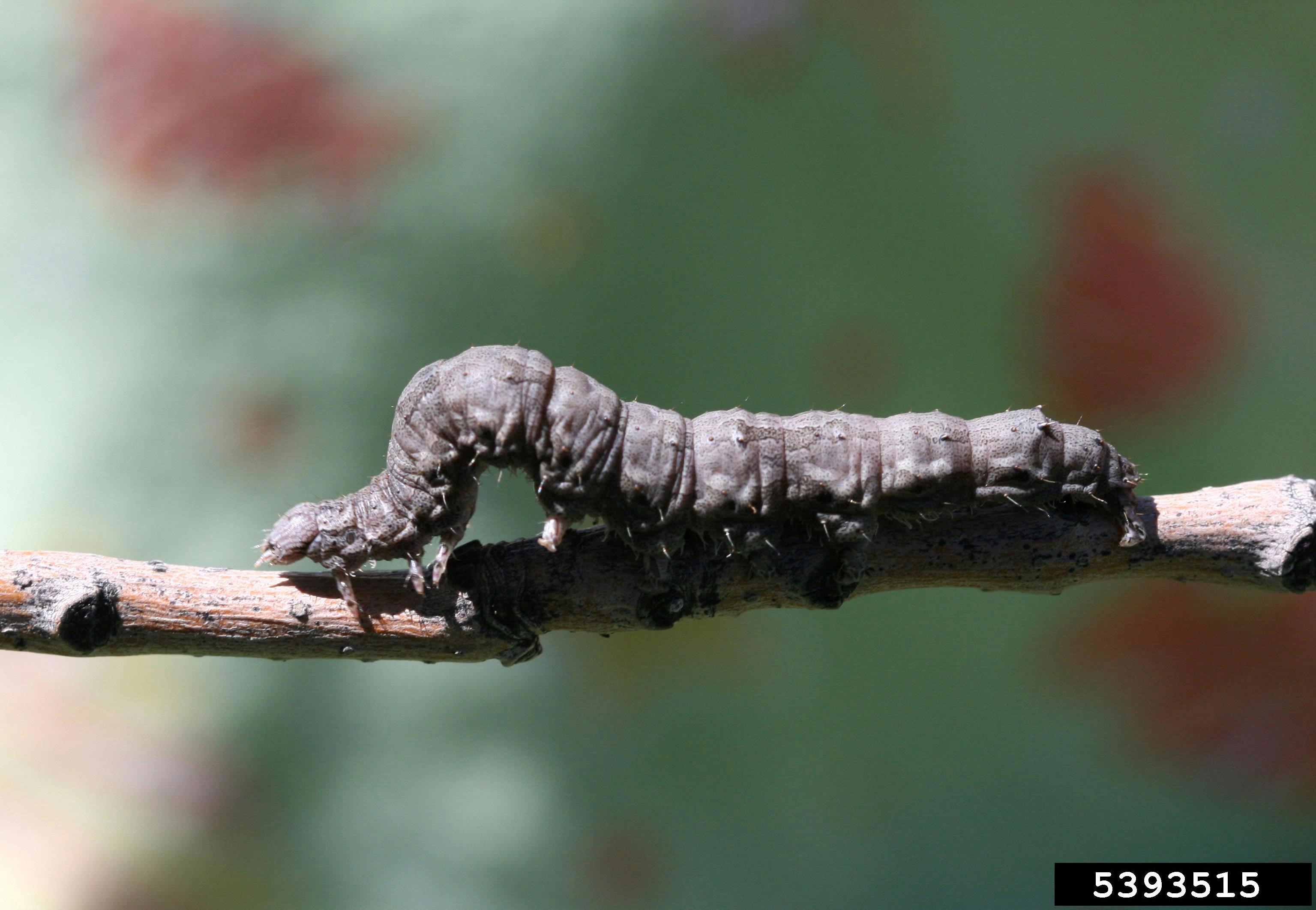
Caterpillar

Catocala piatrix, the penitent underwing, is a moth from North America. The species was first described by Augustus Radcliffe Grote in 1864. It is placed in subfamily Catocalinae, either of the family Noctuidae, or – if the Noctuidae are circumscribed more strictly – of family Erebidae. Within the Catocalinae, it belongs to tribe Catocalini and – if the Noctuidae are circumscribed widely – subtribe Catocalina.

The wingspan of adults is about 70–80 mm. The forewings are dark brownish gray, darkest at the base, and with an oblique lighter band extending from the midwing to the leading edge near the wing base. The hindwings are yellow orange with dark hairs at the base (though these are not especially prominent) and two concentric black bands. The yellow zone separating the black bands is wide, with a relatively smooth edge; the outer edge of the hindwings is light yellow with some black bars extending from the outer band. As typical for hickory-feeding Catocala, both foreleg and hindleg tibiae of this species are spiny, and the tarsi carry four rows of irregular rows of spines each.

The moths fly from July to November depending on the location. The larvae feed on ash, butternut, hickory, pecan, persimmon, and walnut trees.

Subspecies are:

- Catocala piatrix piatrix Grote, 1864
- Catocala piatrix dionyza H. Edwards, 1884

The nominate subspecies can be found in the eastern part of the United States, and the subspecies Catocala piatrix dionyza can be found in Arizona.
