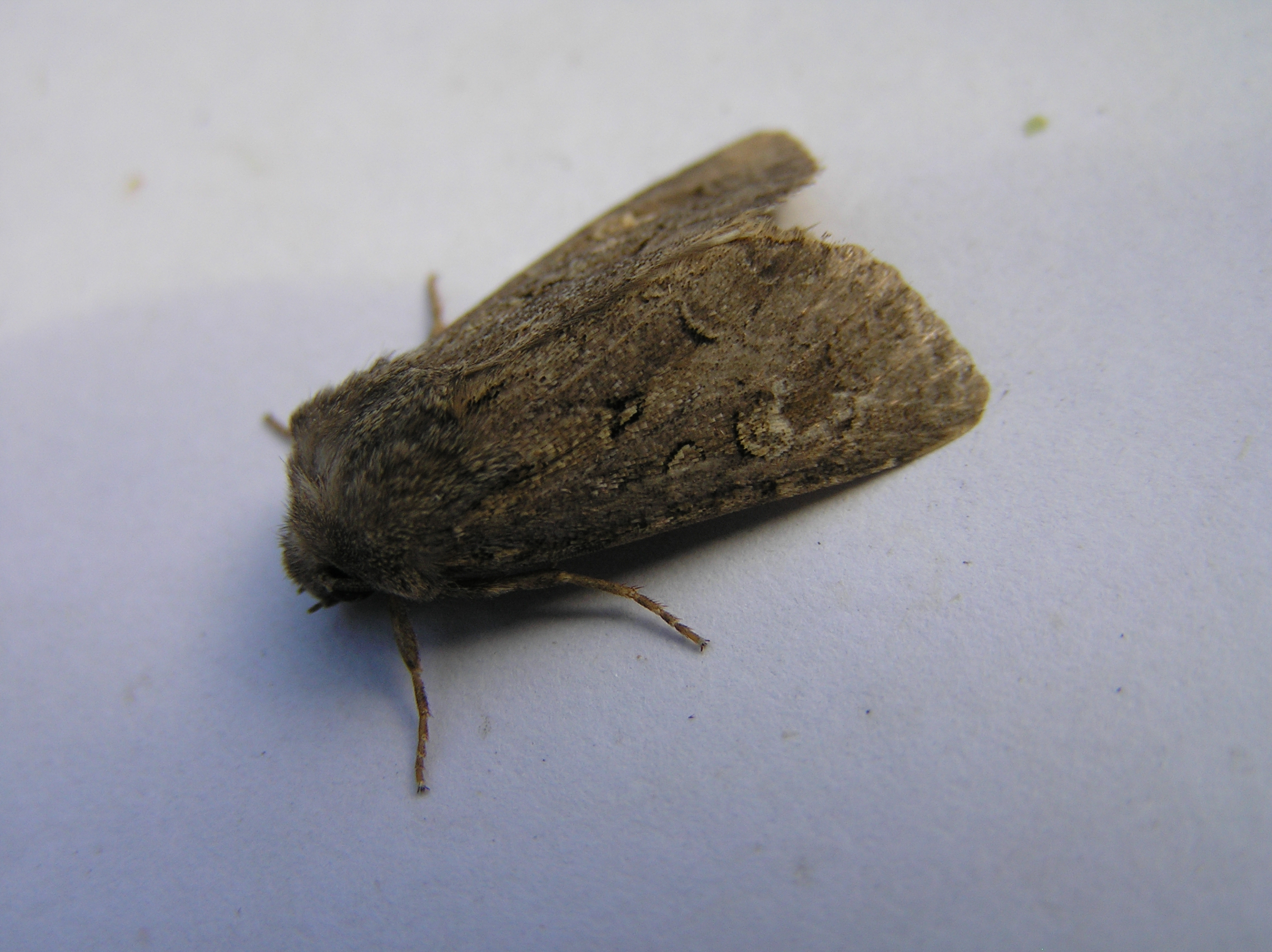

Scientific classification
- Domain: Eukaryota
- Kingdom: Animalia
- Phylum: Arthropoda
- Class: Insecta
- Order: Lepidoptera
- Superfamily: Noctuoidea
- Family: Noctuidae
- Tribe: Apameini
- Genus: Luperina; Boisduval, 1829

= Luperina =

Genus of moths

Luperina is a genus of moths of the family Noctuidae.

== Species ==
- Luperina dayensis Oberthür, 1891
- Luperina diversa (Staudinger, 1891)
- Luperina dumerilii (Duponchel, 1826)
- Luperina farsiensis Fibiger & Zahiri, 2005
- Luperina grzimeki Hacker, 1989
- Luperina imbellis (Staudinger, 1888)
- Luperina jelskii (Oberthür, 1908)
- Luperina kaszabi Boursin, 1967
- Luperina kravchenkoi Fibiger & Müller, 2005
- Luperina kruegeri Turati, 1912
- Luperina lacunosa Kozhantschikov, 1925
- Luperina madeirae Fibiger, 2005
- Luperina nickerlii – Sandhill Rustic (Freyer, 1845)
- Luperina powelli Culot, 1912
- Luperina pseudoderthisa Rothschild, 1914
- Luperina rjabovi (Klyuchko, 1967)
- Luperina rubella (Duponchel, [1838])
- Luperina samnii (Sohn-Rethel, 1929)
- Luperina siegeli Berio, 1986
- Luperina taurica (Klyuchko, 1967)
- Luperina testacea – Flounced Rustic (Denis & Schiffermüller, 1775)
- Luperina tiberina (Sohn-Rethel, 1929)

== Former species ==
- Luperina enargia is now Resapamea enargia (Barnes & Benjamin, 1926)
- Luperina innota is now Resapamea innota (Smith, 1908)
- Luperina passer is now Resapamea passer (Guenée, 1852)
- Luperina stipata is now Resapamea stipata (Morrison, 1875)
- Luperina trigona is now Resapamea trigona (Smith, 1902)
- Luperina venosa is now Resapamea venosa (Smith, 1903)
