= Macronoctua =

Scientific classification
- Kingdom: Animalia
- Phylum: Arthropoda
- Class: Insecta
- Order: Lepidoptera
- Superfamily: Noctuoidea
- Family: Noctuidae
- Tribe: Apameini
- Genus: Macronoctua; Grote, 1874

Genus of moths

Macronoctua is a genus of moths of the family Noctuidae.

== Species ==
- Macronoctua onusta Grote, 1874 (also known as the Iris borer moth)

== Former species ==
- Macronoctua dolens Druce, 1909, now Dypterygia dolens.
