= Meropleon cinnamicolor =

Scientific classification
- Kingdom: Animalia
- Phylum: Arthropoda
- Clade: Pancrustacea
- Class: Insecta
- Order: Lepidoptera
- Superfamily: Noctuoidea
- Family: Noctuidae
- Tribe: Apameini
- Genus: Meropleon
- Species: M. cinnamicolor

Binomial name
- Meropleon cinnamicolor Ferguson, 1982

Species of moth

Meropleon cinnamicolor is a species of cutworm or dart moth in the family Noctuidae. It is found in North America.
