= Eremobina unicincta =

Scientific classification
- Kingdom: Animalia
- Phylum: Arthropoda
- Clade: Pancrustacea
- Class: Insecta
- Order: Lepidoptera
- Superfamily: Noctuoidea
- Family: Noctuidae
- Tribe: Apameini
- Genus: Eremobina
- Species: E. unicincta

Binomial name
- Eremobina unicincta (Smith, 1902)

Species of moth

Eremobina unicincta is a species of cutworm or dart moth in the family Noctuidae. It is found in North America.
