= Meropleon linae =

Scientific classification
- Domain: Eukaryota
- Kingdom: Animalia
- Phylum: Arthropoda
- Class: Insecta
- Order: Lepidoptera
- Superfamily: Noctuoidea
- Family: Noctuidae
- Tribe: Apameini
- Genus: Meropleon
- Species: M. linae

Binomial name
- Meropleon linae Metlevski, 2005

Species of moth

Meropleon linae is a species of cutworm or dart moth in the family Noctuidae. It is found in North America.

The MONA or Hodges number for Meropleon linae is 9425.2.
