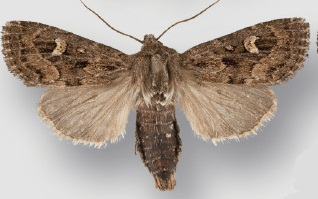
- Resapamea diluvius (male)

Scientific classification
- Domain: Eukaryota
- Kingdom: Animalia
- Phylum: Arthropoda
- Class: Insecta
- Order: Lepidoptera
- Superfamily: Noctuoidea
- Family: Noctuidae
- Tribe: Apameini
- Genus: Resapamea; Varga & Ronkay, 1992

Species
- See text

= Resapamea =

Genus of moths

Resapamea is a genus of moths of the family Noctuidae.

== Species ==
The genus includes the following species:

- Resapamea alticola (Ronkay & Varga, 1998)
- Resapamea angelika Crabo, 2013
- Resapamea diluvius Crabo, 2013
- Resapamea enargia (Barnes & Benjamin, 1926)
- Resapamea hedeni (Graeser, [1889])
- Resapamea innota (Smith, 1908)
- Resapamea mammuthus Crabo, 2013
- Resapamea megaleuca (Varga & Ronkay, 1992)
- Resapamea passer (Guenée, 1852) (syn: Luperina virguncula (Smith, 1899), Luperina morna (Strecker, 1878))
- Resapamea stipata (Morrison, 1875)
- Resapamea tibeticola (Varga & Ronkay, 1992)
- Resapamea trigona (Smith, 1902)
- Resapamea vaskeni (Varga, 1979)
- Resapamea venosa (Smith, 1903)
