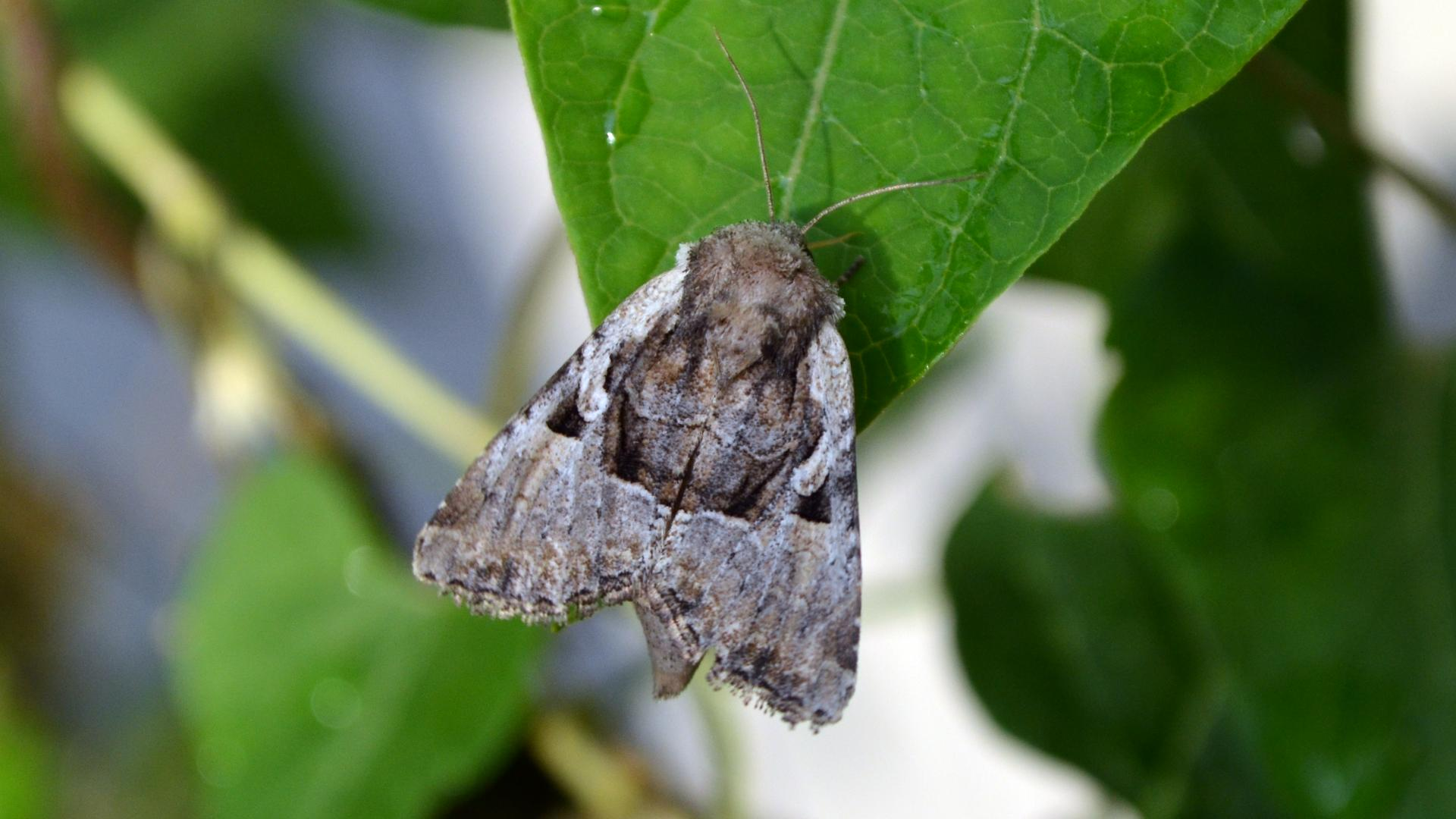

Scientific classification
- Kingdom: Animalia
- Phylum: Arthropoda
- Class: Insecta
- Order: Lepidoptera
- Superfamily: Noctuoidea
- Family: Noctuidae
- Tribe: Apameini
- Genus: Meropleon; Dyar, 1924

= Meropleon =

Genus of moths

Meropleon is a genus of moths of the family Noctuidae.

== Species ==
- Meropleon ambifusca (Newman, 1948)
- Meropleon cinnamicolor Ferguson, 1982
- Meropleon cosmion Dyar, 1924
- Meropleon diversicolor (Morrison, 1875)
- Meropleon linae Metlevski, 2005
- Meropleon titan Todd, 1958
