= Cobalos franciscanus =

Scientific classification
- Domain: Eukaryota
- Kingdom: Animalia
- Phylum: Arthropoda
- Class: Insecta
- Order: Lepidoptera
- Superfamily: Noctuoidea
- Family: Noctuidae
- Tribe: Apameini
- Genus: Cobalos
- Species: C. franciscanus

Binomial name
- Cobalos franciscanus Smith, 1899

Species of moth

Cobalos franciscanus is a species of cutworm or dart moth in the family Noctuidae.

The MONA or Hodges number for Cobalos franciscanus is 9424.
