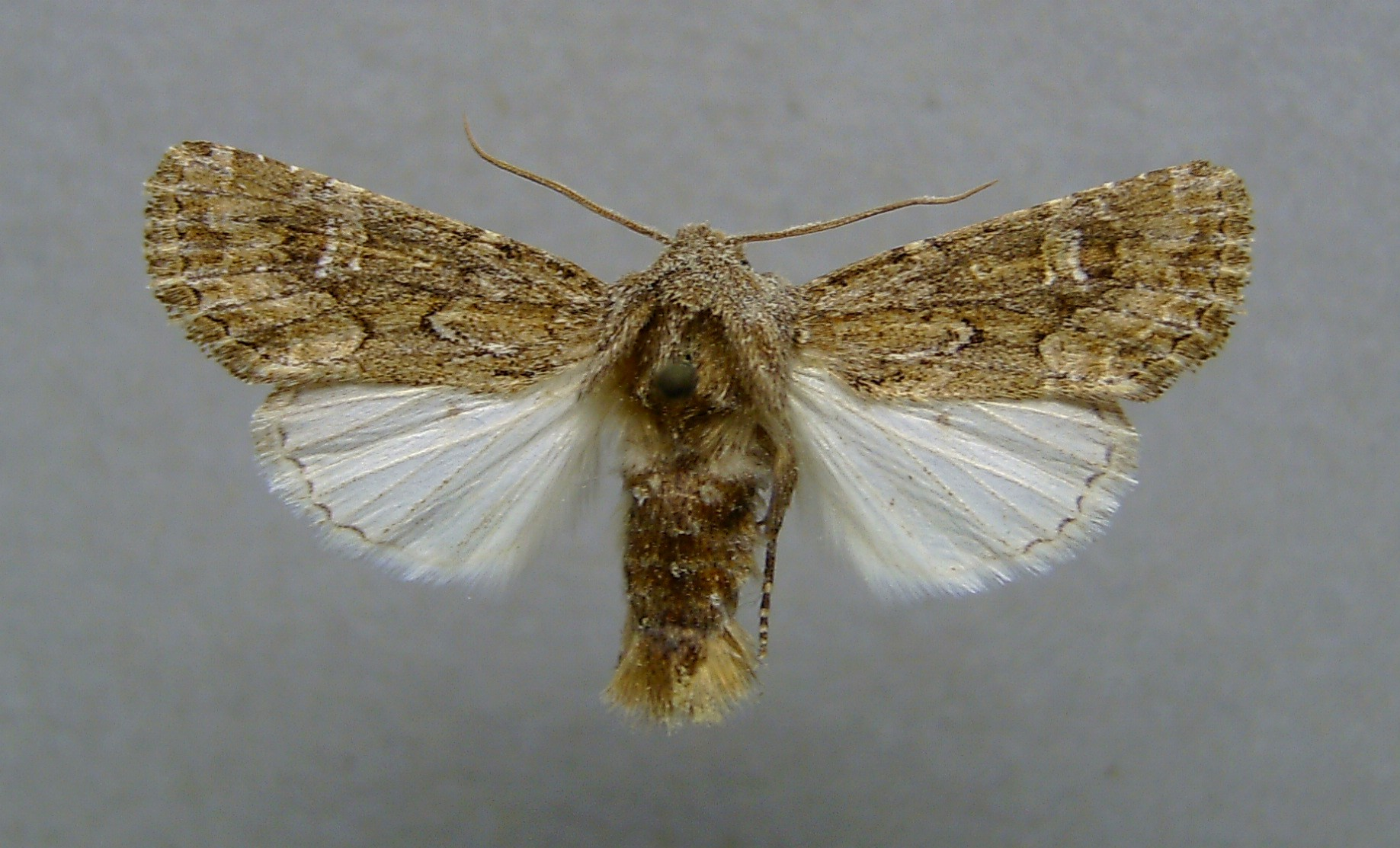

Scientific classification
- Domain: Eukaryota
- Kingdom: Animalia
- Phylum: Arthropoda
- Class: Insecta
- Order: Lepidoptera
- Superfamily: Noctuoidea
- Family: Noctuidae
- Genus: Luperina
- Species: L. nickerlii

Binomial name
- Luperina nickerlii (Freyer, 1845)

= Sandhill rustic =

Species of moth

The sandhill rustic (Luperina nickerlii) is a noctuid moth found in various parts of western, southern and central Europe with several subspecies. The species was first described by Christian Friedrich Freyer in 1845.

== Technical description and variation ==
It is like Luperina testacea, but olive grey, without any rufous tinge; inner and outer lines conversely edged with whitish; a blackish shade before inner line from median vein to inner margin, interrupted at vein 1; claviform stigma broadly blackish; orbicular a minute white spot; reniform subquadrate, with fuscous centre and broad white annulus, the area beyond it blackish, submarginal line whiter, preceded, except between veins 6 and 7, by a blackish shade; a row of neat black marginal lunules; fringe dark grey pencilled with light grey; hindwing pure white, with dark marginal lunules and white fringe; the veins dark. Certain separation requires examination of the genitalia.

== The sandhill rustic in Britain ==
In Britain, it flies in one generation between late July and late September and is represented by three subspecies:

=== Subspecies demuthi ===
Found on the coasts of Kent, Essex and Suffolk

=== Subspecies gueneei ===
Found in coastal sandhills in North Wales and Lancashire

=== Subspecies leechi ===
Subspecies leechi, is found on Loe Bar, Cornwall, the shingle beach which separates Loe Pool from the sea. Two pupae, found in the sand, by Barry Goater and Michael Leech in September 1974 was the first sign of this previously unknown subspecies. The female moth is reluctant to fly and rarely appears at light; behaviour that has presumably evolved as an adaptation to its windswept habitat. With only one known population ssp. leechi is a Biodiversity Action Plan species, is listed in the Red Data Book and a species account is given in the Cornish RDB.

Also see Luperina nickerlii knilli Boursin, 1964

== Biology ==
The larvae feed on the stem and roots of sand couch (Elytrigia juncea) from September to the following July.

== The sandhill rustic in Ireland ==
In Ireland, the sandhill rustic is represented by the subspecies knilli, which occurs only in County Kerry.
