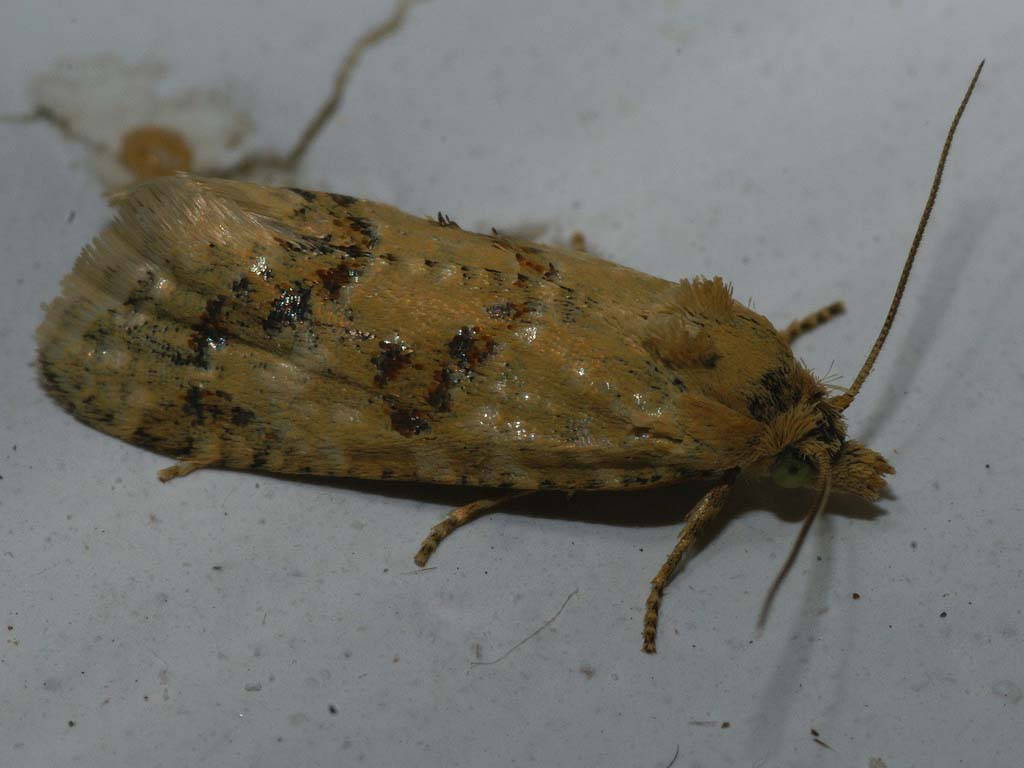

Scientific classification
- Kingdom: Animalia
- Phylum: Arthropoda
- Clade: Pancrustacea
- Class: Insecta
- Order: Lepidoptera
- Family: Tortricidae
- Genus: Aethes
- Species: A. williana

Binomial name
- Aethes williana (Brahm, 1791)

Synonyms
- Phalaena (Tortrix) williana Brahm, 1791; Phalonia costignata Filipjev, 1926; Cochylis dubrisana Curtis, 1834; Argyrolepia loriculana Guenée, in Lucas, 1849; Eupoecilia luteolana Stephens, 1834; Cochylis marmoratana Curtis, 1834; Argyrolepia virginana Guenée, 1845; Coccyx zephyrana Treitschke, 1830

= Aethes williana =

Silver carrot conch

Species of moth

Aethes williana, the silver carrot conch, is a species of moth of the family Tortricidae. It was described by Nikolaus Joseph Brahm in 1791. It is found in most of Europe, Trans-Caspia, Asia Minor, Mongolia, north-western Africa and Iran. It is found in dry, sandy and chalky habitats.

The wingspan is 13–17 millimetres (0.51–0.67 in). Adults are on wing from May to early August.

The larvae feed on Daucus carota, Helichrysum arenarium, Helichrysum stoechas, Eryngium campestre, Eryngium maritimum, Gnaphalium species and Ferula communis. Larvae can be found in May and June.
