= Cobalos =

Scientific classification
- Domain: Eukaryota
- Kingdom: Animalia
- Phylum: Arthropoda
- Class: Insecta
- Order: Lepidoptera
- Superfamily: Noctuoidea
- Family: Noctuidae
- Tribe: Apameini
- Genus: Cobalos; Smith, 1899

Genus of moths

Cobalos is a genus of moths of the family Noctuidae.

== Species ==
- Cobalos angelicus Smith, 1899
- Cobalos franciscanus Smith, 1899
