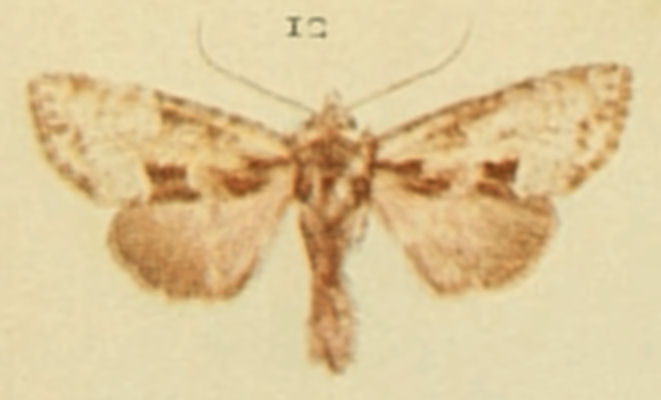

Scientific classification
- Domain: Eukaryota
- Kingdom: Animalia
- Phylum: Arthropoda
- Class: Insecta
- Order: Lepidoptera
- Superfamily: Noctuoidea
- Family: Noctuidae
- Genus: Eremobina
- Species: E. pabulatricula

Binomial name
- Eremobina pabulatricula (Brahm, 1791)

Synonyms
- Noctua pabulatricula Brahm, 1791; Phalaena Noctua connexa Borkhausen, 1792; Noctua elota Hübner, 1813; Hadena fraudulenta Staudinger, 1888; Pabulatrix pabulatricula (Brahm, 1791)

= Eremobina pabulatricula =

Species of moth

Eremobina pabulatricula, the union rustic, is a moth of the family Noctuidae. The species was first described by Nikolaus Joseph Brahm in 1791. It is found in continental Europe, southern Scandinavia and Central Asia. Never common in the British Isles, it has not been recorded there since 1935.

The wingspan is 28–34 mm. The moth flies in June and July.

The larvae feed on grasses.
