= Cobalos angelicus =

Scientific classification
- Domain: Eukaryota
- Kingdom: Animalia
- Phylum: Arthropoda
- Class: Insecta
- Order: Lepidoptera
- Superfamily: Noctuoidea
- Family: Noctuidae
- Tribe: Apameini
- Genus: Cobalos
- Species: C. angelicus

Binomial name
- Cobalos angelicus Smith, 1899

Species of moth

Cobalos angelicus is a species of cutworm or dart moth in the family Noctuidae. It is found in North America.

The MONA or Hodges number for Cobalos angelicus is 9423.
