= Aliona =

Scientific classification
- Kingdom: Animalia
- Phylum: Arthropoda
- Clade: Pancrustacea
- Class: Insecta
- Order: Lepidoptera
- Superfamily: Noctuoidea
- Family: Noctuidae
- Subfamily: Noctuinae
- Tribe: Apameini
- Genus: Aliona; Gyulai, Saldaitis & Zilli, 2019
- Species: A. alena

Binomial name
- Aliona alena Gyulai, Saldaitis & Zilli, 2019

Genus of moths

Aliona alena is a moth in the family Noctuidae and the only species in the monotypic genus Aliona. It is found in China.

== Etymology ==
The genus name was originally proposed as Alena Gyulai, Saldaitis & Zilli, 2019 but due to the existence of a senior homonym with another insect genus (for a snakefly), this moth genus was given a replacement name.
