= Dypterygia nicea =

Scientific classification
- Domain: Eukaryota
- Kingdom: Animalia
- Phylum: Arthropoda
- Class: Insecta
- Order: Lepidoptera
- Superfamily: Noctuoidea
- Family: Noctuidae
- Genus: Dypterygia
- Species: D. nicea

Binomial name
- Dypterygia nicea (Swinhoe, 1901)

Synonyms
- Xanthoptera nicea Swinhoe, 1901

Species of moth

Dypterygia nicea is a species of moth in the family Noctuidae. It was described by Charles Swinhoe in 1901 and can be found on the Andaman and Nicobar Islands.
