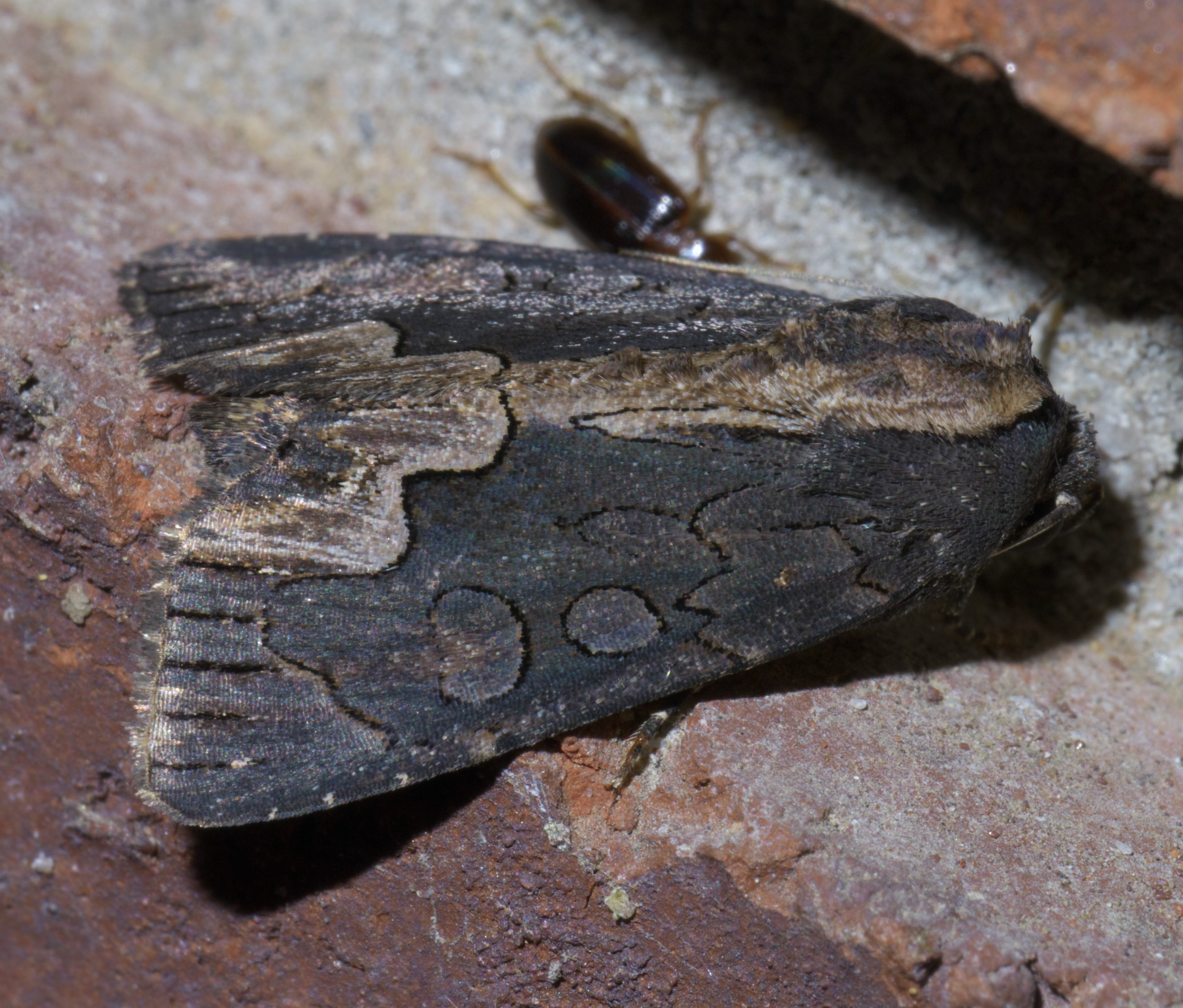

Scientific classification
- Domain: Eukaryota
- Kingdom: Animalia
- Phylum: Arthropoda
- Class: Insecta
- Order: Lepidoptera
- Superfamily: Noctuoidea
- Family: Noctuidae
- Tribe: Dypterygiini
- Genus: Dypterygia
- Species: D. rozmani

Binomial name
- Dypterygia rozmani Berio, 1974

= Dypterygia rozmani =

Species of moth

Dypterygia rozmani, or American bird's-wing, is a species of cutworm or dart moth in the family Noctuidae. It is found in North America.

The MONA or Hodges number for Dypterygia rozmani is 9560.
