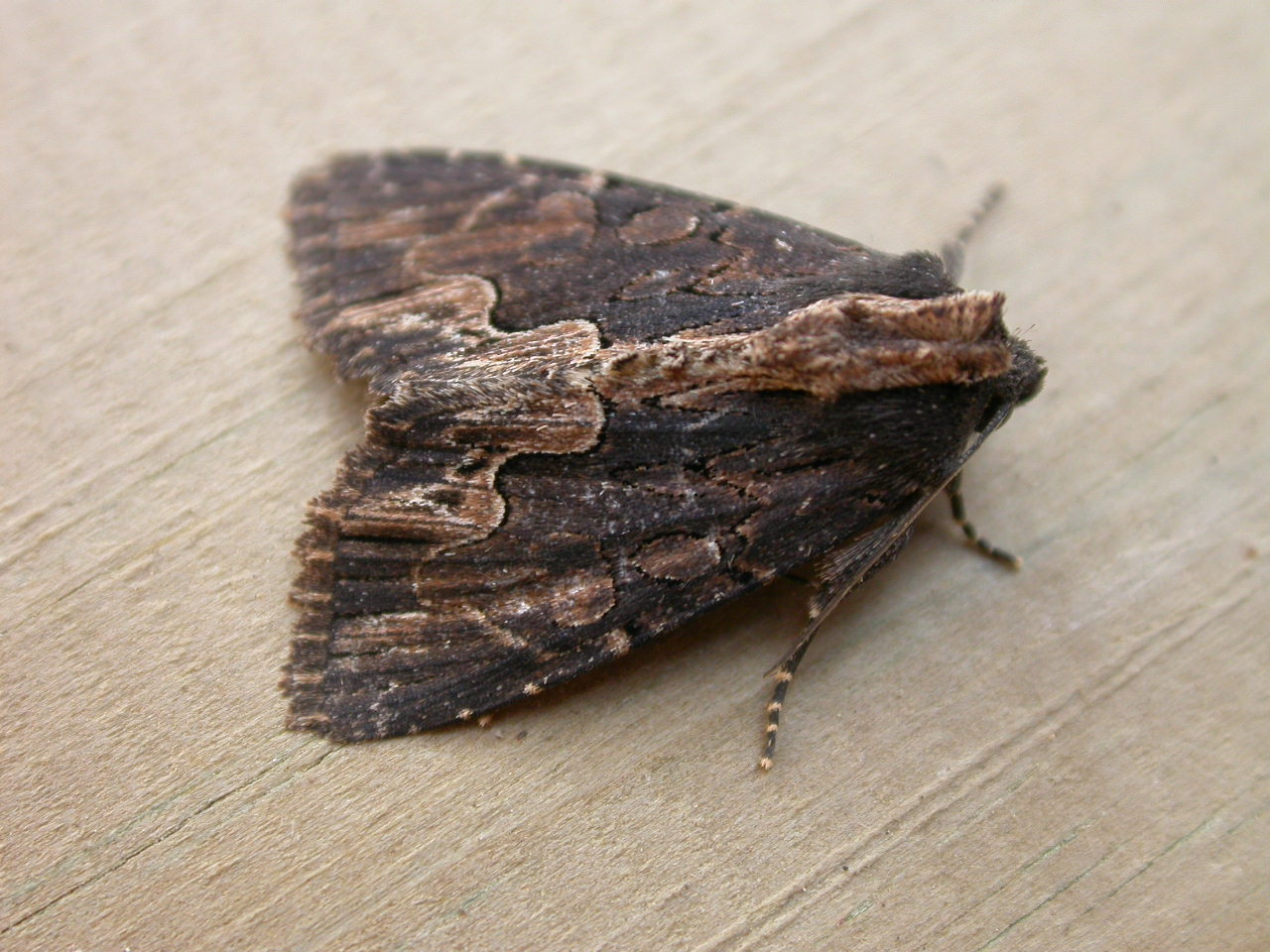
- Dypterygia scabriuscula

Scientific classification
- Domain: Eukaryota
- Kingdom: Animalia
- Phylum: Arthropoda
- Class: Insecta
- Order: Lepidoptera
- Superfamily: Noctuoidea
- Family: Noctuidae
- Tribe: Dypterygiini
- Genus: Dypterygia; Stephens, 1829

= Dypterygia =

Genus of moths

Dypterygia is a genus of moths of the family Noctuidae.

== Description ==
Its eyes are naked and without eyelashes. The proboscis is fully formed. Palpi upturned reaching above vertex of head, where the second joint with long hair below. Antennae minutely ciliated in male. Thorax with a long furrowed crest behind the collar. Abdomen with dorsal tufts on proximal segments. Tibia spineless.

== Species ==
- Dypterygia andreji (Kardakoff, 1928)
- Dypterygia assuetus (Butler, 1879)
- Dypterygia caliginosa (Walker, 1858)
- Dypterygia cristifera Hampson, 1893
- Dypterygia dolens (Druce, 1909)
- Dypterygia fuscocana Strand, 1920
- Dypterygia ligata (Möschler, 1891)
- Dypterygia lignaris (Schaus, 1898)
- Dypterygia multistriata Warren, 1912
- Dypterygia nicea (Swinhoe, 1901)
- Dypterygia ordinarius (Butler, 1879)
- Dypterygia pallida Dognin, 1907
- Dypterygia patina (Harvey, 1875)
- Dypterygia punctirena (Walker, 1857)
- Dypterygia rozmani Berio, 1974
- Dypterygia scabriuscula (Linnaeus, 1758)
- Dypterygia subfusca (Wileman, 1912)
