= Eremobina leucoscelis =

Scientific classification
- Domain: Eukaryota
- Kingdom: Animalia
- Phylum: Arthropoda
- Class: Insecta
- Order: Lepidoptera
- Superfamily: Noctuoidea
- Family: Noctuidae
- Genus: Eremobina
- Species: E. leucoscelis

Binomial name
- Eremobina leucoscelis (Grote, 1874)

Synonyms
- Eremobina fibulata (Morrison, 1874); Eremobina jocasta (Smith, 1900)

Species of moth

Eremobina leucoscelis is a species of cutworm or dart moth in the family Noctuidae. It is found in North America.

The MONA or Hodges number for Eremobina leucoscelis is 9398.
