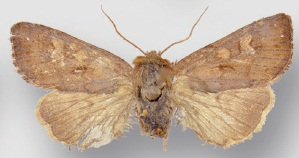
- Male

Scientific classification
- Domain: Eukaryota
- Kingdom: Animalia
- Phylum: Arthropoda
- Class: Insecta
- Order: Lepidoptera
- Superfamily: Noctuoidea
- Family: Noctuidae
- Genus: Resapamea
- Species: R. mammuthus

Binomial name
- Resapamea mammuthus Crabo, 2013

= Resapamea mammuthus =

Species of moth

Resapamea mammuthus is a moth in the family Noctuidae. It only known only from the type locality at Old Crow, Yukon Territory.

The length of the forewings is 21.5 mm for males. The forewings are a mixture of tan, orange-tan, gray-tan, light-gray, brown-gray, and gray scales, appearing medium-dark orange tan, grayer near anterior and posterior margins and darker gray-brown in the terminal area. The hindwings are light gray tan with gray suffusion, very faint postmedial line, marginal band, terminal line, veins, and chevron-shaped discal spot.

== Etymology ==
The name is derived from the genus of the woolly mammoth, Mammuthus, because its Beringian distribution and relatively large size for the genus.
