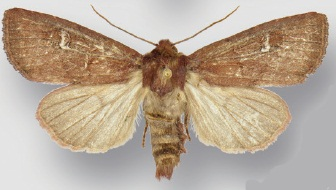
- Male

Scientific classification
- Domain: Eukaryota
- Kingdom: Animalia
- Phylum: Arthropoda
- Class: Insecta
- Order: Lepidoptera
- Superfamily: Noctuoidea
- Family: Noctuidae
- Genus: Resapamea
- Species: R. angelika

Binomial name
- Resapamea angelika Crabo, 2013

= Resapamea angelika =

Species of moth

Resapamea angelika is a moth in the family Noctuidae. It only known from the vicinity of Angel Lake in the East Humboldt Range of north-eastern Nevada. The habitat consists of sedge meadows along tributaries of Angel Creek.

The length of the forewings is 19 mm for males. The forewings are a mixture of red-brown and gray-brown scales. The ground color appears even dark red brown, but minimally darker in basal, medial and terminal areas. The dorsal hindwings are light gray orange to light fuscous, minimally darker and grayer on the distal half. Adults are on wing from late July to early August.

The larvae probably feed on Iris species.

== Etymology ==
The name is derived from the type locality at Angel Lake, Nevada.
