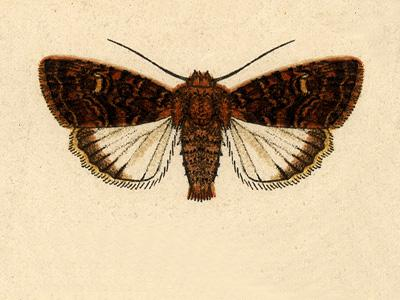

Scientific classification
- Kingdom: Animalia
- Phylum: Arthropoda
- Class: Insecta
- Order: Lepidoptera
- Superfamily: Noctuoidea
- Family: Noctuidae
- Genus: Dypterygia
- Species: D. punctirena

Binomial name
- Dypterygia punctirena (Walker, 1857)

Synonyms
- Hadena punctirena Walker, 1857; Perigea punctirena; Platysenta punctirena; Hadena praecellens Moeschler 1886

= Dypterygia punctirena =

Species of moth

Dypterygia punctirena is a moth of the family Noctuidae. It is found on Hispaniola, Jamaica and Puerto Rico and has also been reported from Florida.

The wingspan is about 35 mm.
