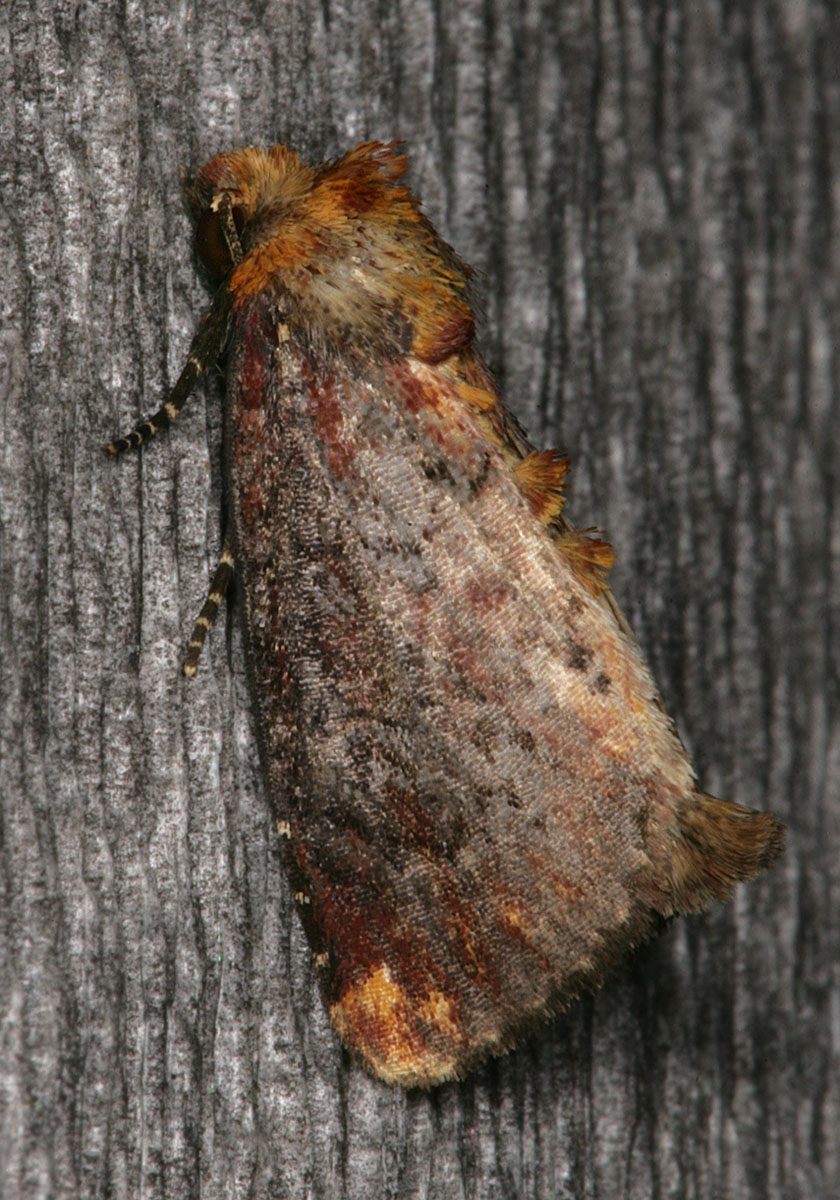
- Elder shoot borer moth, Achatodes zeae

Scientific classification
- Domain: Eukaryota
- Kingdom: Animalia
- Phylum: Arthropoda
- Class: Insecta
- Order: Lepidoptera
- Superfamily: Noctuoidea
- Family: Noctuidae
- Tribe: Apameini
- Genus: Achatodes; Guenée, 1852

= Achatodes =

Genus of moths

Achatodes is a genus of moths of the family Noctuidae.

== Species ==
- Achatodes juanae Schaus, 1894
- Achatodes zeae (Harris, 1841) – elder shoot borer moth
