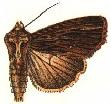

Scientific classification
- Domain: Eukaryota
- Kingdom: Animalia
- Phylum: Arthropoda
- Class: Insecta
- Order: Lepidoptera
- Superfamily: Noctuoidea
- Family: Noctuidae
- Genus: Dypterygia
- Species: D. lignaris

Binomial name
- Dypterygia lignaris (Schaus, 1898)

Synonyms
- Hadena lignaris Schaus, 1898

= Dypterygia lignaris =

Species of moth

Dypterygia lignaris is a moth of the family Noctuidae. It is found in South America, including Costa Rica and Colombia.
