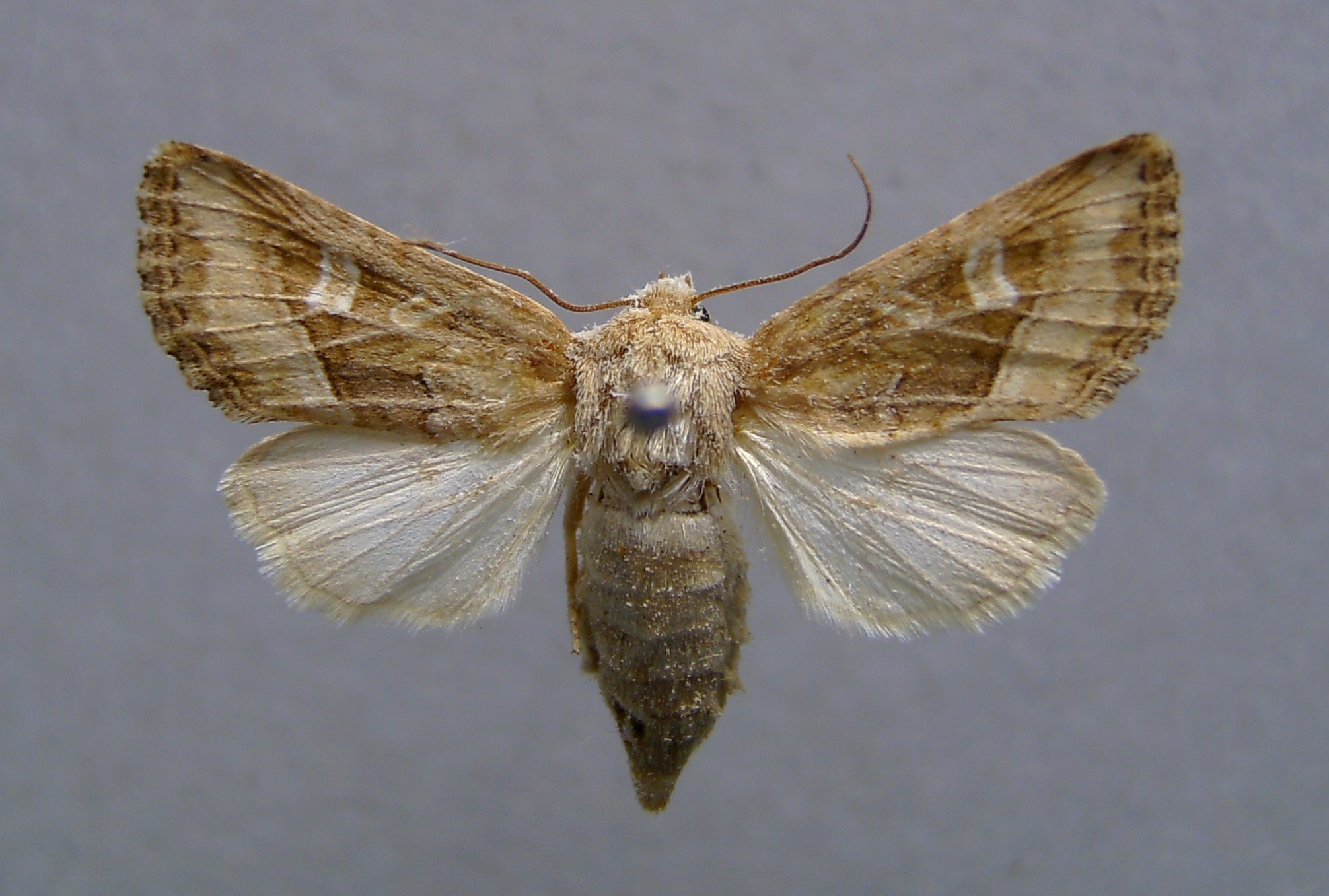
- Female

Scientific classification
- Domain: Eukaryota
- Kingdom: Animalia
- Phylum: Arthropoda
- Class: Insecta
- Order: Lepidoptera
- Superfamily: Noctuoidea
- Family: Noctuidae
- Genus: Luperina
- Species: L. dumerilii

Binomial name
- Luperina dumerilii (Duponchel, 1826)

Synonyms
- Noctua dumerilii Duponchel, 1826; Luperina desyllesi Boisduval, 1840; Hadena amenata Germar, [1842]; Apamea dumerilii var. sancta Staudinger, [1892]; Apamea dumerilii ab. armoricana Culot, 1909; Apamea dumerilii ab. aequalis Schawerda, 1911; Luperina dumerilii var. adriatica Stauder, 1913; Apamea dumerilii hirsuta Wagner, 1931; Episema indistincta Rebel, 1933

= Luperina dumerilii =

Species of moth

Luperina dumerilii, or Dumeril's rustic, is a moth of the family Noctuidae. The species was first described by Philogène Auguste Joseph Duponchel in 1826. It is found in the Mediterranean region and warmer areas of central and south-eastern Europe. Strays have been recorded from southern England. It is also present in Turkey and Jordan.

== Technical description and variation ==
L. dumerilii Dup. (= amentata Germ.) (43 d). Forewing whitish ochreous, generally with a pinkish or rufous tinge; the median and terminal areas, a costal patch before submarginal line, and generally the basal area olive brown; inner and outer lines double, dark filled in with ochreous; median vein and veinlets whitish: claviform stigma minute, brown edged, or absent; orbicular and reniform filled in with whitish, with pale brown centres; space between outer and submarginal lines of the pale ground colour, or slightly tinged with olive brown; submarginal line indicated by the dark terminal area, generally also preceded by a pale brown line; fringe chequered, brown and pale; hindwing white, tinged with grey in dark females; — ab. sancta Stgr. (43 d) from Palestine and Sicdy, is smaller, darker, with the upper stigmata snow white: the hindwing with a dark cellspot on the underside; a female from Ficuzza, Sicily certainly belongs here; — ab. diversa Stgr. [ now full species Luperina diversa (Staudinger, [1892]) ] (43 d), from Asia Minor and Armenia, is paler, somewhat larger, with the markings more diffuse; — ab. uniformis ab. nov. (= ab. A. Guen., desyllesi Stgr. nec Bsd.) (43 d) is wholly brownish fuscous; the lines hardly visible except at costa; all 3 stigmata edged with black; the two upper with pale annuli; hindwing white, with a dark cellspot on the underside, as in sancta Guen.; — Guenee's example was from Lyons; the one described above, a male, from Ficuzza, Sicily. The wingspan is 29–36 mm.

== Biology ==
There is one generation per year with adults on wing from August to November.

The larvae feed on the roots of various grasses. The species overwinters in the larval stage. Pupation takes place in July underground.

== Subspecies ==
- Luperina dumerilii dumerilii
- Luperina dumerilii hartigi Ronkay & Varga, 1985 (Sardinia)
- Luperina dumerilii hirsuta (Wagner, 1831) (Turkey)
- Luperina dumerilii sancta (Staudinger, 1891) (Jordan)
