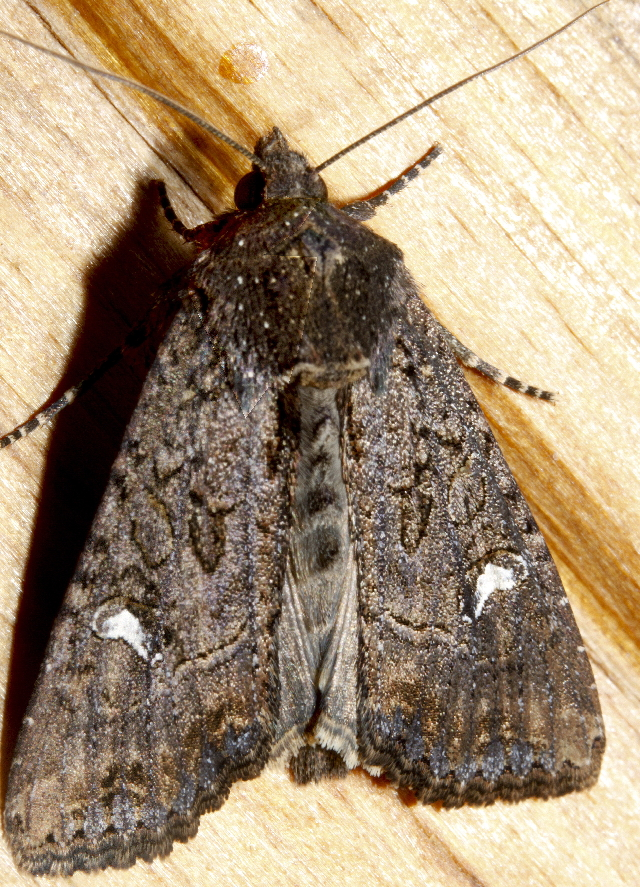

Scientific classification
- Domain: Eukaryota
- Kingdom: Animalia
- Phylum: Arthropoda
- Class: Insecta
- Order: Lepidoptera
- Superfamily: Noctuoidea
- Family: Noctuidae
- Genus: Helotropha
- Species: H. reniformis

Binomial name
- Helotropha reniformis (Grote, 1874)

= Helotropha reniformis =

Species of moth

Helotropha reniformis, the reniform celaena, is a species of moth in the family Noctuidae (owlet moths). The species was described by Augustus Radcliffe Grote in 1874. It is found in North America.

The MONA or Hodges number for Helotropha reniformis is 9453.
