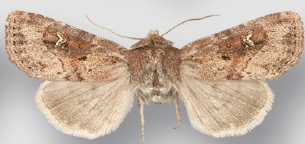
- Female
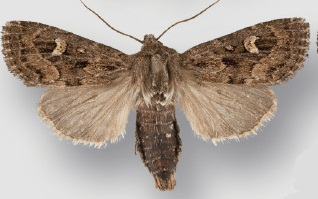
- Male

Scientific classification
- Domain: Eukaryota
- Kingdom: Animalia
- Phylum: Arthropoda
- Class: Insecta
- Order: Lepidoptera
- Superfamily: Noctuoidea
- Family: Noctuidae
- Genus: Resapamea
- Species: R. diluvius

Binomial name
- Resapamea diluvius Crabo, 2013

= Resapamea diluvius =

Species of moth

Resapamea diluvius is a moth in the family Noctuidae. It occurs in the Columbia Basin in Washington and northern Oregon. It is possibly also present in the dunes of northern Nevada and the northern Great Plains.

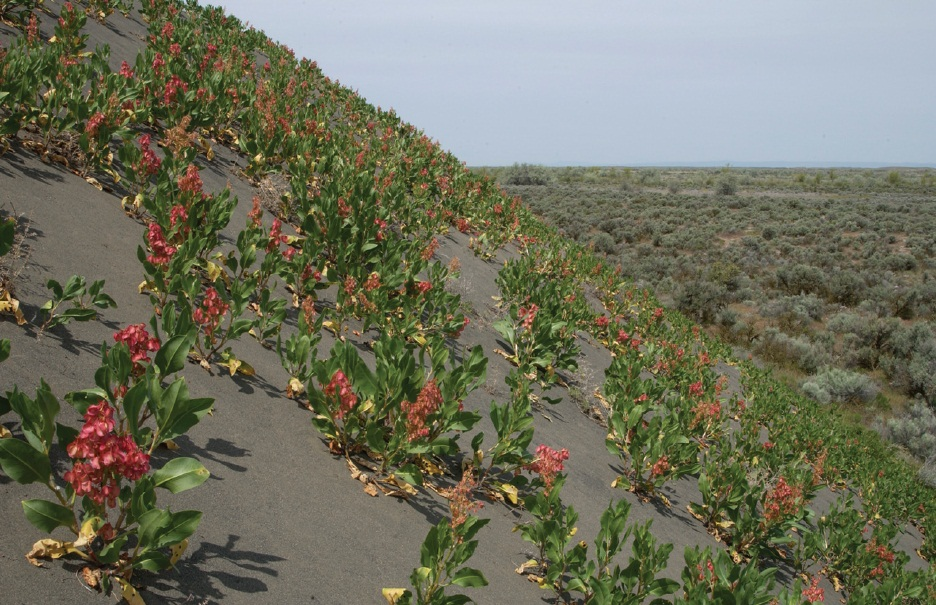
Habitat

The length of the forewings is 16–19 mm for males and 15–18 mm females. The forewings are a mixture of gray brown, gray tan, red brown, gray and blackish-gray scales. The ground color is medium-dark to dark gray brown or reddish-gray brown. The dorsal hindwing is slightly brownish gray, darker and grayer on the distal half, with a gray ill-defined oval discal spot and a thin terminal line. Adults are on wing from late April to early June.

The larvae probably feed on Rumex venosus.

== Etymology ==
The name is derived from the Latin diluvium (meaning deluge or flood). The Columbia Basin where this moth occurs in Washington was scoured repeatedly by cataclysmic floods at the end of the Ice Age.
