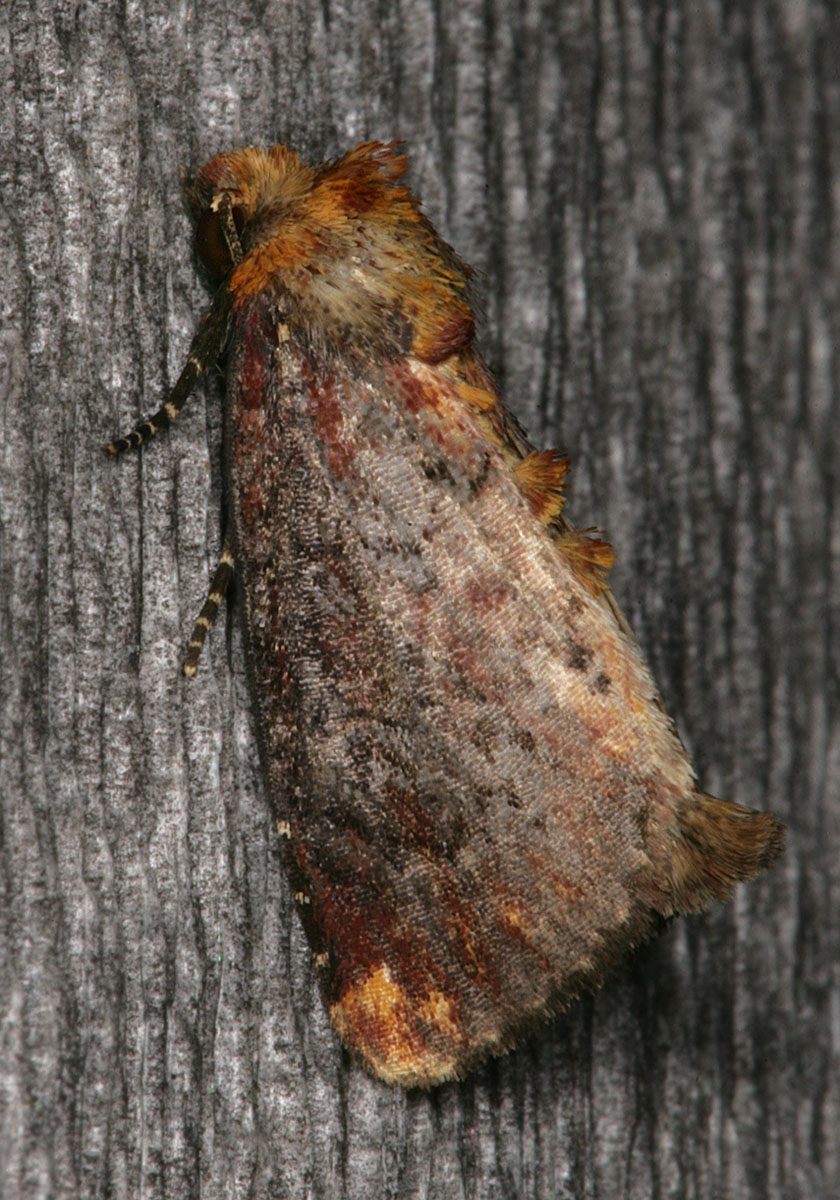

Scientific classification
- Kingdom: Animalia
- Phylum: Arthropoda
- Clade: Pancrustacea
- Class: Insecta
- Order: Lepidoptera
- Superfamily: Noctuoidea
- Family: Noctuidae
- Genus: Achatodes
- Species: A. zeae

Binomial name
- Achatodes zeae (Harris, 1841)

= Achatodes zeae =

Species of moth

The elder shoot borer moth (Achatodes zeae), or spindle worm, is a moth species of the family Noctuidae. The species has been known to taxonomists since at least 1841 but gained notoriety in 1927, when many of the species were found boring into the shoots of the common elder bush (Sambucus nigra) in Wisconsin, USA.

== Life Cycle ==
Adult moths are known to lay eggs in July and August, and eggs hatch approximately 9 months later. Larvae (spindle worms) feed on the leaves they hatch in before moving into lateral shoots of the bush. As they mature they move towards ground shoots and feed upward into the shoots until mid June when they are fully developed and begin to bore into dead canes to pupate.
