= Dypterygia assuetus =

Scientific classification
- Domain: Eukaryota
- Kingdom: Animalia
- Phylum: Arthropoda
- Class: Insecta
- Order: Lepidoptera
- Superfamily: Noctuoidea
- Family: Noctuidae
- Genus: Dypterygia
- Species: D. assuetus

Binomial name
- Dypterygia assuetus (Butler, 1879)

Synonyms
- Prometopus assuetus Butler, 1879; Dipterygia assueta

Species of moth

Dypterygia assuetus is a moth of the family Noctuidae. It is found in South America, including Costa Rica and Brazil.
