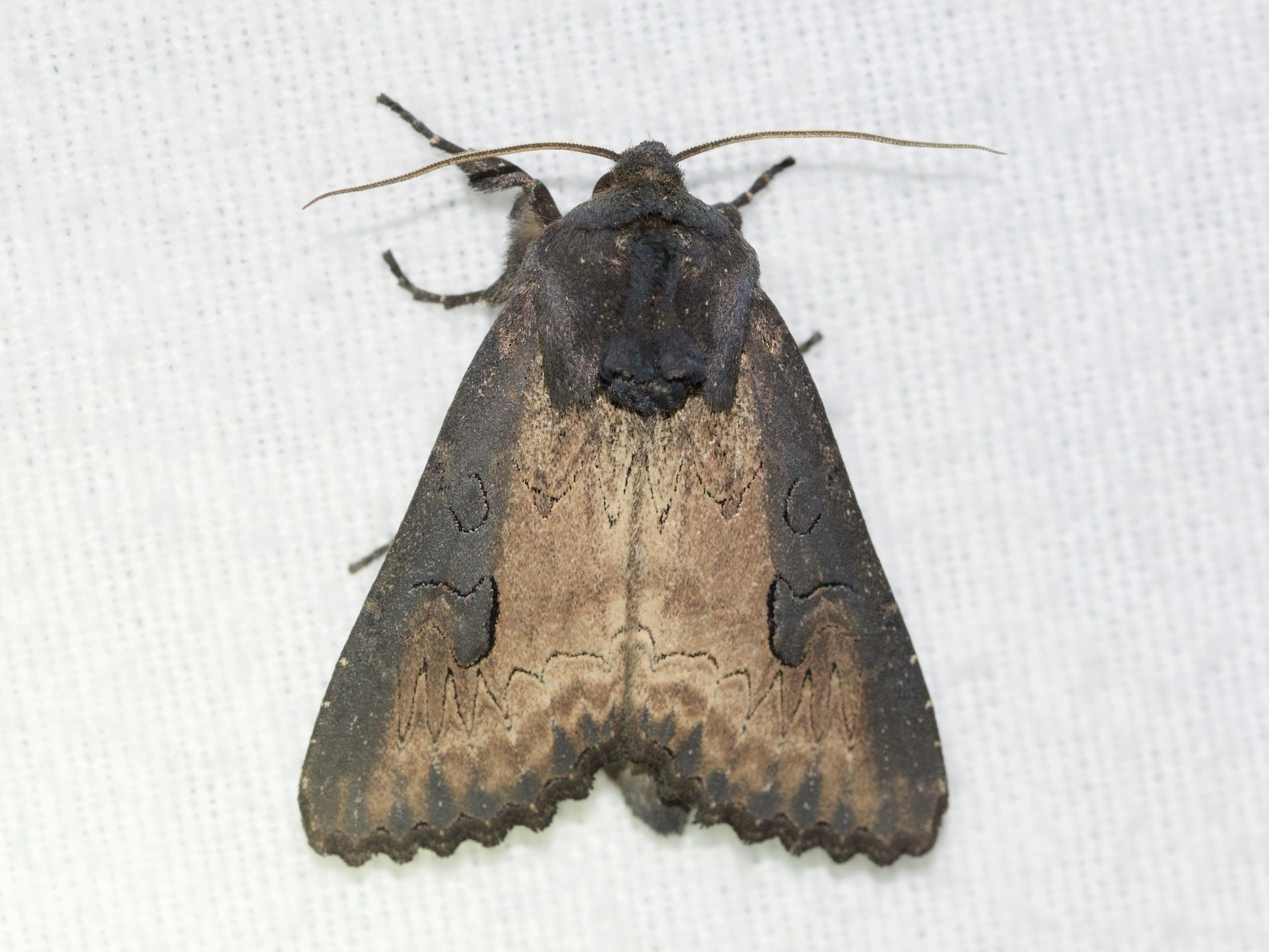

Scientific classification
- Kingdom: Animalia
- Phylum: Arthropoda
- Class: Insecta
- Order: Lepidoptera
- Superfamily: Noctuoidea
- Family: Noctuidae
- Genus: Macronoctua
- Species: M. onusta

Binomial name
- Macronoctua onusta Grote, 1874

= Macronoctua onusta =

Species of moth

Macronoctua onusta, commonly known as the iris borer, is a species of cutworm or dart moth in the family Noctuidae. It is found in North America.

== Description ==
Macronoctua onusta is a large brown and smoky dark gray moth (FW length 18–21 mm). It has a forewing that is broad with a scalloped outer margin and a black streak along the reniform spot. It is dull brown with broad smoky dark gray suffusion on the costa and in the cell as well as in the terminal area and fringe. The antemedial and postmedial lines are thin, dark gray. The antemedial line is drawn far lateral above the posterior margin. The median line is dark brown, strongly arched toward across the brown median area below the cell. The postmedial line is jaggedly zigzagged on the anterior wing and straight from Anterior cubitus vein to the posterior margin. The subterminal line is only evident as the transition from the brown subterminal area to the black terminal area. The terminal area is a black line. The three spots are outlined in thin black. The orbicular spot is a small oval. The reniform spot has a darker posterior outline which forms a straight black line below the cubital vein. It is large and asymmetrically kidney-shaped with the lower end curved toward the outer margin touching the postmedial line. A spike-like process extends toward the base from the posteromedial end. The claviform spot is small and elongate with a rounded end. The hindwing is dirty brown-gray with slightly darker discal spot and veins, and scalloped terminal line. The hindwing fringe is light gray with a brown base. The head and thorax are even smoky dark gray. The male antenna is broad and bead-like.

This species is easily identified by its large size, dark gray anterior and lateral margins, and the distinctively shaped reniform spot and postmedial line. Similar dark brown moths lack the dark posterior outline and spike from the medial reniform spot and the postmedial line with serrate anterior and straight posterior segments.

== Life history ==
- Larvae – This species is a foodplant specialist that bores into the rhizomes of irises (Iris spp.) in the Iridaceae.
- Adults – Adults fly in the fall, usually in September and October. It comes to lights, although not particularly well. Forbes (1954) comments that the moth is best obtained by rearing. It also lays its eggs in the fall; a single female can lay between 150 and 200 eggs over a period of several days.
