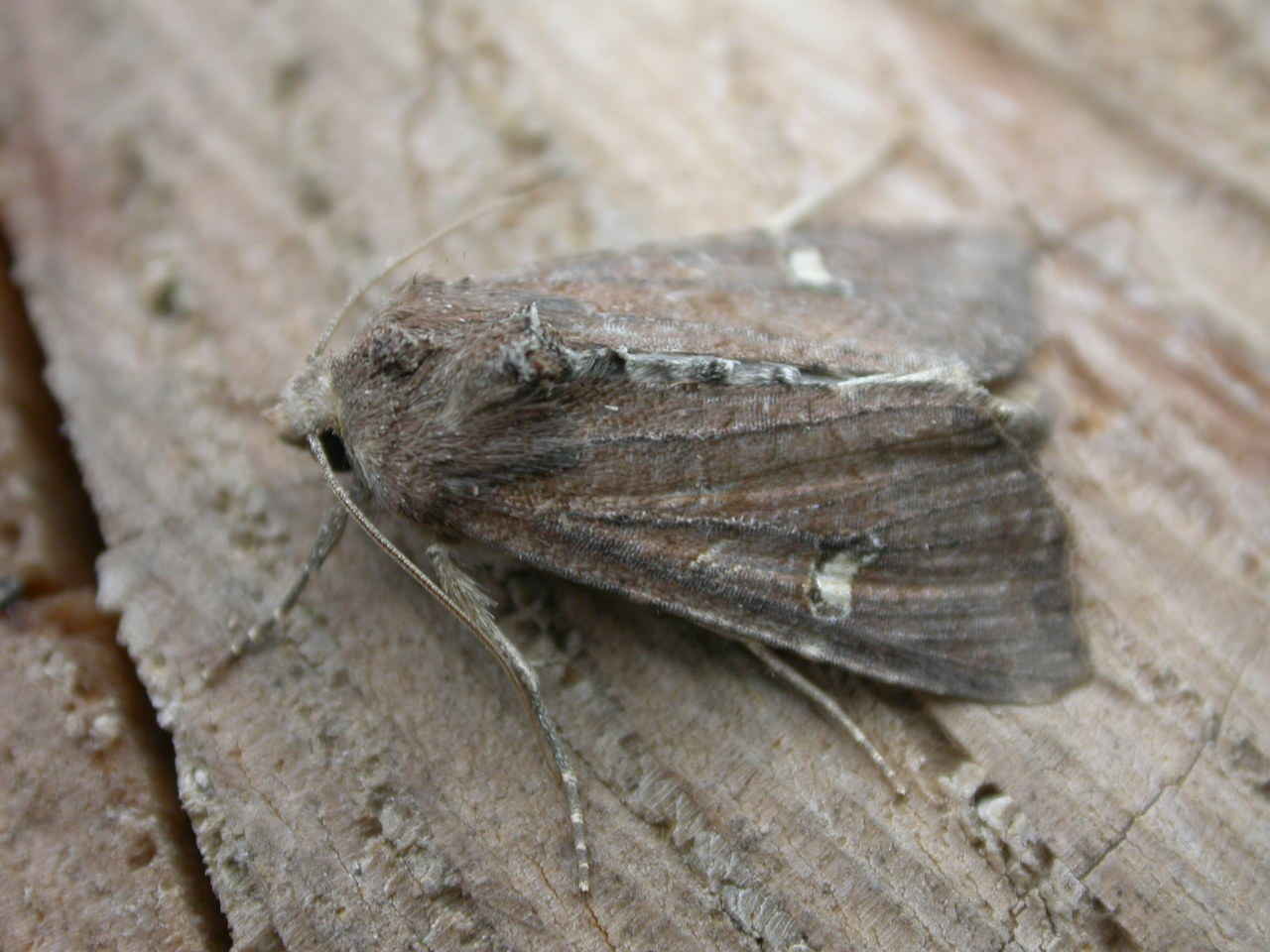

Scientific classification
- Kingdom: Animalia
- Phylum: Arthropoda
- Class: Insecta
- Order: Lepidoptera
- Superfamily: Noctuoidea
- Family: Noctuidae
- Genus: Helotropha
- Species: H. leucostigma

Binomial name
- Helotropha leucostigma (Hübner, 1808)

Synonyms
- Noctua leucostigma; Noctua fibrosa; Noctua lunina; Cerastis laevis; Gortyna leucostigma; Blepharidia yeterofuna; Celaena leucostigma

= Helotropha leucostigma =

Species of moth

Helotropha leucostigma, the crescent, formerly Celaena leucostigma is a moth of the family Noctuidae. It is found in the Palearctic realm (Europe, Russia, Armenia, Turkestan, Siberia, Russian Far East, Mongolia, Amur, Korea, Japan, and northeastern China).

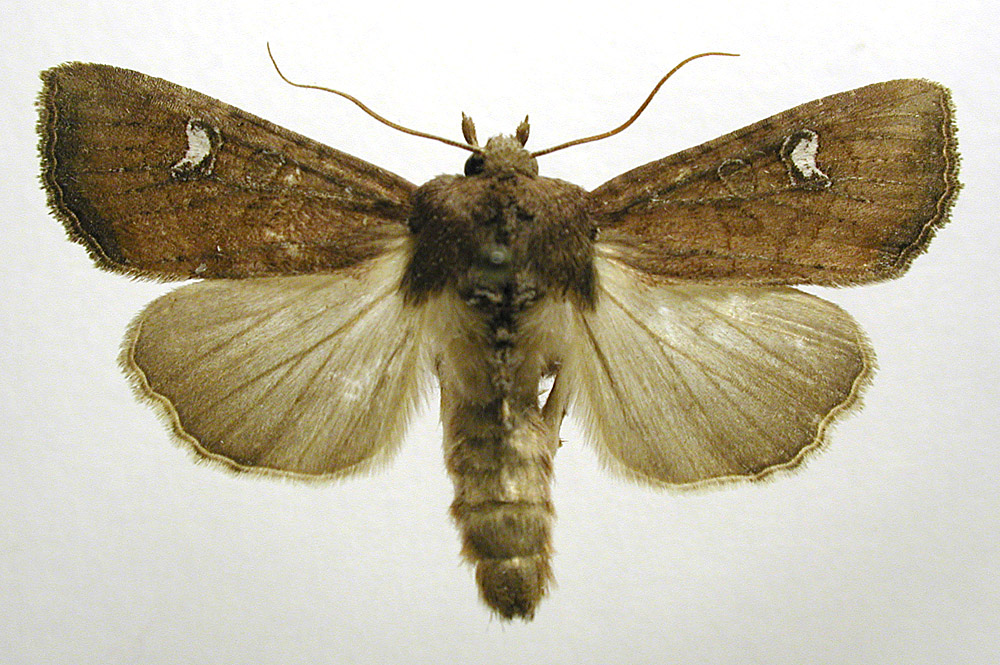
Mounted

== Technical description and variation ==
The wingspan is 37–44 millimetres (1.5–1.7 in). Forewing dull dark brown, faintly reddish- tinged; the veins powdered with grey scales; the terminal area beyond subterminal line black-brown, except at apex: median area between subcostal vein and vein 1 somewhat darker than the rest of wing; inner and outer lines indistinctly double: the inner outwardly oblique, the outer bent on vein 5; claviform stigma hardly visible; orbicular stigma oblique, elliptical, of the ground colour, with paler annulus; the reniform white or dull yellow, containing a double dark lunule with pale centre; the outer edge of this dark inner lunule is sometimes obsolete, in which case the stigma appears more solidly yellowish or white; the space between outer and subterminal lines is always slightly, often visibly, paler than the ground colour; hindwing fuscous grey; — in the ab. lunina Haw. the outer fascia is conspicuously paler, becoming pale brown or pinkish ochreous, the median vein and veins 3, 4 at their base are white, and both stigmata are more strongly marked; ab. albipuncta Tutt is comparatively a rare form, with nearly the whole reniform stigma snow-white; — fibrosa Hbn. represents a bright reddish fulvous form, which may exist, but which no one appears to have seen; — laevis Btlr. the Japanese form, is, as usual, larger than the European, and the outer line appears rather more strongly excurved beyond cell and incurved below.

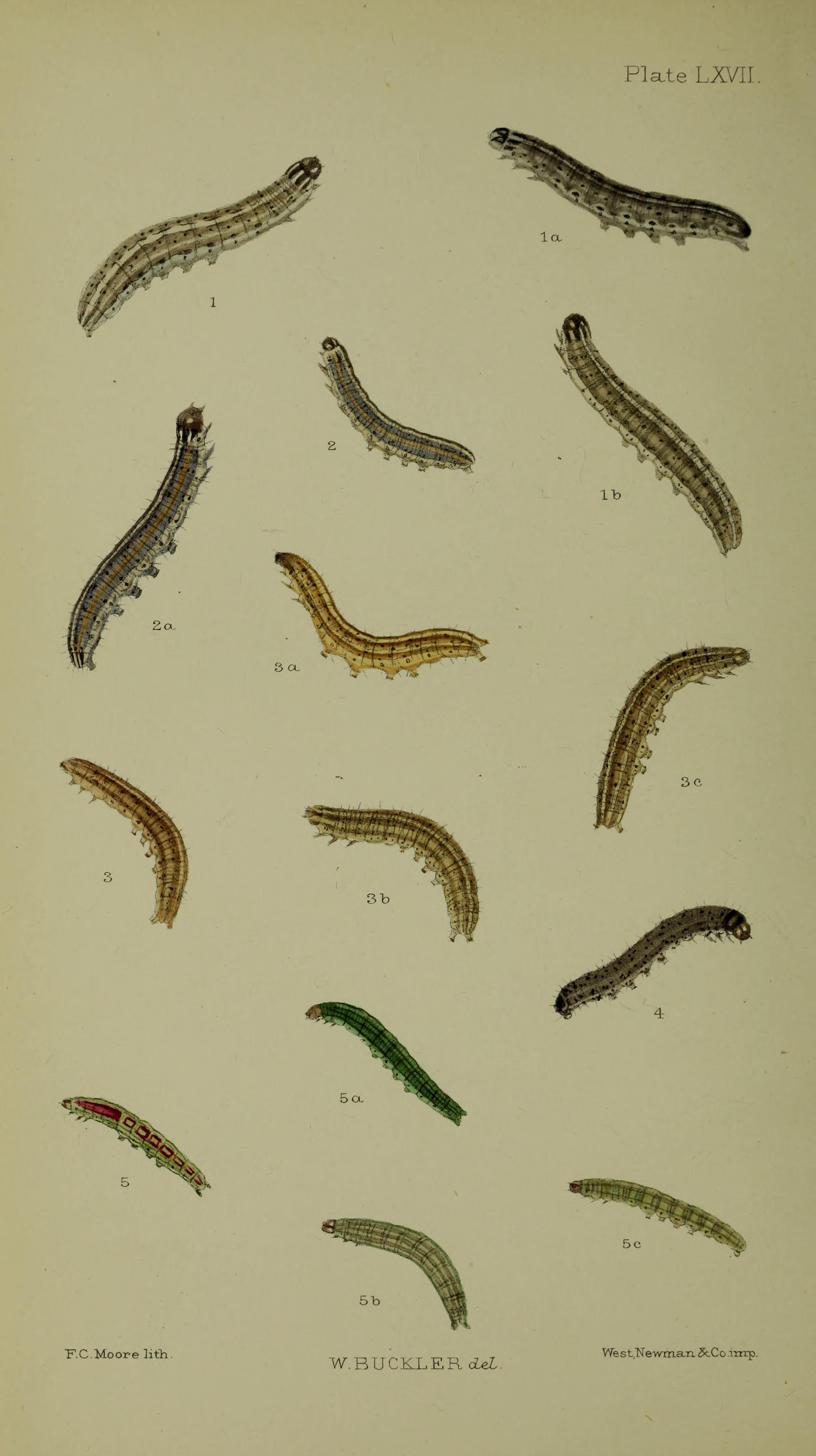
Fig. 4 larva after last moult

== Biology ==
The moth flies from June to October depending on location.

Larva blackish-brown; the dorsal and subdorsal lines somewhat paler; thoracic and anal plates blackish; head brown. The larvae feed on waterplants Iris pseudacorus and Cladium mariscus.
