= Dypterygia pallida =

Scientific classification
- Domain: Eukaryota
- Kingdom: Animalia
- Phylum: Arthropoda
- Class: Insecta
- Order: Lepidoptera
- Superfamily: Noctuoidea
- Family: Noctuidae
- Genus: Dypterygia
- Species: D. pallida

Binomial name
- Dypterygia pallida Dognin, 1907

Synonyms
- Dipterygia pallida Dognin, 1907

Species of moth

Dypterygia pallida is a moth of the family Noctuidae first described by Paul Dognin in 1907. It is found in French Guiana, Paraguay and Guadeloupe.
