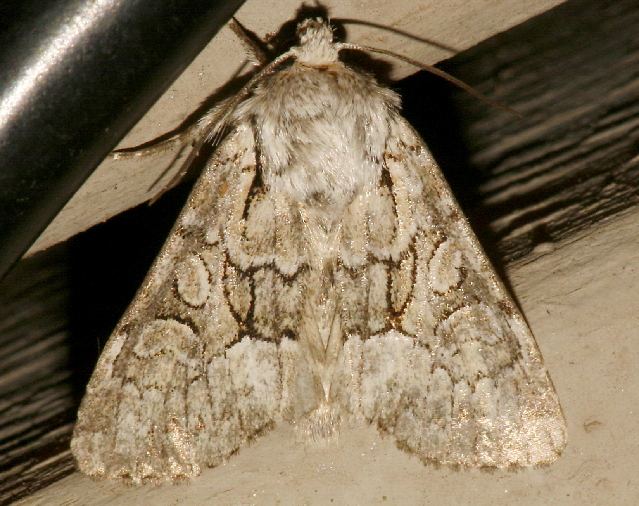
- Eremobina claudens

Scientific classification
- Domain: Eukaryota
- Kingdom: Animalia
- Phylum: Arthropoda
- Class: Insecta
- Order: Lepidoptera
- Superfamily: Noctuoidea
- Family: Noctuidae
- Tribe: Apameini
- Genus: Eremobina; McDunnough, 1937

= Eremobina =

Genus of moths

Eremobina is a genus of moths of the family Noctuidae erected by James Halliday McDunnough in 1937.

== Species ==
- Eremobina claudens (Walker, 1857) (syn: Eremobina albertina (Hampson, 1908), Eremobina hillii (Grote, 1876), Eremobina hanhami (Barnes & Benjamin, 1924)
- Eremobina leucoscelis (Grote, 1874) (syn: Eremobina jocasta (Smith, 1900), Eremobina fibulata (Morrison, 1874))
- Eremobina pabulatricula (Brahm, 1791)
- Eremobina unicincta (Smith, 1902)
