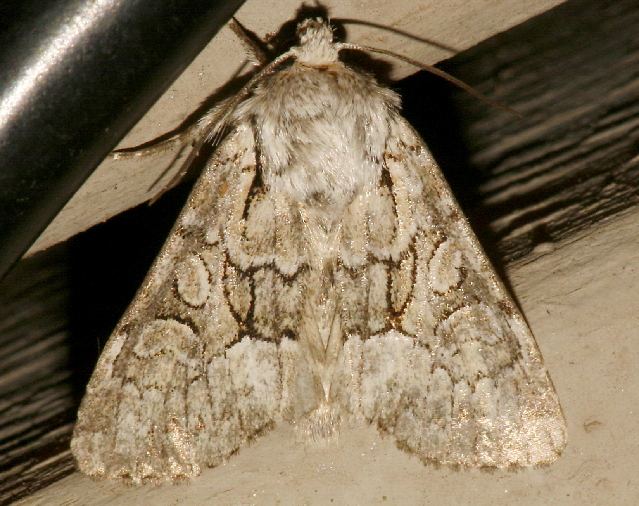

Scientific classification
- Domain: Eukaryota
- Kingdom: Animalia
- Phylum: Arthropoda
- Class: Insecta
- Order: Lepidoptera
- Superfamily: Noctuoidea
- Family: Noctuidae
- Genus: Eremobina
- Species: E. claudens

Binomial name
- Eremobina claudens (Walker, 1857)

Synonyms
- Eremobina albertina (Hampson, 1908); Eremobina hanhami (Barnes & Benjamin, 1924); Eremobina hilli (Grote, 1876)

= Eremobina claudens =

Species of moth

Eremobina claudens, the dark-winged Quaker or Alberta Quaker, is a species of cutworm or dart moth in the family Noctuidae. It was first described by Francis Walker in 1857 and it is found in North America.

The MONA or Hodges number for Eremobina claudens is 9396.
