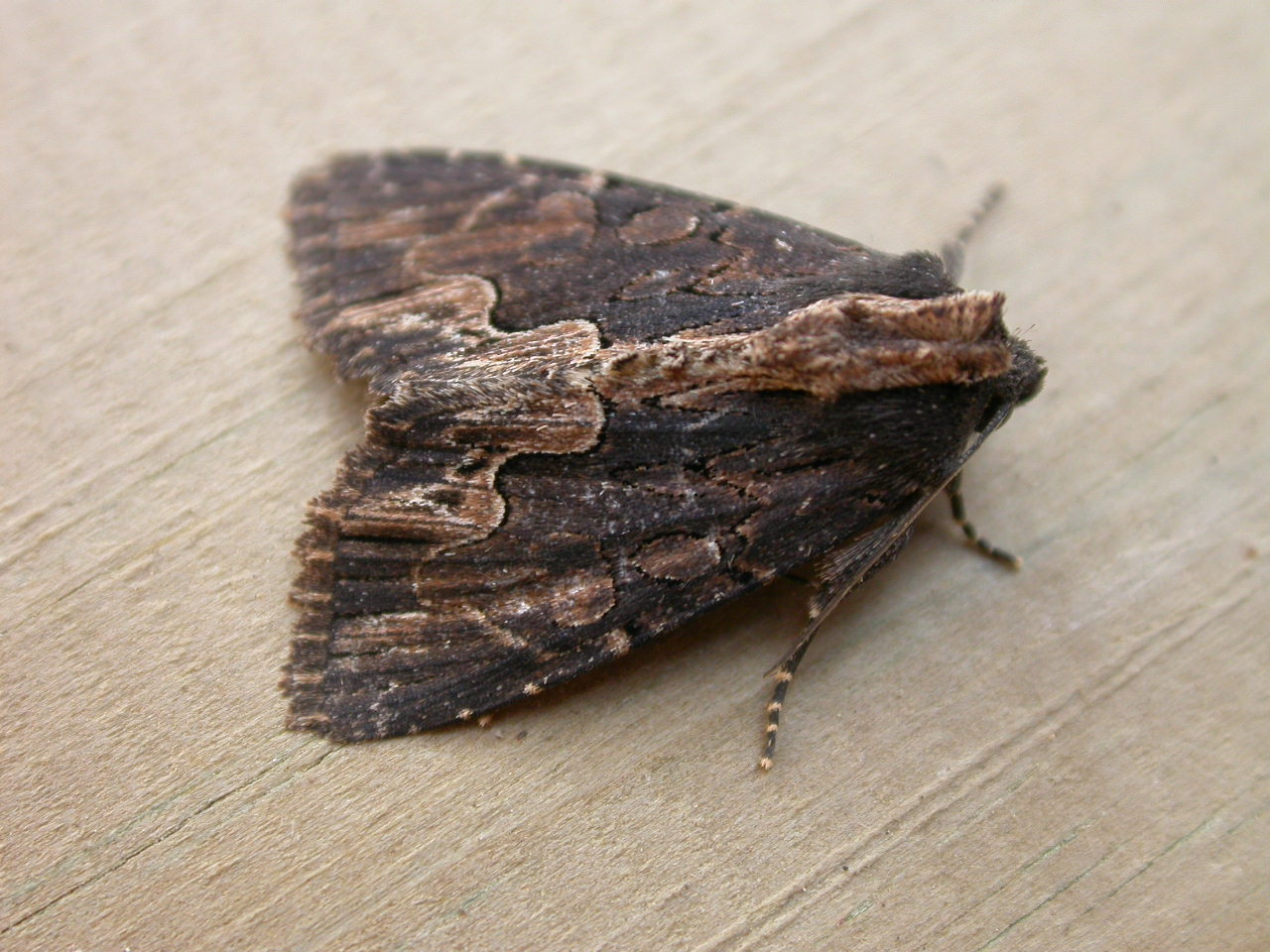

Scientific classification
- Kingdom: Animalia
- Phylum: Arthropoda
- Class: Insecta
- Order: Lepidoptera
- Superfamily: Noctuoidea
- Family: Noctuidae
- Genus: Dypterygia
- Species: D. scabriuscula

Binomial name
- Dypterygia scabriuscula (Linnaeus, 1758)

= Dypterygia scabriuscula =

Species of moth

Dypterygia scabriuscula, the bird’s wing, is a moth of the family Noctuidae. The species can be found in Europe and the western Palearctic (Asia Minor, Azerbaijan and Armenia).

== Technical description and variation ==
D. scabriuscula L. (= pinastri L., tripterygia Esp.) (38 f). Forewing brown black; the inner margin narrowly and the postmedian space below vein 3 whitish, with the veins and intervals marked with pale olive brown, often some pale brown suffusion also about vein 6; a fine black streak from base below cell;the lines and edges of stigmata black; inner line with 4 angles outwards, that below vein 1 long and acute; outer line oblique outwards to 5, forming a projection between 4 and 5, then insinuate to middle of inner margin: claviform stigma long and narrow; orbicular oval, flattened, sometimes touching the large reniform: terminal area with black streaks between veins; subterminal line visible only below vein 2, the anal angle beyond it blackish; hindwing fuscous. Larva redbrown, marbled and dotted with darker; dorsal line finely white with brown edge; lateral lines broadly pale, dark-edged above, crossed by a series of oblique brown stripes; head brown with black streaks. The wingspan is 32–37 mm.

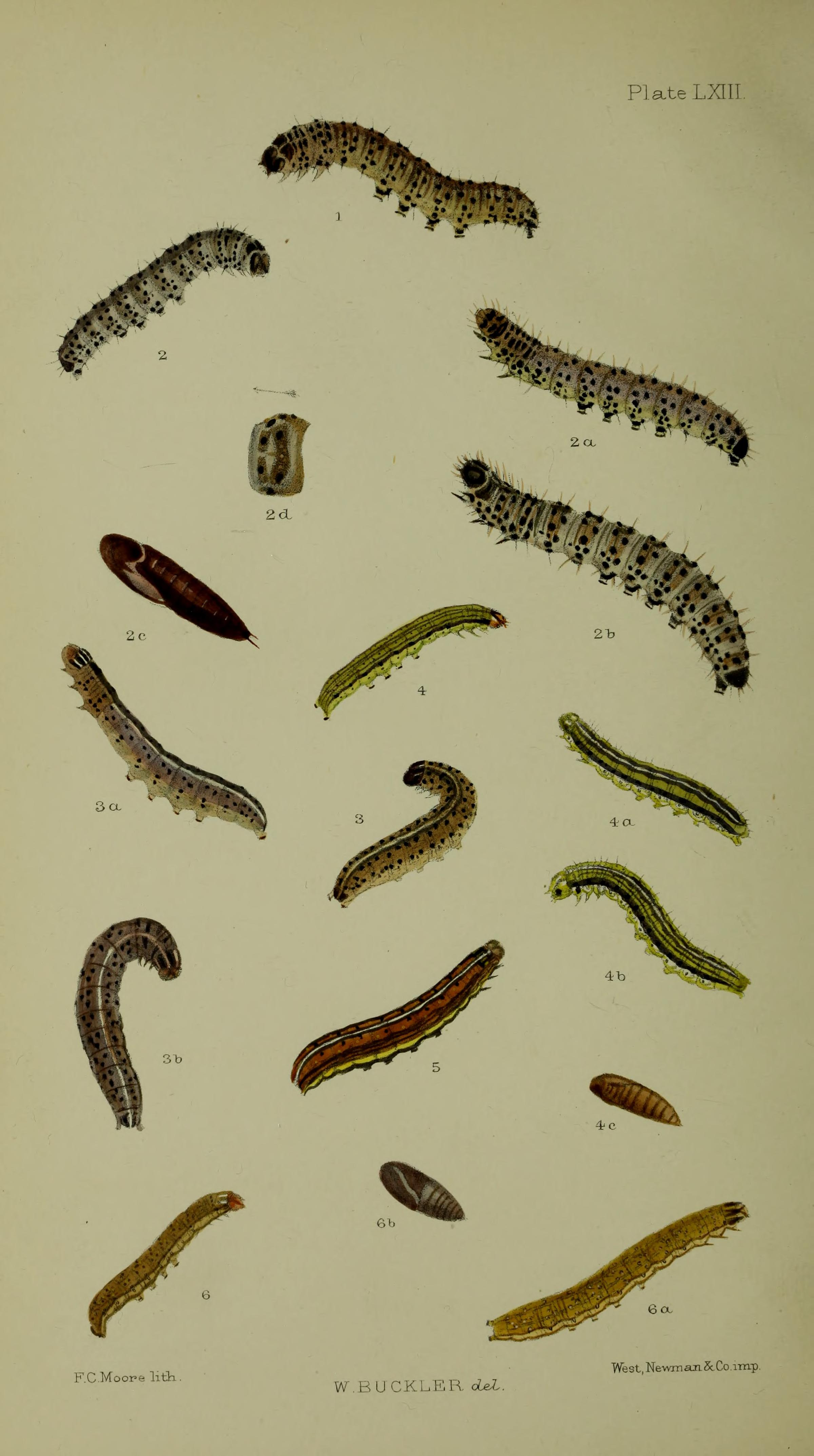
Fig 5 larva after last moult

== Biology ==
The moths flies from April to August depending on the location.

The caterpillars feed on Rumex and Polygonum aviculare.
