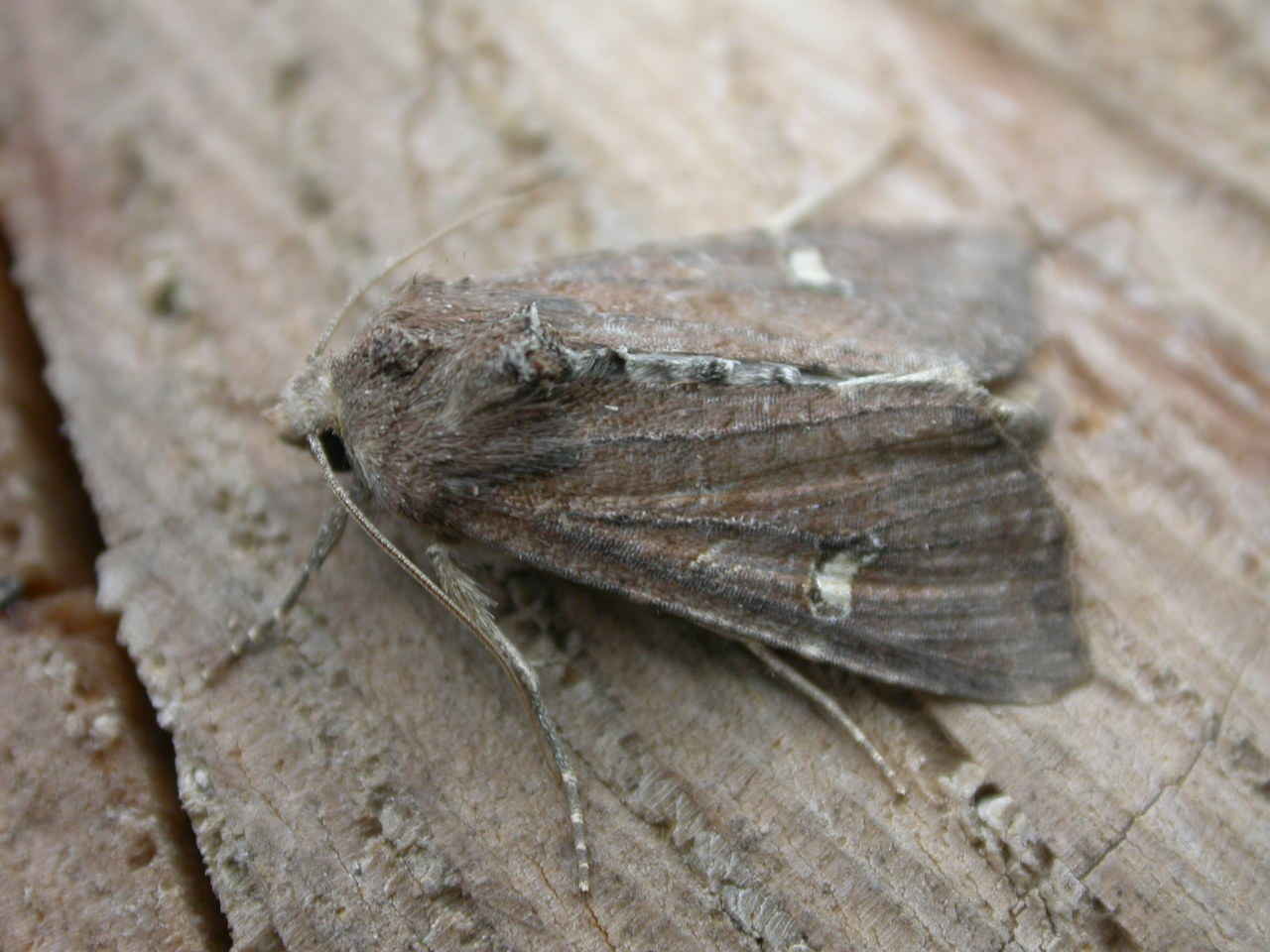

Scientific classification
- Kingdom: Animalia
- Phylum: Arthropoda
- Clade: Pancrustacea
- Class: Insecta
- Order: Lepidoptera
- Superfamily: Noctuoidea
- Family: Noctuidae
- Tribe: Apameini
- Genus: Helotropha; Lederer, 1857

= Helotropha =

Genus of moths

Helotropha is a genus of moths of the family Noctuidae.

== Species ==
- Helotropha leucostigma (Hübner, [1808])
- Helotropha reniformis (Grote, 1874)
