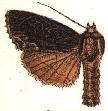

Scientific classification
- Kingdom: Animalia
- Phylum: Arthropoda
- Class: Insecta
- Order: Lepidoptera
- Superfamily: Noctuoidea
- Family: Noctuidae
- Genus: Dypterygia
- Species: D. caliginosa

Binomial name
- Dypterygia caliginosa (Walker, 1858)

Synonyms
- Hadena caliginosa Walker, 1858

= Dypterygia caliginosa =

Species of moth

Dypterygia caliginosa is a moth of the family Noctuidae. It is found in the Russian Far East, the Korean Peninsula and Japan.

The wingspan ranges from 38 to 45 mm.
