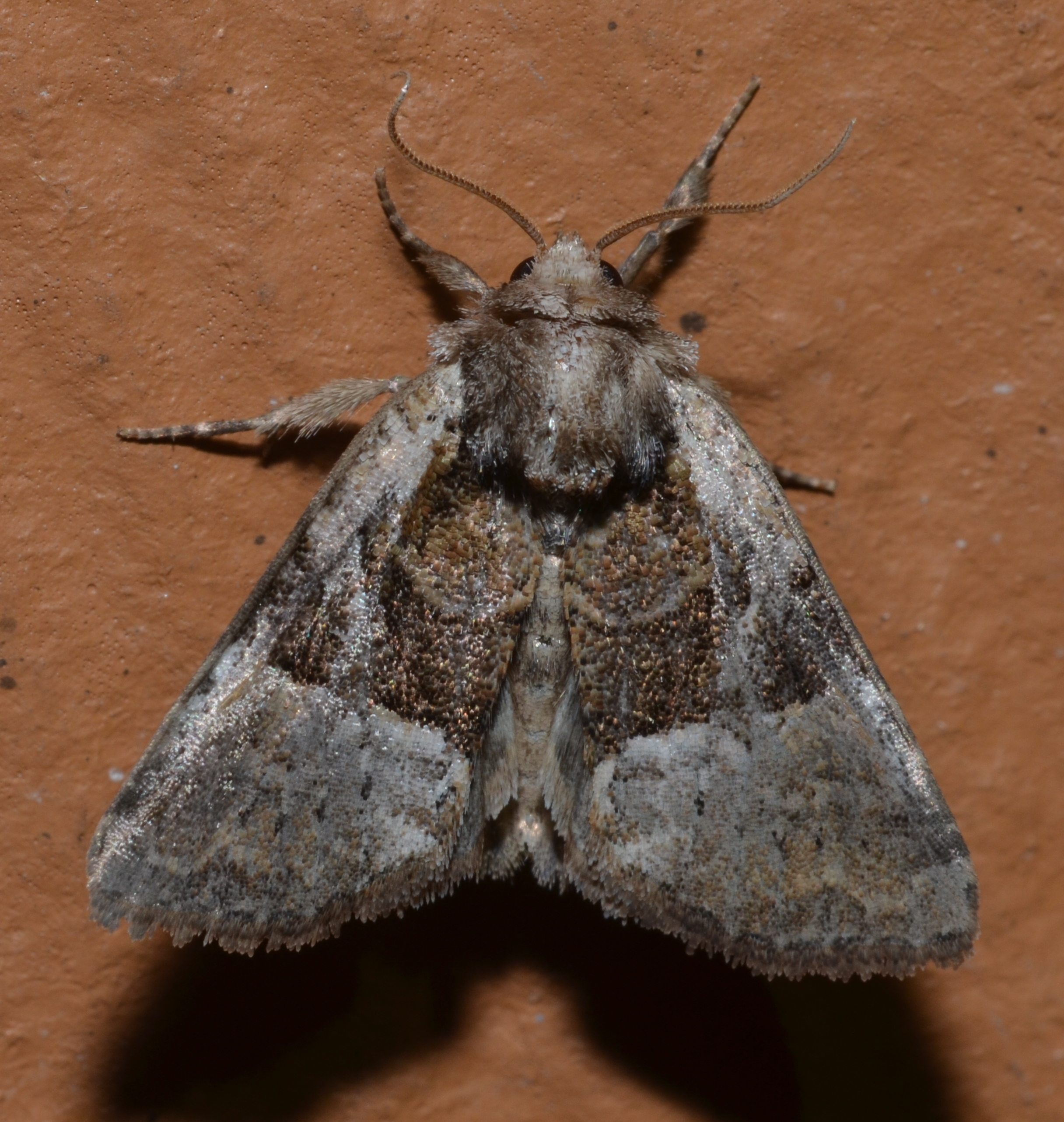

Scientific classification
- Kingdom: Animalia
- Phylum: Arthropoda
- Clade: Pancrustacea
- Class: Insecta
- Order: Lepidoptera
- Superfamily: Noctuoidea
- Family: Noctuidae
- Genus: Meropleon
- Species: M. ambifusca

Binomial name
- Meropleon ambifusca (Newman, 1948)

= Meropleon ambifusca =

Species of moth

Meropleon ambifusca, or Newman's brocade, is a species of cutworm or dart moth in the family Noctuidae. It was described by Newman in 1948 and is found in North America.

The MONA or Hodges number for Meropleon ambifusca is 9428. It is listed as a species of special concern in Connecticut, and its name is given on the list as Meropleon ambifuscum.
