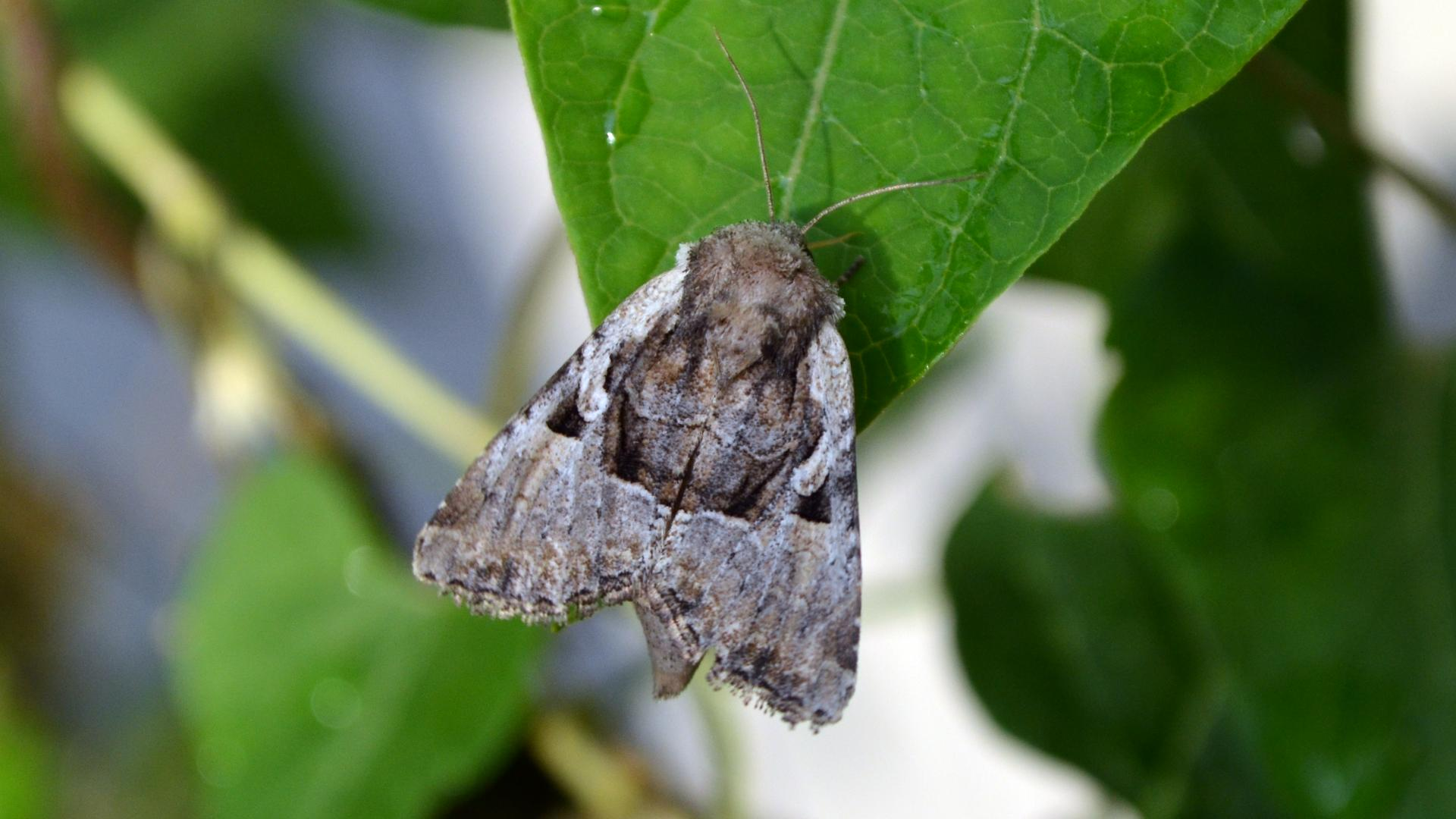

Scientific classification
- Domain: Eukaryota
- Kingdom: Animalia
- Phylum: Arthropoda
- Class: Insecta
- Order: Lepidoptera
- Superfamily: Noctuoidea
- Family: Noctuidae
- Genus: Meropleon
- Species: M. diversicolor

Binomial name
- Meropleon diversicolor (Morrison, 1875)

Synonyms
- Demas diversicolor Morrison, 1875; Meropleon diversicolor sullivani Ferguson, 1982

= Meropleon diversicolor =

Species of moth

Meropleon diversicolor, the multicolored sedgeminer moth, is a moth of the family Noctuidae. It is found in North America, where it has been recorded from Connecticut, Georgia, Indiana, Iowa, Kansas, Kentucky, Maine, Maryland, Massachusetts, Michigan, Minnesota, New Brunswick, New Hampshire, New Jersey, North Carolina, Ohio, Oklahoma, Ontario, Pennsylvania, Quebec, South Carolina, Tennessee and Wisconsin. The habitat consists of wetlands.

The wingspan is about 29 mm. Adults have been recorded on wing from June to October, with most records in August and September.

The larvae bore into sedges.
