= Dypterygia patina =

Scientific classification
- Domain: Eukaryota
- Kingdom: Animalia
- Phylum: Arthropoda
- Class: Insecta
- Order: Lepidoptera
- Superfamily: Noctuoidea
- Family: Noctuidae
- Genus: Dypterygia
- Species: D. patina

Binomial name
- Dypterygia patina (Harvey, 1875)

Synonyms
- Hadena patina Harvey, 1875; Dypterygia minorata Barnes, 1907

Species of moth

Dypterygia patina is a moth of the family Noctuidae. It is found in North America, including South Carolina, Texas and Arizona.
