= Resapamea venosa =

Scientific classification
- Domain: Eukaryota
- Kingdom: Animalia
- Phylum: Arthropoda
- Class: Insecta
- Order: Lepidoptera
- Superfamily: Noctuoidea
- Family: Noctuidae
- Tribe: Apameini
- Genus: Resapamea
- Species: R. venosa

Binomial name
- Resapamea venosa (Smith, 1903)

Species of insect

Resapamea venosa is a species of cutworm or dart moth in the family Noctuidae.

The MONA or Hodges number for Resapamea venosa is 9388.
