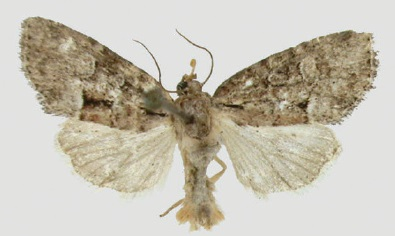
- Male
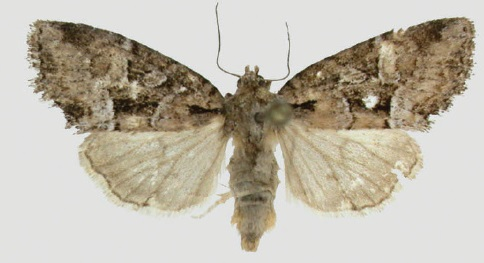
- Female

Scientific classification
- Domain: Eukaryota
- Kingdom: Animalia
- Phylum: Arthropoda
- Class: Insecta
- Order: Lepidoptera
- Superfamily: Noctuoidea
- Family: Noctuidae
- Tribe: Apameini
- Genus: Cherokeea; Quinter & Sullivan, 2014
- Species: C. attakullakulla

Binomial name
- Cherokeea attakullakulla Quinter & Sullivan, 2014

= Cherokeea =

Genus of moths

Cherokeea attakullakulla is a moth in the family Noctuidae and the only species in the genus Cherokeea. It is found in North Carolina (Swain and Macon Counties in the mountains and Rutherford County in the foothills) and Georgia (Rabun County).

The length of the forewings is 9.8–11.7 mm. The forewings are variable, ranging from nearly uniform dull grey to much more contrasting and mottled, especially in females. The antemedial line is excurved, doubled, with pale grey to nearly white filling. It is slightly scalloped and composed of black scales. The medial line or shade is obscure and the postmedial line is sinuous. The basal, medial and terminal areas are predominantly uniform grey, with some reddish-brown scaling in the medial and basal areas in some individuals. The hindwings are pale grey and unmarked except for a faint discal spot. There are two patterns of maculation, mottled and plain. Intermediates are seen as well. Adults have been recorded on wing in June. There is one generation per year.

The larvae probably feed on Arundinaria appalachiana.

== Etymology ==
The genus name is derived from Cherokee, a Nation of Native American people who occupied the southern Appalachians. The species name refers to the Supreme Cherokee Leader (from 1761–1775) who represented his people in London in 1730 and at home in the Carolinas while negotiating various peace treaties.
