= Resapamea stipata =

Scientific classification
- Domain: Eukaryota
- Kingdom: Animalia
- Phylum: Arthropoda
- Class: Insecta
- Order: Lepidoptera
- Superfamily: Noctuoidea
- Family: Noctuidae
- Tribe: Apameini
- Genus: Resapamea
- Species: R. stipata

Binomial name
- Resapamea stipata (Morrison, 1875)

Species of moth

Resapamea stipata, known generally as the four-lined borer moth or the four-lined cordgrass borer, is a species of cutworm or dart moth in the family Noctuidae.

The MONA or Hodges number for Resapamea stipata is 9393.
