= Dypterygia cristifera =

Scientific classification
- Kingdom: Animalia
- Phylum: Arthropoda
- Class: Insecta
- Order: Lepidoptera
- Superfamily: Noctuoidea
- Family: Noctuidae
- Genus: Dypterygia
- Species: D. cristifera

Binomial name
- Dypterygia cristifera Hampson, 1893

Species of moth

Dypterygia cristifera is a moth of the family Noctuidae first described by George Hampson in 1893. It is found in Sri Lanka.
