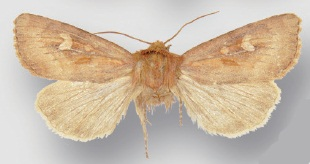
- Male

Scientific classification
- Kingdom: Animalia
- Phylum: Arthropoda
- Class: Insecta
- Order: Lepidoptera
- Superfamily: Noctuoidea
- Family: Noctuidae
- Genus: Resapamea
- Species: R. hedeni

Binomial name
- Resapamea hedeni (Graeser, [1889])

Synonyms
- Hadena hedeni Graeser, [1889]; Luperina hedeni; Cosmia vulpecula Eversmann, 1852; Hadena radicosa Graeser, 1892; Hadena subaquila Graeser, 1892; Hadena subornata Staudinger, 1896; Hadena terrago Alphéraky, 1897; Luperina eversmanni Kozhantschikov, 1936; Palluperina rubrina Bryk, 1942; Luperina takanensis Marumo, 1932

= Resapamea hedeni =

Species of moth

Resapamea hedeni is a moth in the family Noctuidae. It is found from southern Europe to Japan.

== Subspecies ==
- Resapamea hedeni hedeni (south-eastern Europe, southern Urals, southern Siberia, Inner Mongolia, the Kuriles, Japan: Hokkaido)
- Resapamea hedeni rhodochrea (Varga & L. Ronkay, 1992) (western Tien Shan)
- Resapamea hedeni takanensis (Marumo, 1932) (Japan: Honshu)
- Resapamea hedeni vargai (Hacker, 1988) (eastern Turkey)
