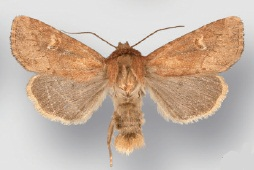
- Male

Scientific classification
- Domain: Eukaryota
- Kingdom: Animalia
- Phylum: Arthropoda
- Class: Insecta
- Order: Lepidoptera
- Superfamily: Noctuoidea
- Family: Noctuidae
- Genus: Resapamea
- Species: R. innota

Binomial name
- Resapamea innota (Smith, 1908)

Synonyms
- Luperina innota Smith, 1908

= Resapamea innota =

Species of moth

Resapamea innota is a moth in the family Noctuidae. It is found in eastern Washington and Oregon, across central and southern Idaho and northern and eastern California. The habitat consists of wet meadows at low or middle elevations.

The length of the forewings is 14–17 mm. There are two forms, one with red-brown forewings with a pale reniform spot and the other with gray and light tan forewings with lighter spots and a more complex pattern. Adults are on wing from mid June to July

The larvae probably bore into the stems and roots of herbaceous vegetation.
