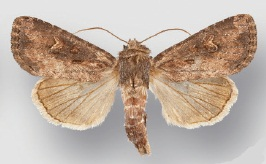
- Female
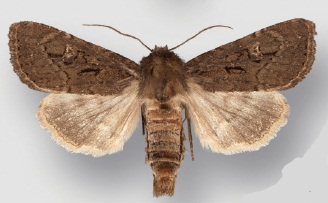
- Male

Scientific classification
- Kingdom: Animalia
- Phylum: Arthropoda
- Class: Insecta
- Order: Lepidoptera
- Superfamily: Noctuoidea
- Family: Noctuidae
- Genus: Resapamea
- Species: R. passer

Binomial name
- Resapamea passer (Guenée, 1852)

Synonyms
- Mamestra passer Guenée, 1852; Mesapamea passer; Hadena birnata Smith, 1908; Luceria conspicua Morrison, 1874; Agrotis incallida Walker, 1857; Luceria loculata Morrison, 1874; Hadena hulstii Grote, 1880; Luperina hulstii; Hadena morna Strecker, 1878; Luperina morna; Hadena virguncula Smith, 1899; Luperina virguncula

= Resapamea passer =

Species of moth

Resapamea passer, the dock rustic moth, is a moth in the family Noctuidae. It is found from central Alberta to northern Arizona in the Rocky Mountain region. In the mid-Continent it ranges from Minnesota and southern Ontario to Oklahoma and North Carolina, reaching the Atlantic Coast from Newfoundland to Maryland. The habitat consists of wetlands.

The length of the forewings is 15–19 mm.

The larvae feed on Rumex and possibly Polygonum species. They bore into the stems and roots of their host plant.
