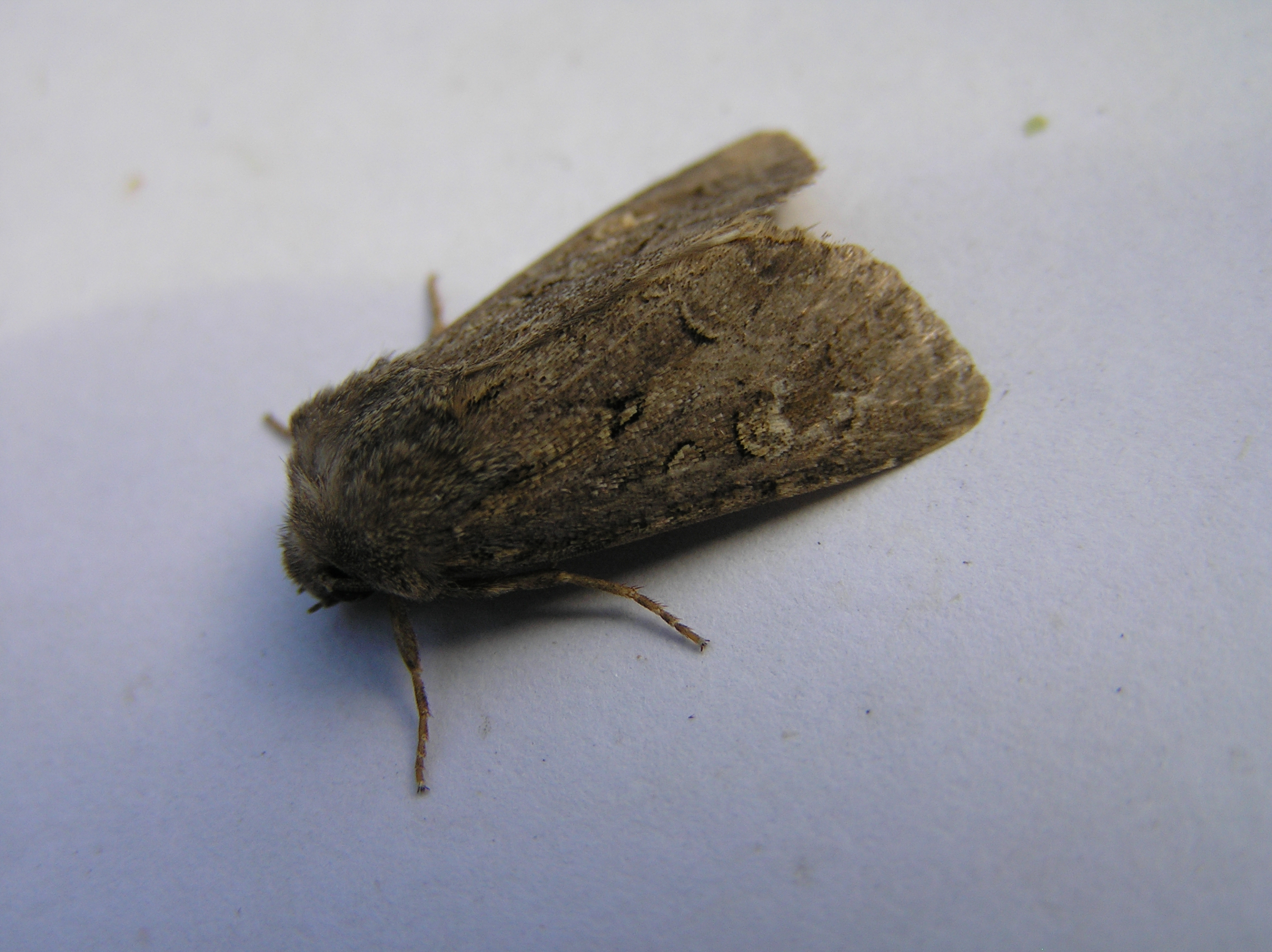

Scientific classification
- Domain: Eukaryota
- Kingdom: Animalia
- Phylum: Arthropoda
- Class: Insecta
- Order: Lepidoptera
- Superfamily: Noctuoidea
- Family: Noctuidae
- Genus: Luperina
- Species: L. testacea

Binomial name
- Luperina testacea (Denis & Schiffermüller, 1775)

= Luperina testacea =

Species of moth

Luperina testacea, the flounced rustic, is a moth of the family Noctuidae. It is found in Europe, Asia Minor and Armenia.

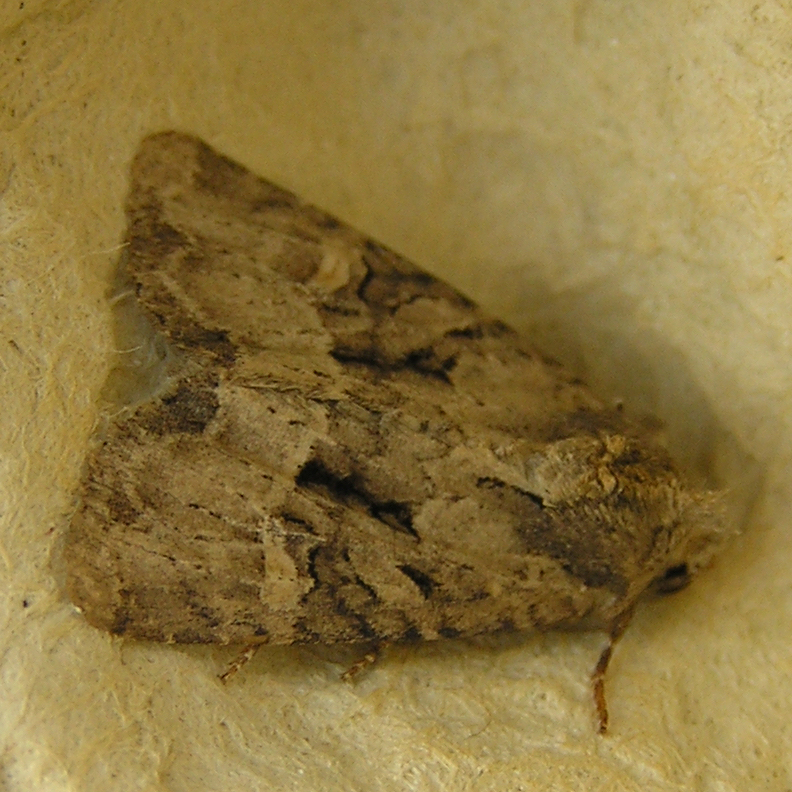

== Technical description and variation ==
The wingspan is 30–35 mm. The length of the forewings is 14–18 mm."Forewing light to dark fuscous, often with a faint ochreous or brownish tinge; the veins darker; inner and outer lines double, filled in with pale, but varying in intensity; claviform stigma of the ground colour with black line; orbicular and reniform paler with darker centres; submarginal line pale, obscure, often shown only by the dark terminal areabeyond it: hindwing whitish with dark veins and black marginal line; of the forms without any ochreous or rufous tinge, ab. obsoleta Tutt is pale grey without definite dark markings; — ab. cinerea Tutt has the grey darker, more fuscous; — ab. nigrescens Tutt has the ground colour blackish of varying degrees of intensity; the inner and outer lines are sometimes connected by a black streak: — in ab. unca Haw., the streak is thin and the two lines well separated; — ab. x-notata Haw. has the streak thick and the lines closely approximated".

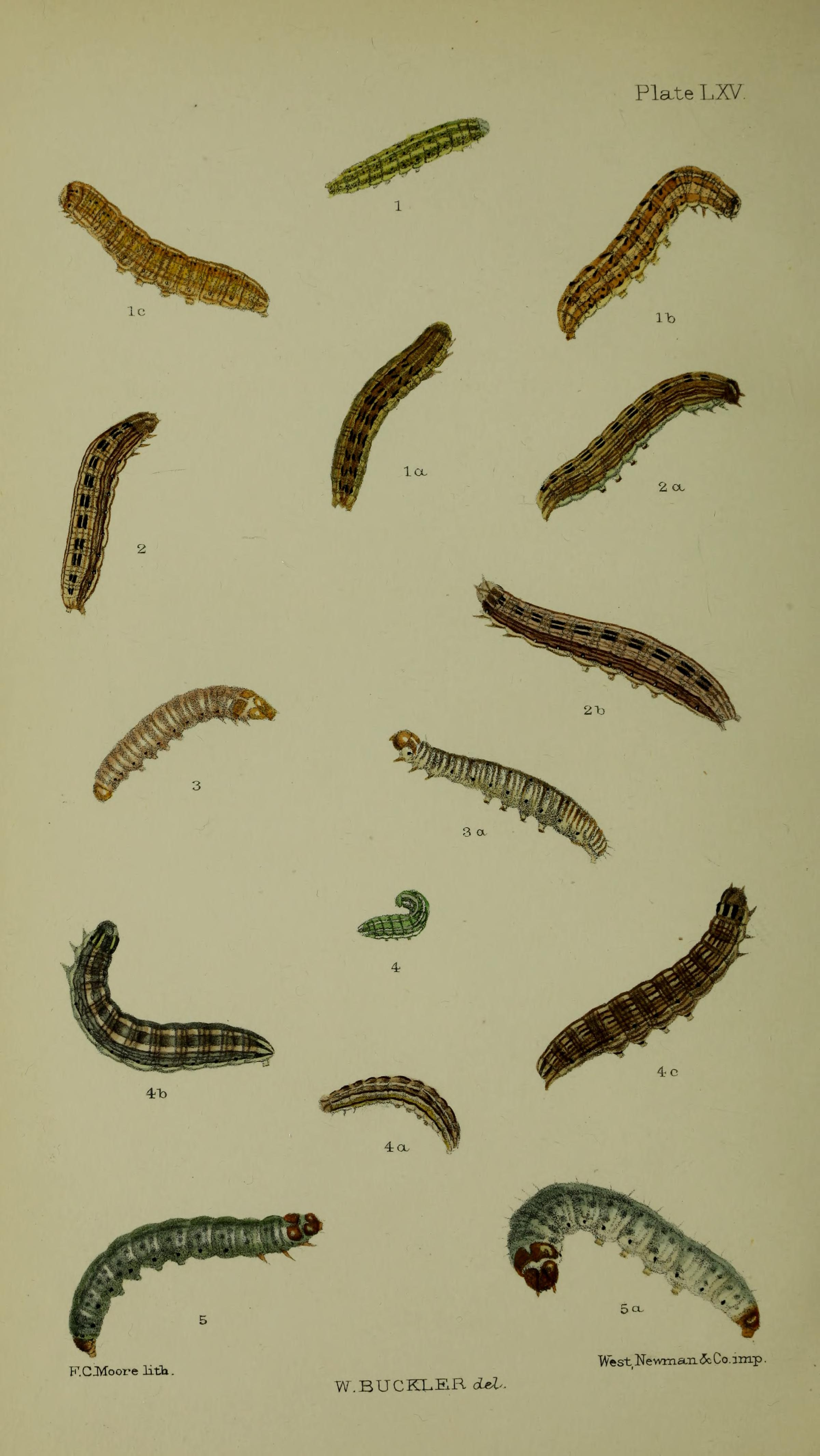
Figs 3, 3a larva after last moult

== Biology ==
The moth flies in one generation from mid-July to early October.

Larva dirty whiteish, without lines; head and plates brown. The larvae feed on various grasses and grains.

== Notes ==
1. The flight season refers to Belgium and the Netherlands. This may vary in other parts of the range.
