= Dypterygia dolens =

Scientific classification
- Kingdom: Animalia
- Phylum: Arthropoda
- Clade: Pancrustacea
- Class: Insecta
- Order: Lepidoptera
- Superfamily: Noctuoidea
- Family: Noctuidae
- Tribe: Dypterygiini
- Genus: Dypterygia
- Species: D. dolens

Binomial name
- Dypterygia dolens (Druce, 1909)

Species of moth

Dypterygia dolens is a species of cutworm or dart moth in the family Noctuidae. It is found in North America.
