= Nikolaus Joseph Brahm =

German zoologist and advocate

- Born: May 18, 1754
- Died: June 29, 1821 (aged 67)
- Occupation(s): Zoologist, writer

Nikolaus Joseph Brahm (18 May 1754 – 29 June 1821) was a German zoologist and advocate born in the Holy Roman Empire. Brahm named several species of Coleoptera and Lepidoptera. There is no information about the fate of his collection, which was never cited in the literature.
