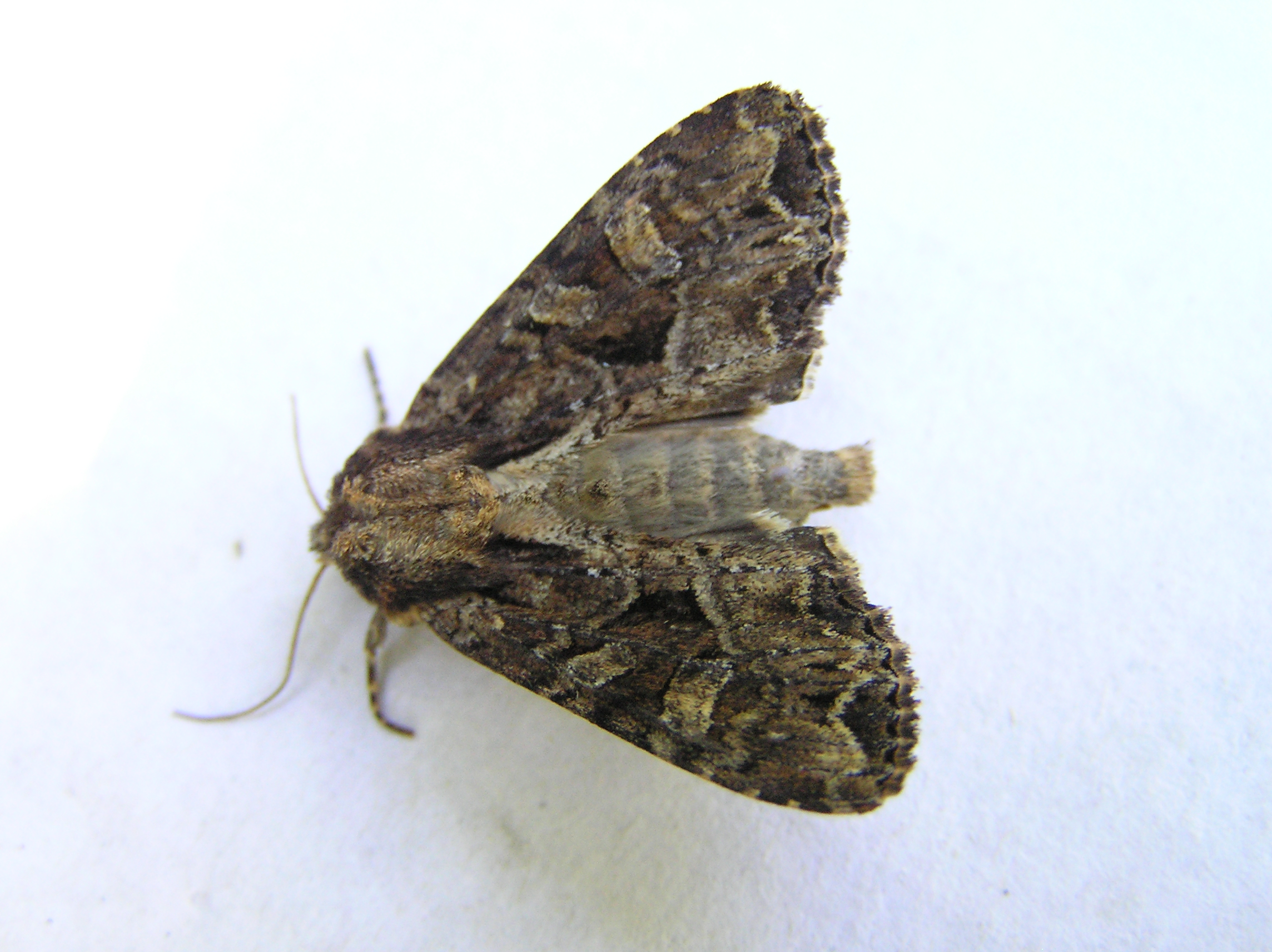
- Apamea remissa

Scientific classification
- Domain: Eukaryota
- Kingdom: Animalia
- Phylum: Arthropoda
- Class: Insecta
- Order: Lepidoptera
- Superfamily: Noctuoidea
- Family: Noctuidae
- Subfamily: Noctuinae
- Tribe: Apameini

Genera
- See text

= Apameini =

Tribe of moths

The Apameini are a mid-sized tribe of moths in the Noctuinae subfamily (formerly in the Hadeninae subfamily).

== Selected genera ==
- Aliona Gyulai, Saldaitis & Zilli, 2019
- Achatodes Guenée, 1852
- Apamea Ochsenheimer, 1816
- Archanara Walker, 1866
- Cherokeea Quinter & Sullivan, 2014
- Eremobina McDunnough, 1937
- Helotropha Lederer, 1857
- Hydraecia Guenée, 1841
- Hypocoena Hampson, 1908
- Luperina Boisduval, 1829
- Macronoctua Grote, 1874
- Minigrapta Kononenko & Matov, 2012
- Oligia Hübner, 1821
- Papaipema Smith, 1899
