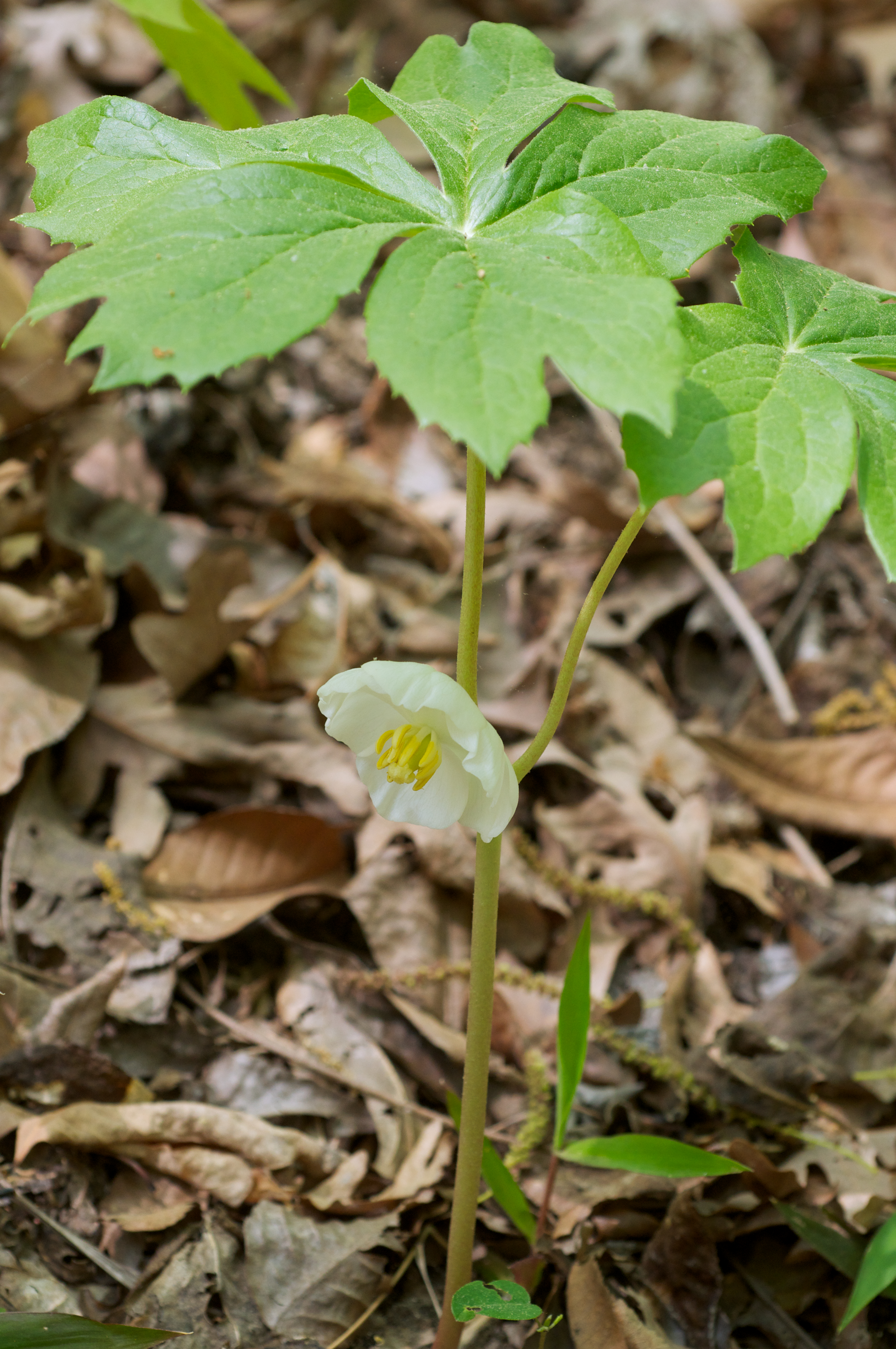

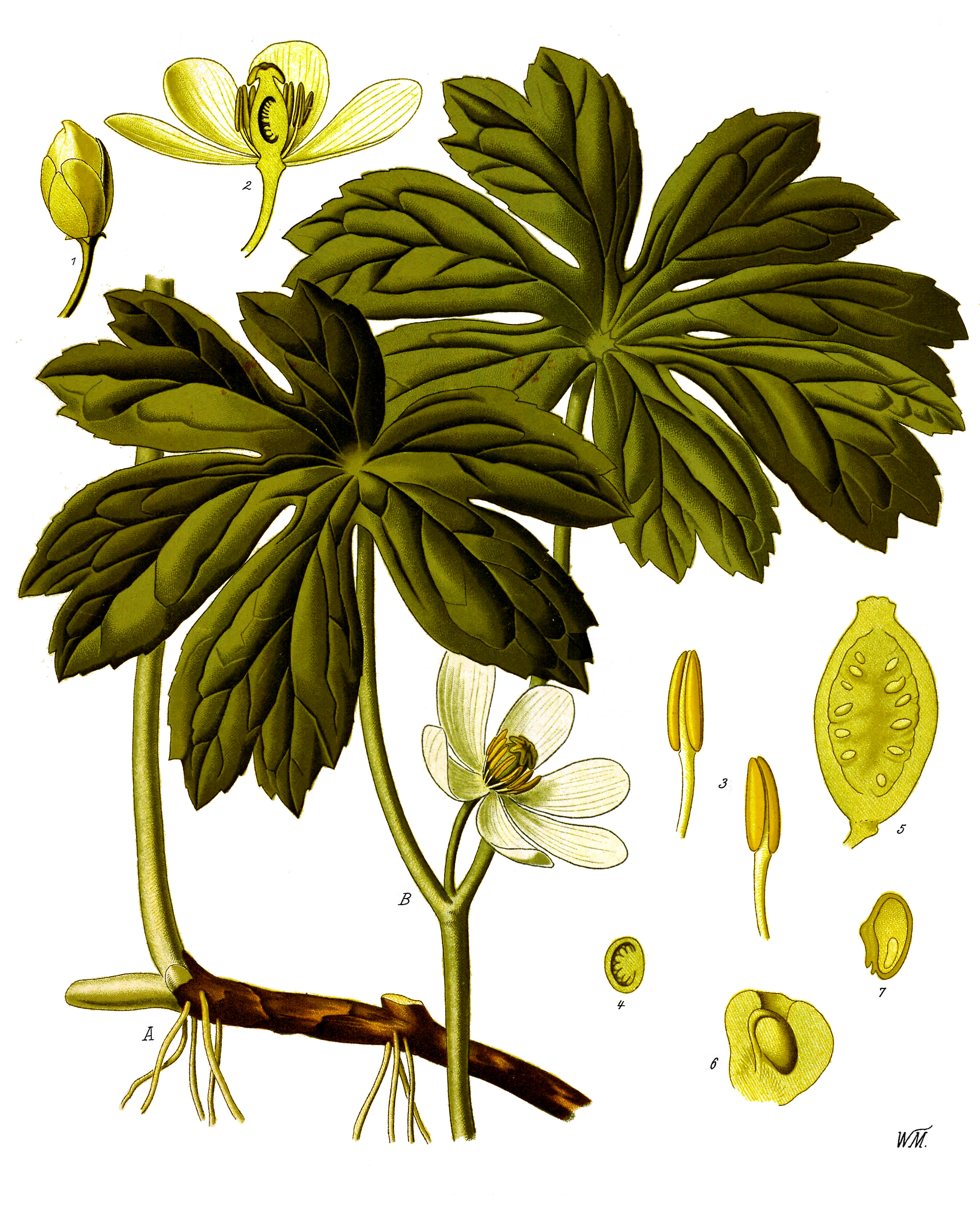
- Podophyllum peltatum

Conservation status
- Secure (NatureServe)

Scientific classification
- Kingdom: Plantae
- Clade: Tracheophytes
- Clade: Angiosperms
- Clade: Eudicots
- Order: Ranunculales
- Family: Berberidaceae
- Genus: Podophyllum
- Species: P. peltatum

Binomial name
- Podophyllum peltatum L.

Synonyms
- Anapodophyllum peltatum Moench

= Podophyllum peltatum =

Mayapple

Species of flowering plants belonging to the barberry family

Podophyllum peltatum is a North American herbaceous perennial plant in the family Berberidaceae. Its common names are mayapple, American mandrake, wild mandrake, and ground lemon.

== Description ==
Mayapples are woodland plants, typically growing in colonies derived from a single root. The stems grow to 30–40 cm (12–16 in) tall, with palmately lobed umbrella-like leaves up to 20–40 cm (7.9–15.7 in) diameter with 3–9 shallowly to deeply cut lobes. The plants produce several stems from a creeping underground rhizome; some stems bear a single leaf and do not produce any flower or fruit, while flowering stems produce a pair or more leaves with 1–8 flowers in the axil between the apical leaves. The flowers are white, yellow or red, 2–6 cm (1–2 in) diameter with 6–9 petals, and mature into a green, yellow or red fleshy fruit 2–5 cm (1–2 in) long.

Though the common name is mayapple, in some areas it is the flower that appears in early May, not the "apple". The fruit or "apple" is usually produced early in summer and ripens later in summer.

== Distribution and habitat ==
It is widespread across most of the eastern United States and southeastern Canada.

== Ecology ==
They are a larval host for the golden borer moth and the may apple borer.

Many species of plants have mycorrhizae to assist with nutrient uptake in infertile conditions. Mayapple plants are considered obligately dependent upon such mycorrhizae, although it may also be facultatively dependent upon rhizome age and soil nutrient levels. Plants are commonly found infected by the rust Allodus podophylli, appearing as honeycomb-patterned orange colonies under the leaves, and yellowish lesions on the upper surface.

== Toxicity ==
All the parts of the plant are poisonous, including the unripe green fruit and perhaps the ripe fruit eaten in excess. The rhizome, foliage, and roots are all poisonous. Mayapple contains podophyllotoxin or podophyllin, which is highly toxic if consumed.

== Uses ==
The ripened yellow fruit is edible in small amounts and is sometimes made into jelly.

Mayapple has been used by Indigenous Americans as an emetic, cathartic, and antihelmintic agent. The rhizome of the mayapple has been used for a variety of medicinal purposes, originally by indigenous inhabitants and later by other settlers.

Mayapple can be used topically as an escharotic in removing warts, and two of its derivatives, etoposide and teniposide, have shown promise in treating some cancers. Etoposide is among the World Health Organisation's list of essential medicines and it is derived from podophyllotoxin. Podophyllotoxin or podophyllin is used as a purgative and as a cytostatic. Posalfilin is a drug containing podophyllin and salicylic acid that is used to treat the plantar wart.

They are also grown as ornamental plants for their attractive foliage and flowers.

== Gallery ==
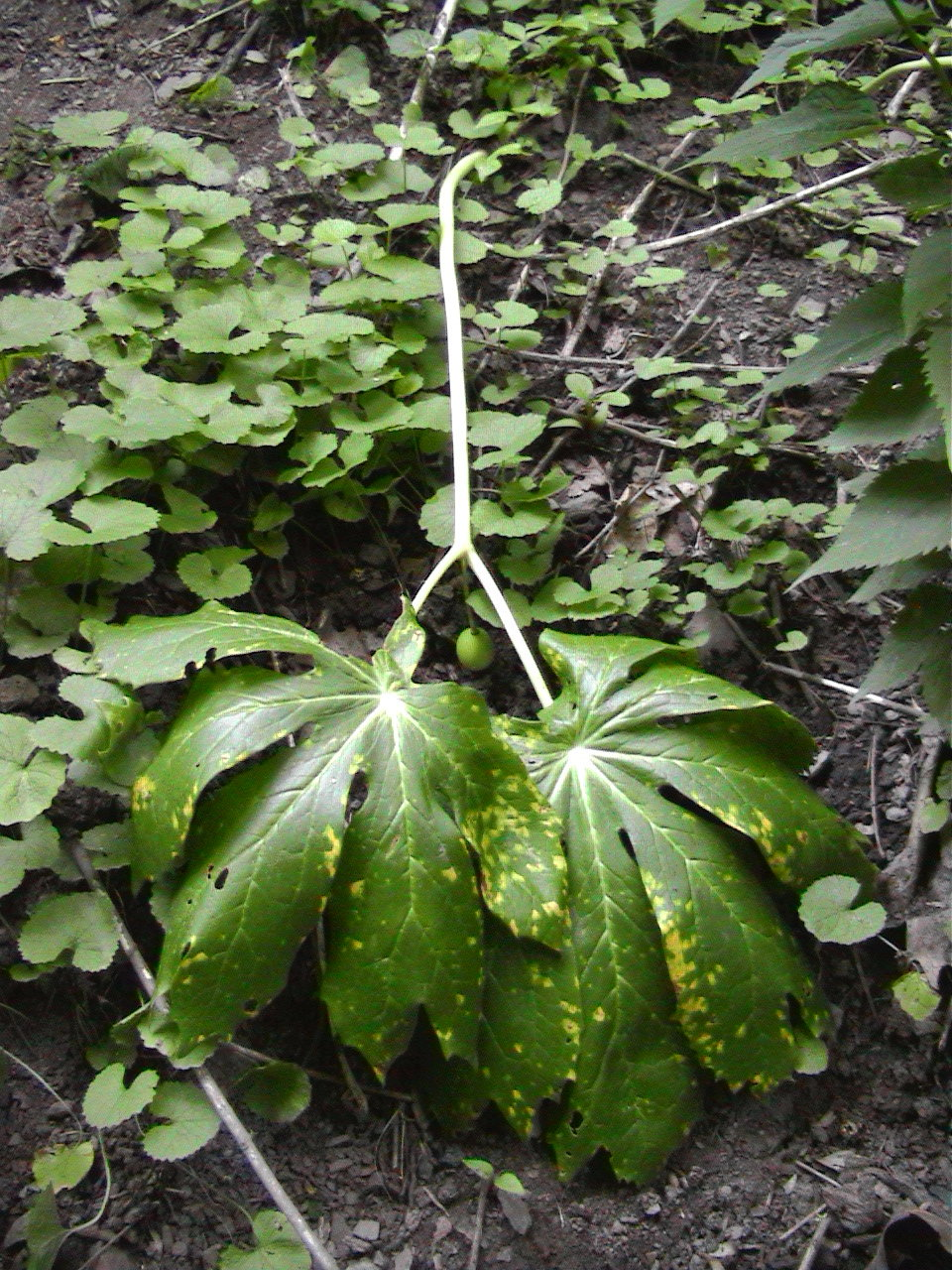
P. peltatum fruit

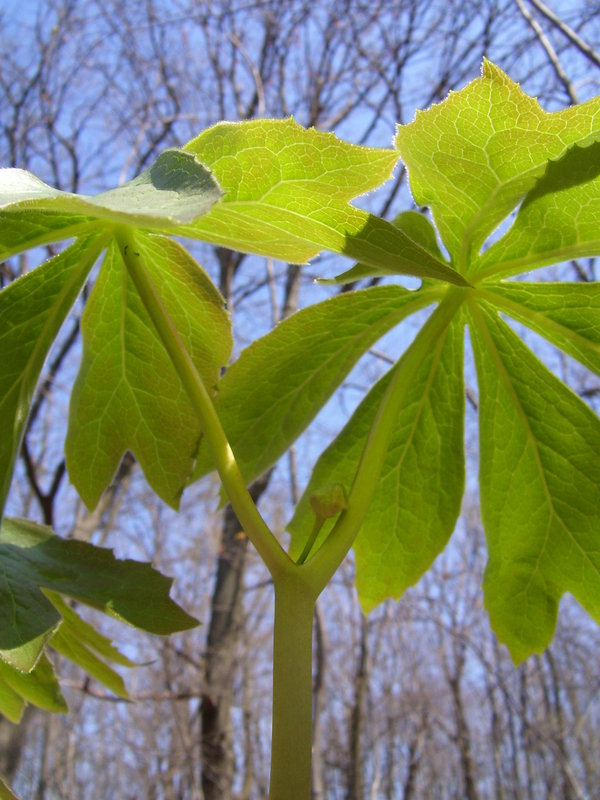
P. peltatum fruit

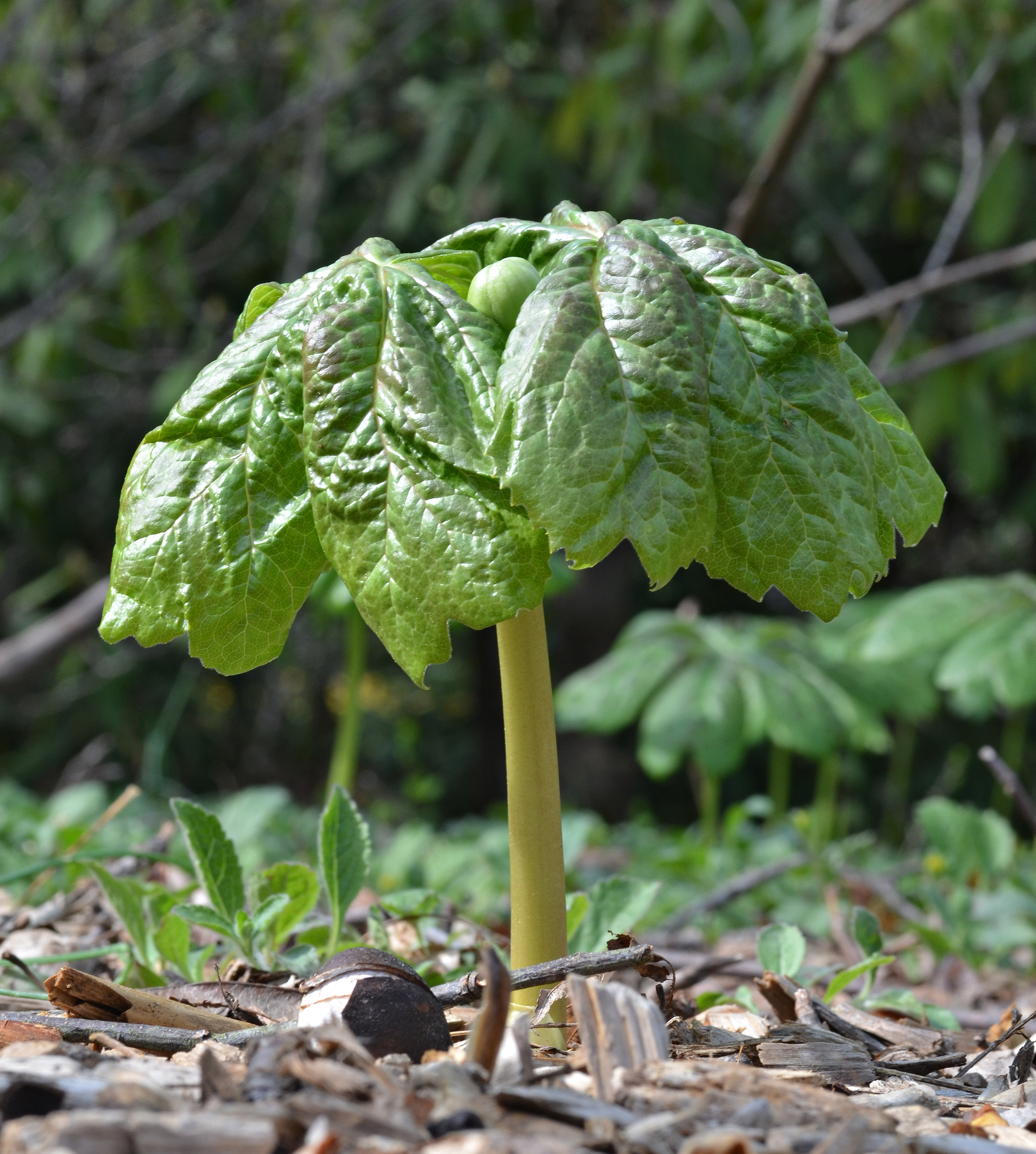
P. peltatum fruit

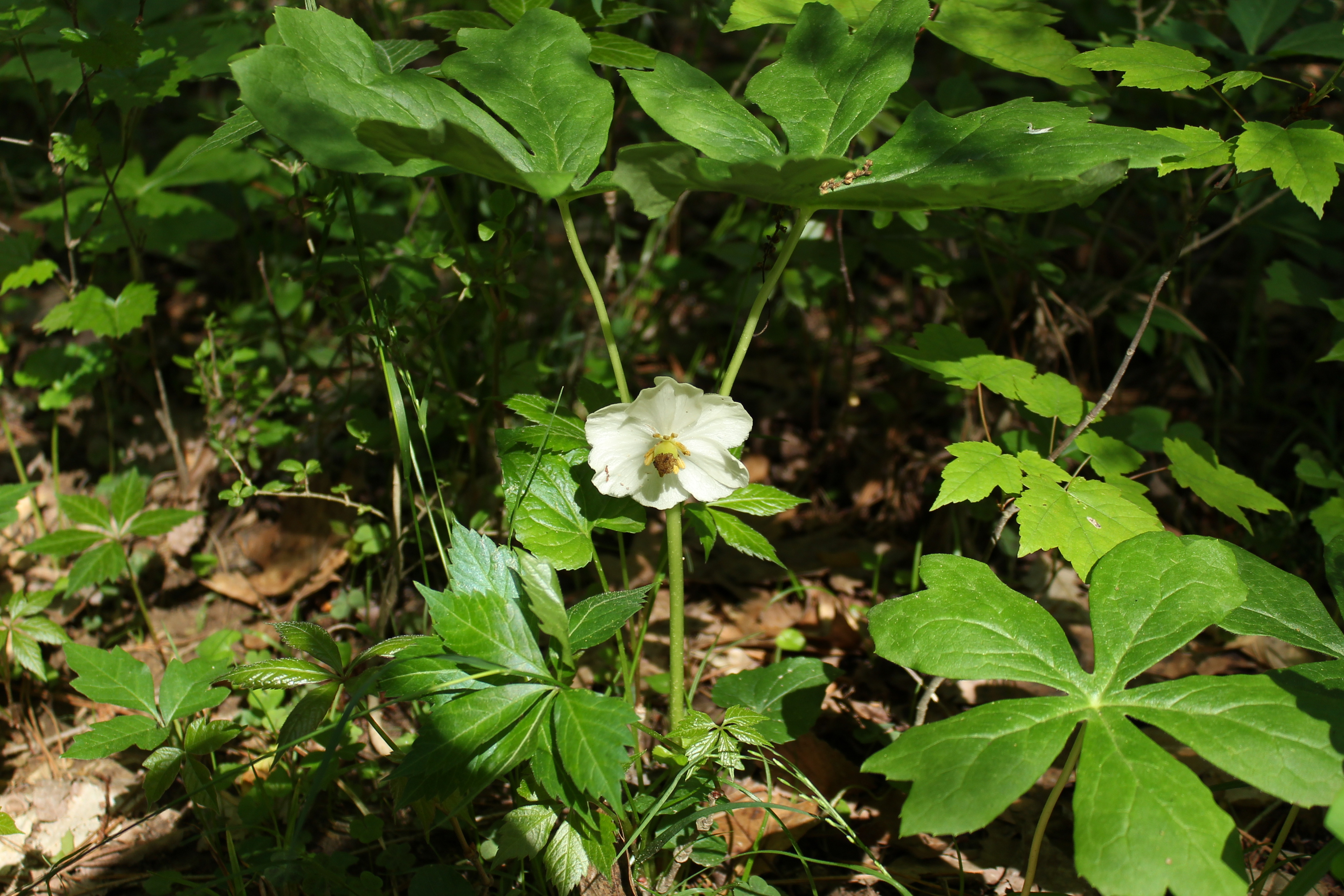
P. peltatum flower

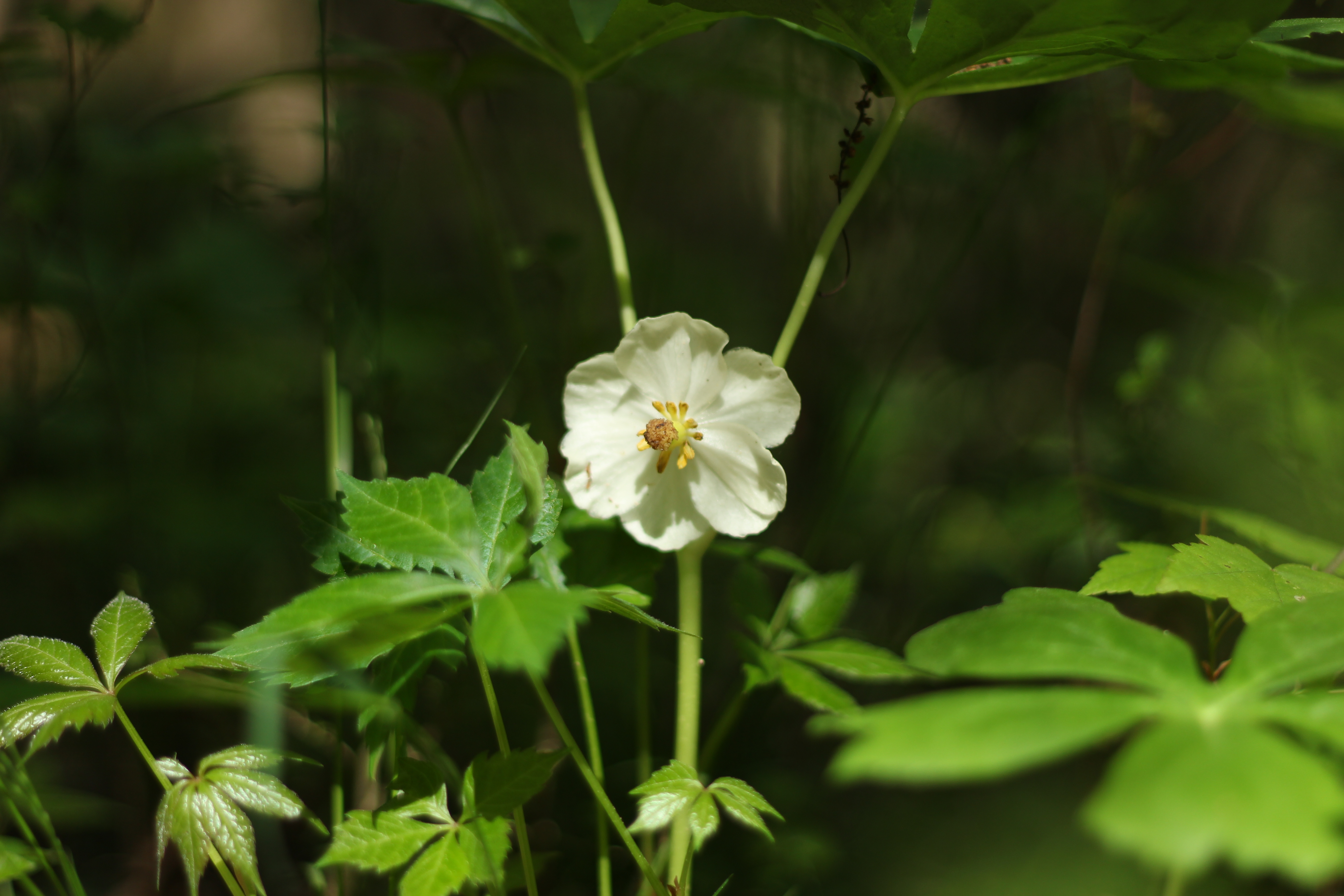
P. peltatum flower
