= Indian apple =

Indian apple is a common name for several plants and may refer to:

- Podophyllum peltatum, a toxic, herbaceous perennial plant
- Datura innoxia, a hallucinogenic plant
- Pomegranate, a fruit-bearing plant native to Asia
- Limonia acidissima, a fruit-bearing tree native to South Asia.
- Phyllanthus emblica, a small fruit-bearing tree native to India.
