= Dichomeris washingtoniella =

Scientific classification
- Domain: Eukaryota
- Kingdom: Animalia
- Phylum: Arthropoda
- Class: Insecta
- Order: Lepidoptera
- Family: Gelechiidae
- Genus: Dichomeris
- Species: D. washingtoniella

Binomial name
- Dichomeris washingtoniella (Busck, 1906)

Synonyms
- Trichotaphe washingtoniella Busck, 1906

Species of moth

Dichomeris washingtoniella is a moth in the family Gelechiidae. It was described by August Busck in 1906. It is found in North America, where it has been recorded from Connecticut, southern Ontario, Kentucky, Ohio, Kansas and Oklahoma.

The wingspan is about 16 mm. The forewings are dark purplish brown with two connected, round, velvety black blotches on the fold, the outer one extending up in the middle of the wing, containing a few ochreous scales. At the end of the cell is a somewhat larger aggregation of ochreous scales, forming two small indistinct moon-shaped spots, separated and partly surrounded by velvety black scales. Just before apex is a transverse velvety black fascia, outwardly nearly straight and parallel with the edge of the wing, inwardly sharply angulate, the point indistinctly connected by black scales with the second discal spot. The hindwings are light fuscous, darkest towards the tip. Adults are on wing from May to September.

The larvae feed on Eupatorium and Epilobium species, as well as Vernonia missurica, and Ambrosia artemisifolia.
