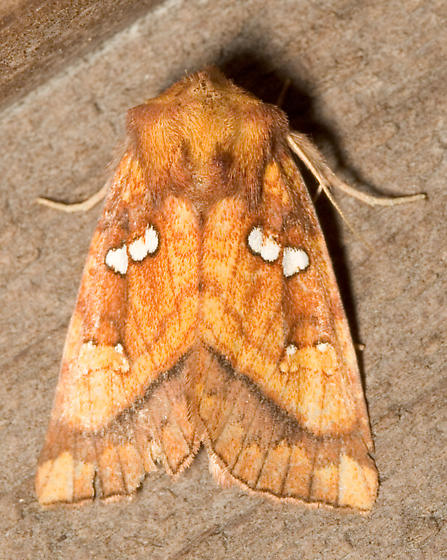

Scientific classification
- Domain: Eukaryota
- Kingdom: Animalia
- Phylum: Arthropoda
- Class: Insecta
- Order: Lepidoptera
- Superfamily: Noctuoidea
- Family: Noctuidae
- Genus: Papaipema
- Species: P. lysimachiae

Binomial name
- Papaipema lysimachiae Bird, 1914

Synonyms
- Papaipema purpurifascia Grote & Robinson, 1868

= Papaipema lysimachiae =

Loosestrife Borer

Species of moth

The loosestrife borer (Papaipema lysimachiae) is a moth of the family Noctuidae. It is found from New Brunswick to Georgia, west to Illinois, north to Wisconsin and Ontario.

The wingspan is 28–35 mm. Adults are on wing from August to October.

The larvae bore the stems and roots of Lysimachia quadrifolia.
