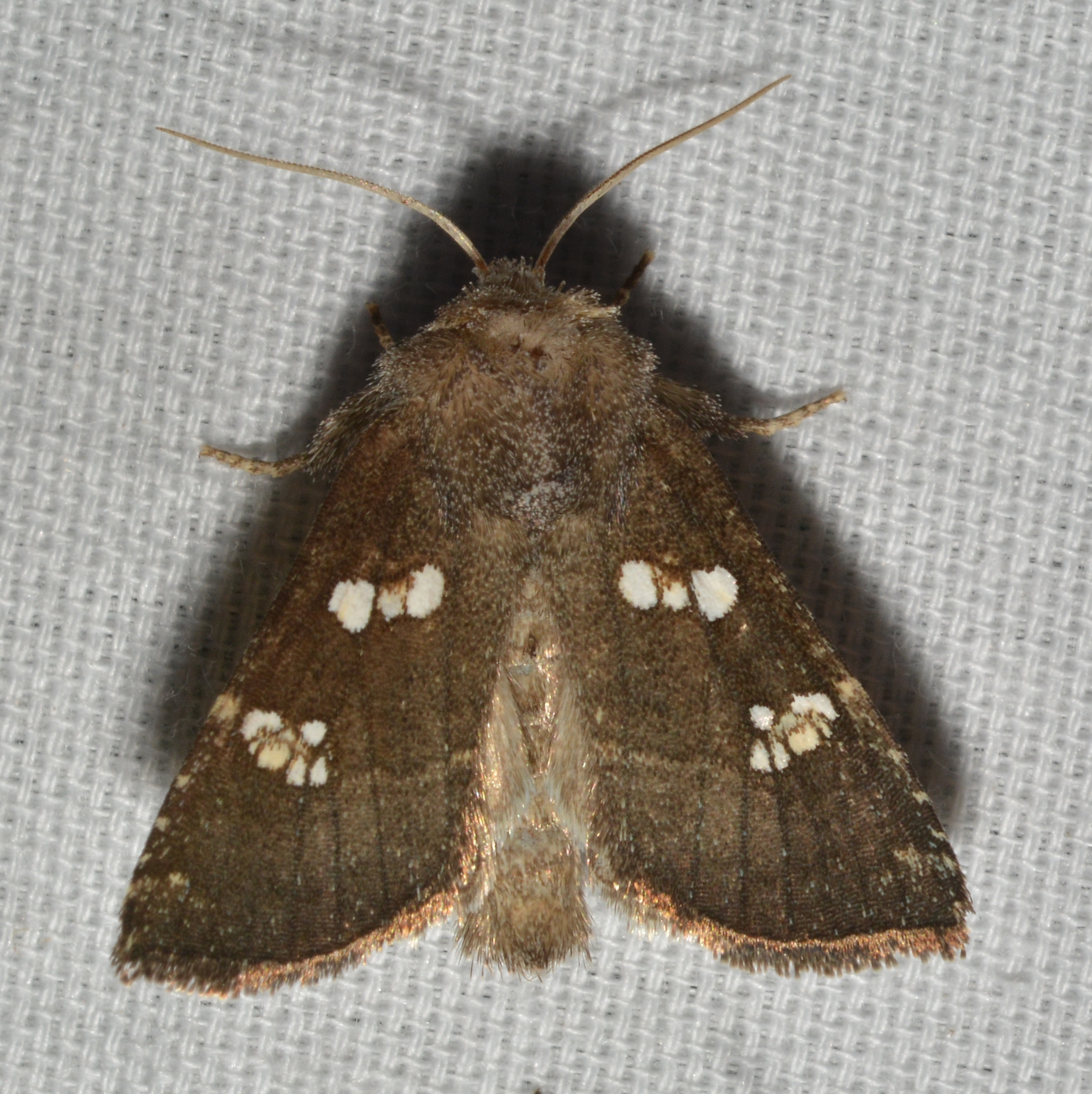

Scientific classification
- Kingdom: Animalia
- Phylum: Arthropoda
- Clade: Pancrustacea
- Class: Insecta
- Order: Lepidoptera
- Superfamily: Noctuoidea
- Family: Noctuidae
- Genus: Papaipema
- Species: P. limpida

Binomial name
- Papaipema limpida (Guenée, 1852)

= Papaipema limpida =

Vernonia borer

Species of moth

Papaipema limpida, the vernonia borer, is a species of cutworm or dart moth in the family Noctuidae. It is found in North America.
