= Papaipema sauzalitae =

Scientific classification
- Kingdom: Animalia
- Phylum: Arthropoda
- Clade: Pancrustacea
- Class: Insecta
- Order: Lepidoptera
- Superfamily: Noctuoidea
- Family: Noctuidae
- Genus: Papaipema
- Species: P. sauzalitae

Binomial name
- Papaipema sauzalitae (Grote, 1875)

Species of moth

Papaipema sauzalitae, the figwort stem borer, is a species of cutworm or dart moth in the family Noctuidae.

The MONA or Hodges number for Papaipema sauzalitae is 9474.
