= Papaipema unimoda =

Meadow Rue Borer

Scientific classification
- Kingdom: Animalia
- Phylum: Arthropoda
- Clade: Pancrustacea
- Class: Insecta
- Order: Lepidoptera
- Superfamily: Noctuoidea
- Family: Noctuidae
- Genus: Papaipema
- Species: P. unimoda

Binomial name
- Papaipema unimoda (Smith, 1894)

Synonyms
- Hydroecia unimoda Smith, 1894; Hydroecia frigida Smith, 1899; Gortyna thalictri Lyman, 1905; Papaipema frigida Hampson, 1910; Papaipema terminalis Strand, 1916; Papaipema perobsoleta (Lyman, 1905); Papaipema imperspicua Bird, 1908

Species of moth

The meadow rue borer (Papaipema unimoda) is a species of moth of the family Noctuidae. It is found in the north-eastern United States and southern Canada east of the Rocky Mountains.

The wingspan is 30–40 mm. Adults are on wing from August to October in one generation per year.

The larvae feed on Thalictrum, Rudbeckia, Smilax, and Polemonium species. They bore in the roots and stems of their host plant.
