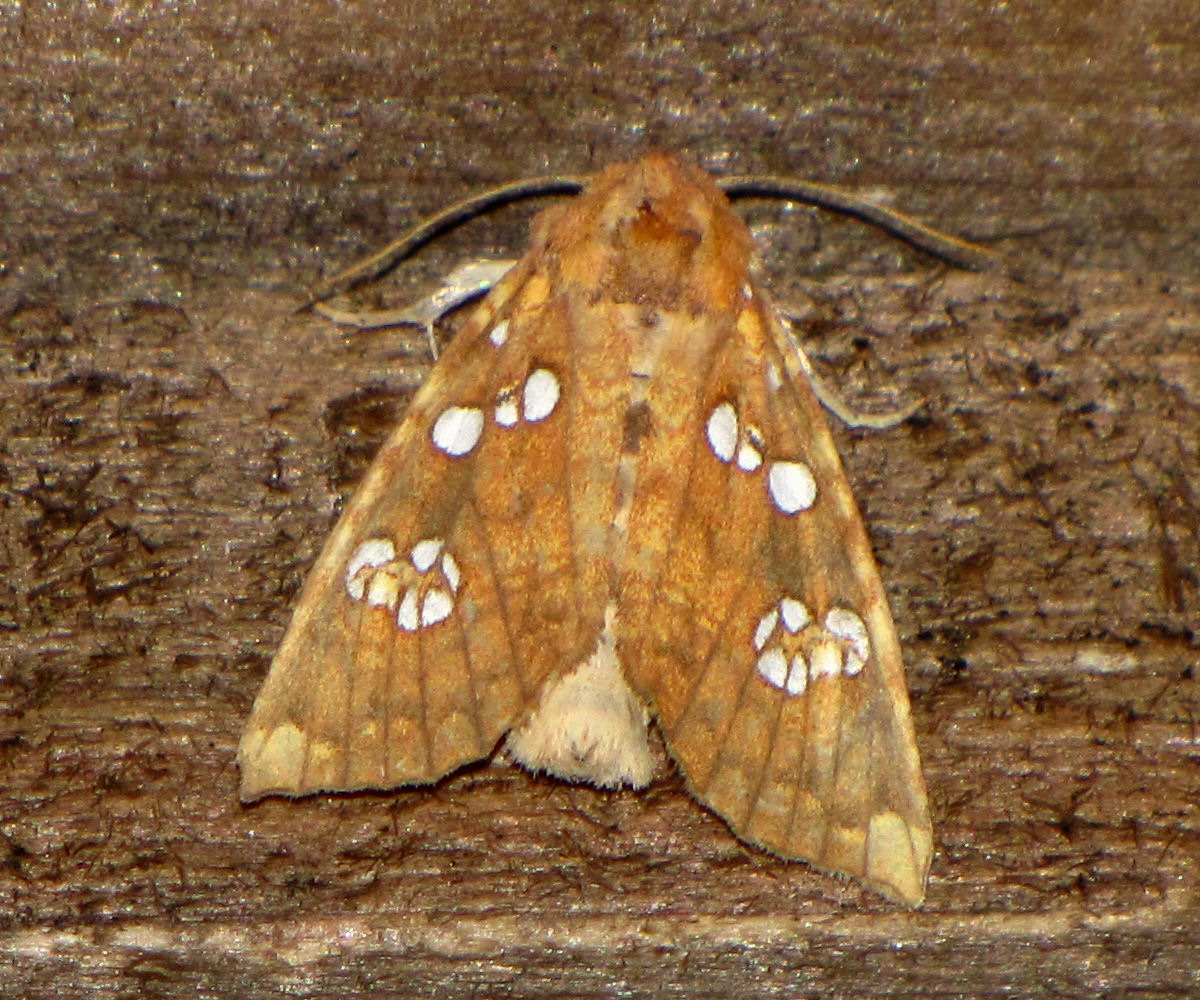
- Papaipema furcata

Scientific classification
- Kingdom: Animalia
- Phylum: Arthropoda
- Class: Insecta
- Order: Lepidoptera
- Superfamily: Noctuoidea
- Family: Noctuidae
- Tribe: Apameini
- Genus: Papaipema; Smith, 1899

Type species
- Gortyna cerina Grote, 1874

= Papaipema =

Genus of moths

Papaipema is a genus of moths of the family Noctuidae. The genus was erected by John B. Smith in 1899.

== Species ==
Listed alphabetically:

- Papaipema aerata (Lyman, 1901)
- Papaipema angelica (Smith, 1899) – angelica borer
- Papaipema apicata Dyar, 1912
- Papaipema appassionata (Harvey, 1876) – pitcher plant borer
- Papaipema araliae Bird & Jones, 1921 – aralia shoot borer
- Papaipema arctivorens Hampson, 1910 – northern burdock borer
- Papaipema astuta Bird, 1907 – yellow stoneroot borer
- Papaipema aweme (Lyman, 1908) – aweme borer
- Papaipema baptisiae (Bird, 1902) – indigo stem borer
- Papaipema beeriana Bird, 1923 – (Beer's) blazing star borer
- Papaipema birdi (Dyar, 1908) – umbellifer borer
- Papaipema cataphracta (Grote, 1864) – burdock borer
- Papaipema cerina (Grote, 1874) – golden borer
- Papaipema cerussata (Grote, 1864) – ironweed borer
- Papaipema circumlucens (Smith, 1899) – hops stalk borer
- Papaipema dribi Barnes & Benjamin, 1926 – rare borer
- Papaipema duovata (Bird, 1902) – seaside goldenrod borer
- Papaipema duplicatus Bird, 1908 (alternative spelling Papaipema duplicata) – dark stoneroot borer
- Papaipema eryngii Bird, 1917 – rattlesnake-master borer
- Papaipema eupatorii (Lyman, 1905) – Joe-Pye-weed borer or eupatorium
- Papaipema furcata (Smith, 1899) – ash tip borer
- Papaipema harrisii (Grote, 1881) – heracleum stem borer
- Papaipema impecuniosa (Grote, 1881) – aster borer
- Papaipema inquaesita (Grote & Robinson, 1868) – sensitive fern borer
- Papaipema insulidens (Bird, 1902) – ragwort stem borer
- Papaipema leucostigma (Harris, 1841) – columbine borer
- Papaipema limata Bird, 1908
- Papaipema limpida (Guenée, 1852) – vernonia borer
- Papaipema lysimachiae Bird, 1914 – loosestrife borer
- Papaipema marginidens (Guenée, 1852) – brick-red borer
- Papaipema maritima Bird, 1909 – giant sunflower borer or maritime borer
- Papaipema nebris (Guenée, 1852) – stalk borer
- Papaipema necopina (Grote, 1876) – sunflower borer
- Papaipema nelita (Strecker, 1898) – coneflower borer
- Papaipema nepheleptena (Dyar, 1908) – turtle head borer
- Papaipema pertincta Dyar, 1920 – groundsel borer
- Papaipema polymniae Bird, 1917 – cup plant borer
- Papaipema pterisii Bird, 1907 – bracken borer
- Papaipema rigida (Grote, 1877) – rigid sunflower borer
- Papaipema rutila (Guenée, 1852) – mayapple borer
- Papaipema sauzalitae (Grote, 1875) – figwort stem borer
- Papaipema sciata Bird, 1908 – Culver's-root borer
- Papaipema silphii Bird, 1915 – silphius borer
- Papaipema speciosissima (Grote & Robinson, 1868) – osmunda borer or regal fern borer
- Papaipema stenocelis (Dyar, 1907) – chain fern borer
- Papaipema sulphurata Bird, 1926 – water-willow stem borer
- Papaipema unimoda (Smith, 1894) – meadow-rue borer
- Papaipema verona (Smith, 1899) – verona borer
