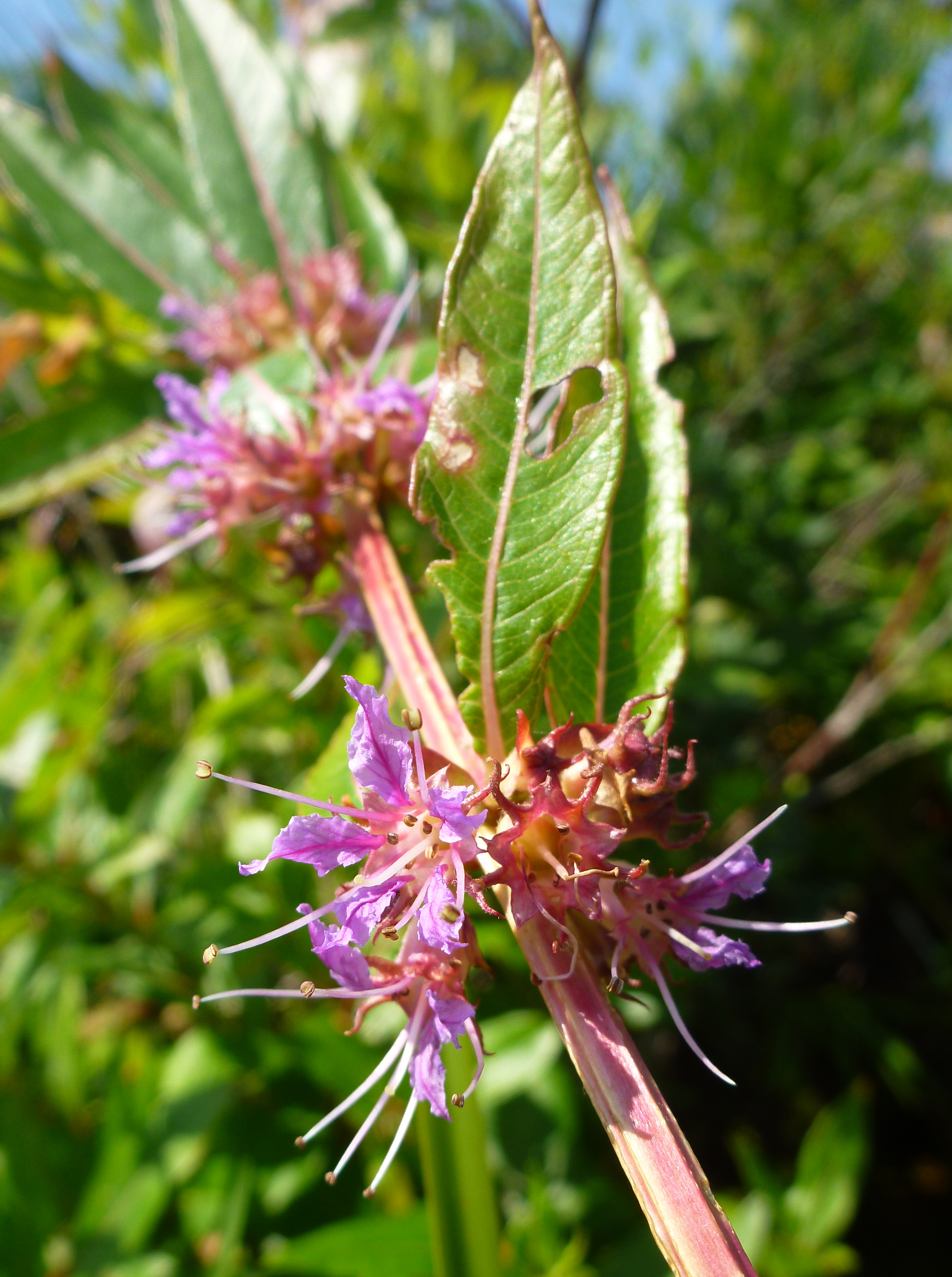

Conservation status
- Least Concern (IUCN 3.1)

Scientific classification
- Kingdom: Plantae
- Clade: Embryophytes
- Clade: Tracheophytes
- Clade: Spermatophytes
- Clade: Angiosperms
- Clade: Eudicots
- Clade: Rosids
- Order: Myrtales
- Family: Lythraceae
- Subfamily: Lythroideae
- Genus: Decodon; J.F.Gmel.
- Species: D. verticillatus

Binomial name
- Decodon verticillatus (L.) Elliott

= Decodon verticillatus =

Species of flowering plant

Decodon verticillatus, the sole living species in the genus Decodon, is a flowering plant in the family Lythraceae. It is commonly known as waterwillow or swamp loosestrife. It is native to wetlands in the eastern half of the United States and Canada.

== Description ==
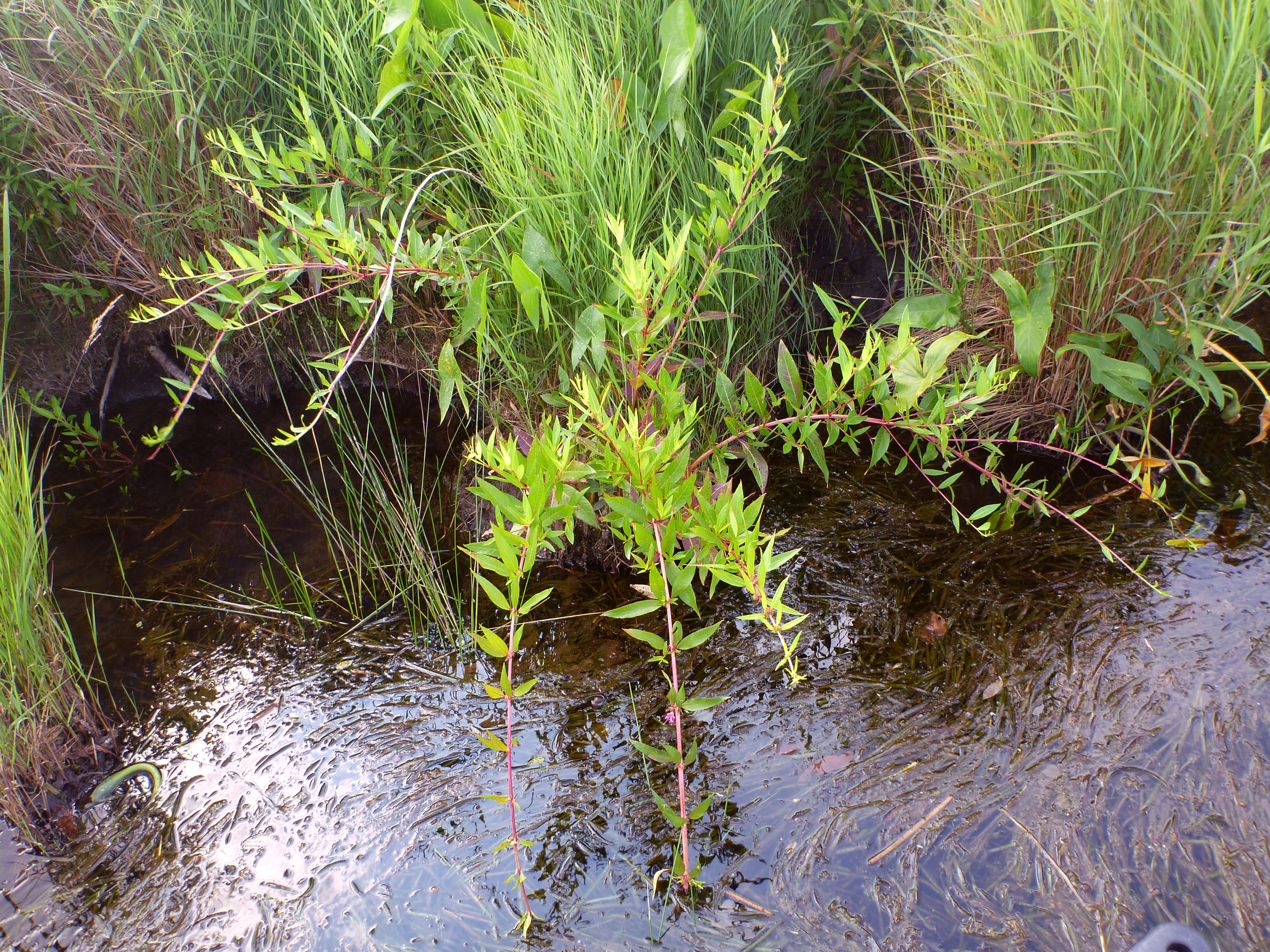
Typical arching habit of Decodon verticillatus.

Waterwillow is a clump-forming shrubby perennial that grows in swamps or shallow water. The stems are arching, angular, smooth and woody near the base, and up to eight feet (2.4 m) tall. They sometimes root at the tip when they bow over and touch the mud. The leaves are lanceolate, either in opposite pairs or in whorls of three or four. They are up to five inches (130 mm) long and one inch (25 mm) wide, smooth above and hairy beneath, on very short stalks. The rose-pink flowers grow in axillary clusters. The calyx is cup shaped, the corolla under one inch (25 mm) wide with usually five petals narrowing at the base. The ten stamens are projecting with five longer than the rest. There is one pistil, one style and a superior ovary. The fruit is a spherical dark brown capsule with numerous reddish seeds. Flowering takes place in June and July.

== Habitat ==
Waterwillow is found in swampland, in ditches, besides streams and in shallow water at the edges of ponds and lakes. It often forms thickets and occurs in the United States from Maine to Florida and west to Minnesota, Tennessee and Louisiana, as well as in eastern Canada.

== Fossil record ==
Seeds of Decodon from the late Campanian (73.5 MA) of northern Mexico are the earliest fossil record of the genus. A "whole plant" description has been give for the Ypresian age Decodon allenbyensis described from the Eocene Okanagan Highlands Princeton Chert site. Seeds of the genus are known in Europe from Pliocene to lower Pleistocene. These seeds are assigned to an extinct species, D. globosus. A seed very similar to the modern American species has been found in sediments from Ipswichian in Ireland, and it is possible that the plant survived until the last interglacial in western Europe.

== Associated species ==
- The larva of the hydrangea sphinx, Darapsa versicolor, feeds on waterwillow.
- The larva of the waterwillow stem borer moth, Papaipema sulphurata, feeds on waterwillow.
