= Papaipema aerata =

Scientific classification
- Domain: Eukaryota
- Kingdom: Animalia
- Phylum: Arthropoda
- Class: Insecta
- Order: Lepidoptera
- Superfamily: Noctuoidea
- Family: Noctuidae
- Tribe: Apameini
- Genus: Papaipema
- Species: P. aerata

Binomial name
- Papaipema aerata (Lyman, 1901)

Species of moth

Papaipema aerata, the slender salsify, is a species of cutworm or dart moth in the family Noctuidae. It is found in North America.

The MONA or Hodges number for Papaipema aerata is 9468.
