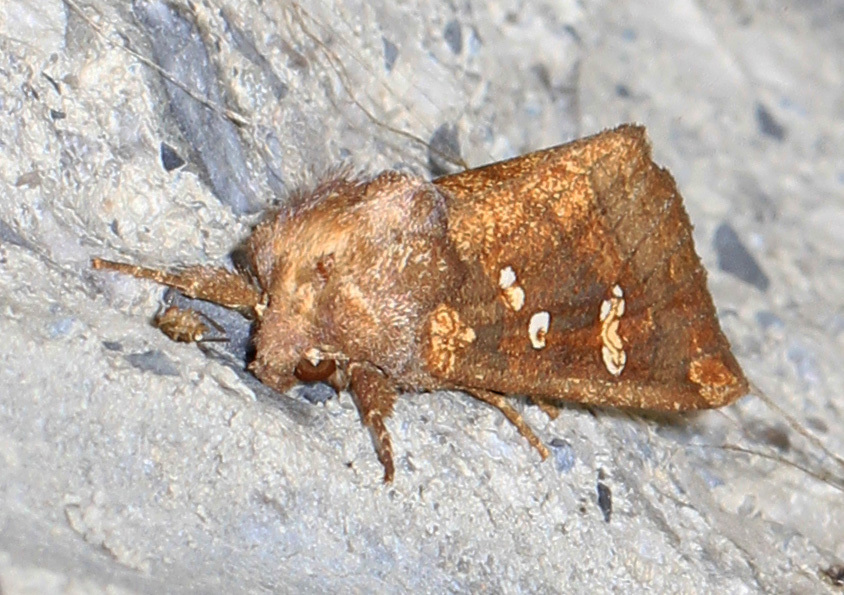
- Adult

Scientific classification
- Domain: Eukaryota
- Kingdom: Animalia
- Phylum: Arthropoda
- Class: Insecta
- Order: Lepidoptera
- Superfamily: Noctuoidea
- Family: Noctuidae
- Genus: Papaipema
- Species: P. duovata

Binomial name
- Papaipema duovata (Bird, 1902)

Synonyms
- Hydroecia duovata Bird, 1902

= Papaipema duovata =

Species of moth

Papaipema duovata, the seaside goldenrod stem borer or seaside goldenrod borer, is a moth that is native to North America, where it is found in the coastal plain from the gulf coast north to at least New Jersey. The species is listed as threatened in Connecticut. It was described by Henry Bird in 1902.

The wingspan is about 36 mm. Adults are dusky brown, with white reniform, orbicular and claviform spots and dull yellow basal spots. Adults are mainly on wing in October.

The larvae bore into Solidago sempervirens.
