= Papaipema beeriana =

Scientific classification
- Domain: Eukaryota
- Kingdom: Animalia
- Phylum: Arthropoda
- Class: Insecta
- Order: Lepidoptera
- Superfamily: Noctuoidea
- Family: Noctuidae
- Tribe: Apameini
- Genus: Papaipema
- Species: P. beeriana

Binomial name
- Papaipema beeriana Bird, 1923

Species of moth

Papaipema beeriana, known generally as blazing star borer moth, is a species of cutworm or dart moth in the family Noctuidae. Other common names include the blazing star stem borer or liatris borer moth. It is found in North America.

The MONA or Hodges number for Papaipema beeriana is 9508.
