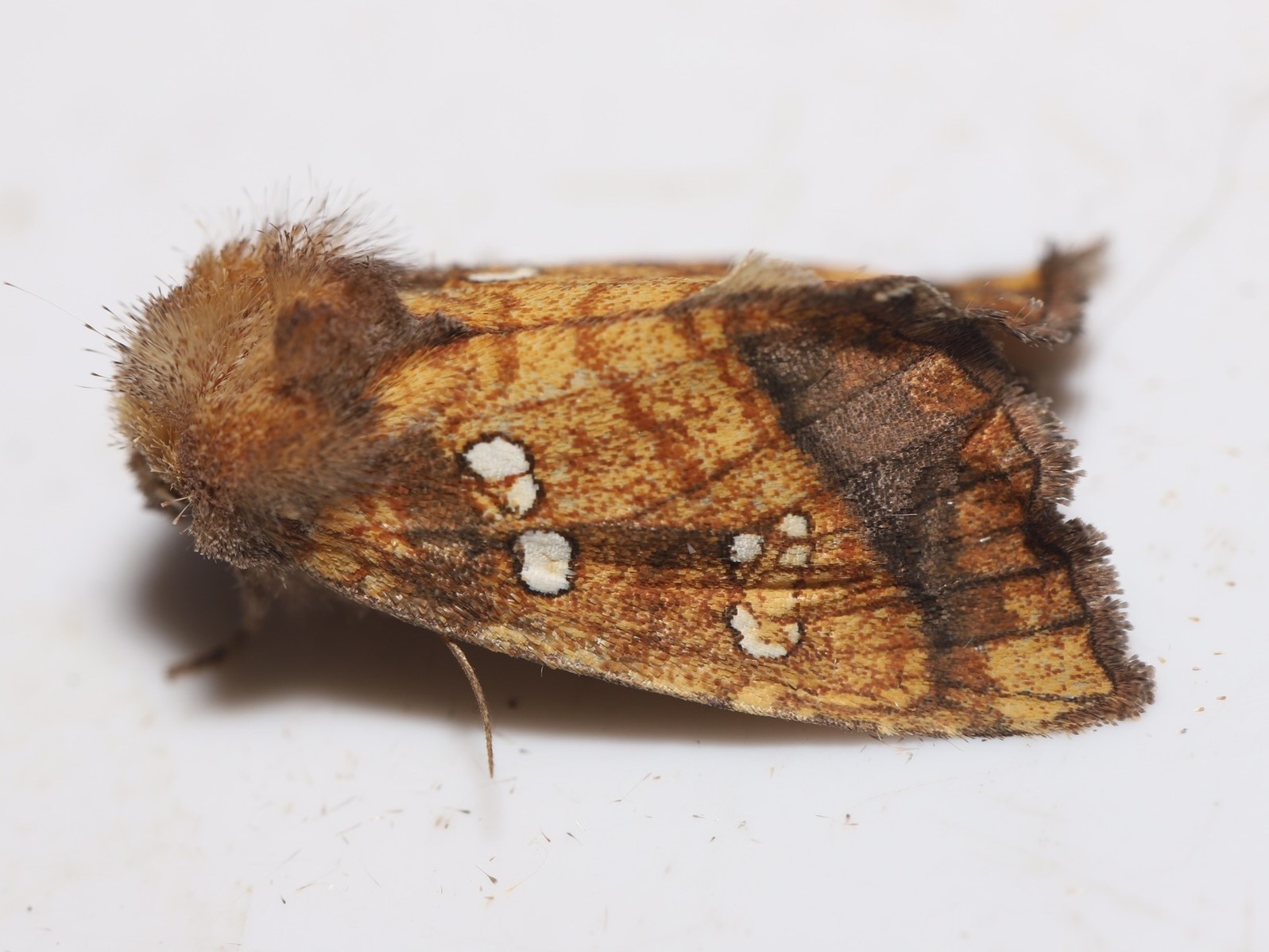

Scientific classification
- Domain: Eukaryota
- Kingdom: Animalia
- Phylum: Arthropoda
- Class: Insecta
- Order: Lepidoptera
- Superfamily: Noctuoidea
- Family: Noctuidae
- Genus: Papaipema
- Species: P. pterisii

Binomial name
- Papaipema pterisii Bird, 1907

= Papaipema pterisii =

Species of moth

Papaipema pterisii, the bracken borer moth, is a species of cutworm or dart moth in the family Noctuidae. It is found in North America.
