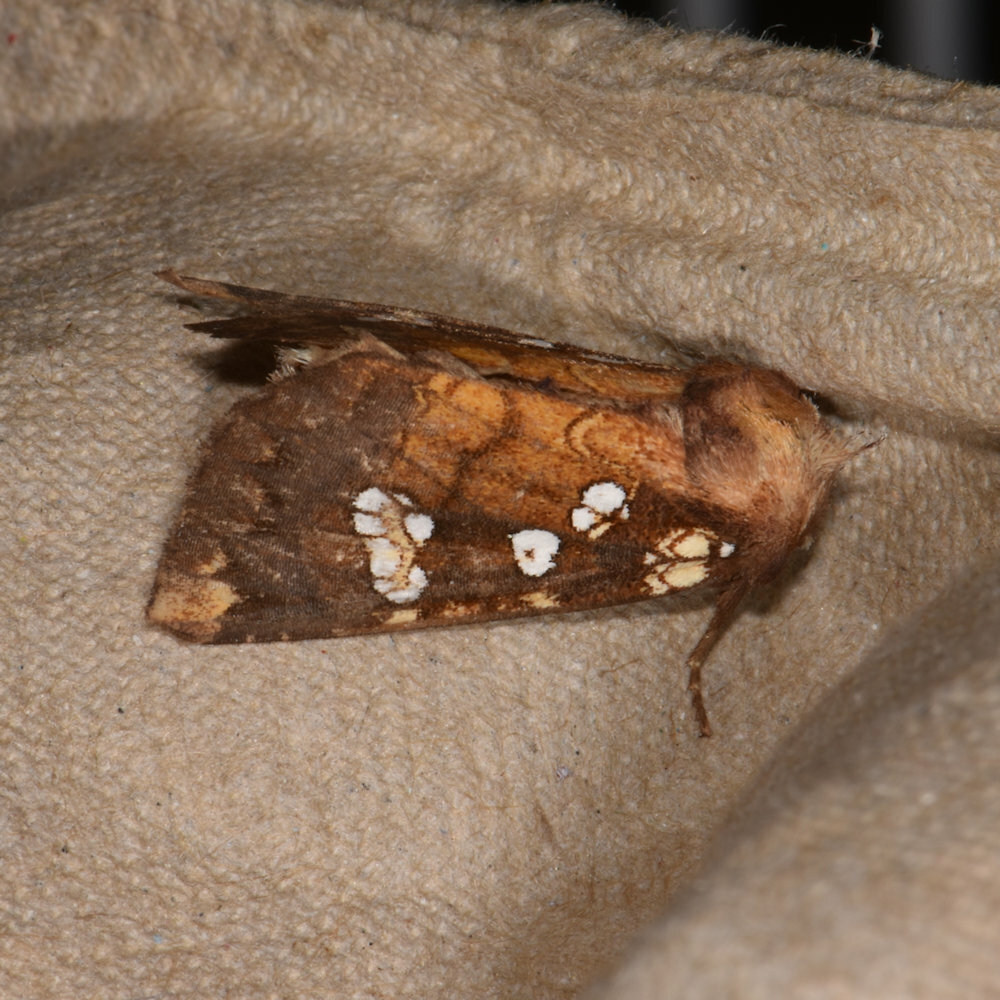
- Papaipema insulidens, Canada

Scientific classification
- Domain: Eukaryota
- Kingdom: Animalia
- Phylum: Arthropoda
- Class: Insecta
- Order: Lepidoptera
- Superfamily: Noctuoidea
- Family: Noctuidae
- Tribe: Apameini
- Genus: Papaipema
- Species: P. insulidens

Binomial name
- Papaipema insulidens (Bird, 1902)

= Papaipema insulidens =

Species of moth

Papaipema insulidens, the ragwort stem borer moth, is a species of cutworm or dart moth in the family Noctuidae. It is found in North America.

The MONA or Hodges number for Papaipema insulidens is 9488.
