= Papaipema leucostigma =

Scientific classification
- Domain: Eukaryota
- Kingdom: Animalia
- Phylum: Arthropoda
- Class: Insecta
- Order: Lepidoptera
- Superfamily: Noctuoidea
- Family: Noctuidae
- Genus: Papaipema
- Species: P. leucostigma

Binomial name
- Papaipema leucostigma (Harris, 1841)

Synonyms
- Gortyna leucostigma Harris, 1841; Gortyna purpurifascia Grote & Robinson, 1868; Papaipema luteipicta Strand, 1916

Species of moth

Papaipema leucostigma, the columbine borer, is a species of moth described by Thaddeus William Harris in 1841 and found in eastern North America. It is listed as endangered in the US state of Connecticut. The larvae feed on Aquilegia, common referred to as columbine.
