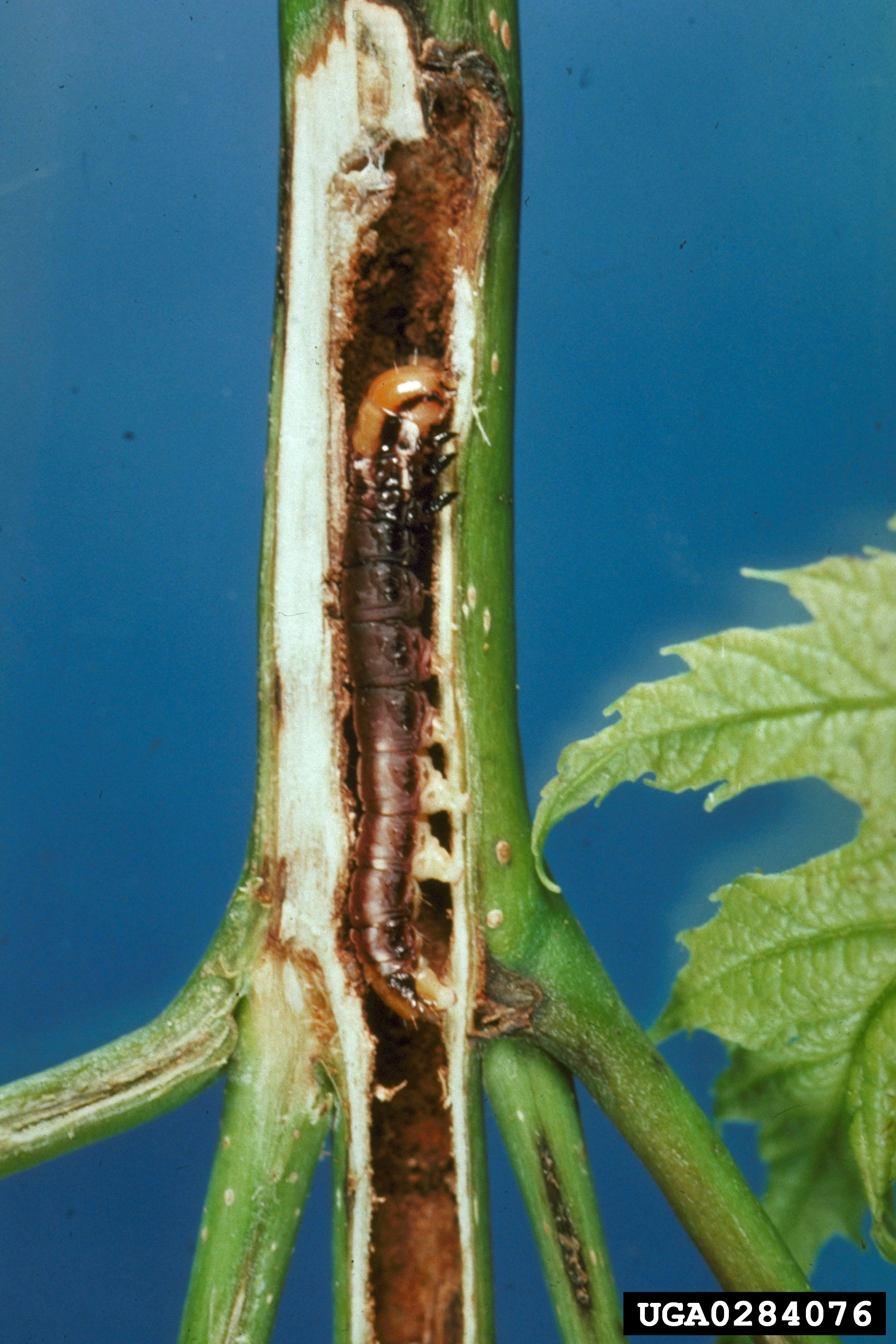

Scientific classification
- Domain: Eukaryota
- Kingdom: Animalia
- Phylum: Arthropoda
- Class: Insecta
- Order: Lepidoptera
- Superfamily: Noctuoidea
- Family: Noctuidae
- Genus: Papaipema
- Species: P. nebris

Binomial name
- Papaipema nebris Guenée, 1852

Synonyms
- Gortyna nebris; Gortyna nitela; Papaipema nitella

= Stalk borer =

Species of moth

The stalk borer (Papaipema nebris) is a moth of the family Noctuidae. It is found from southern Canada, through the Eastern United States (East of the Rocky Mountains) to the Gulf of Mexico, although it is absent from Florida.

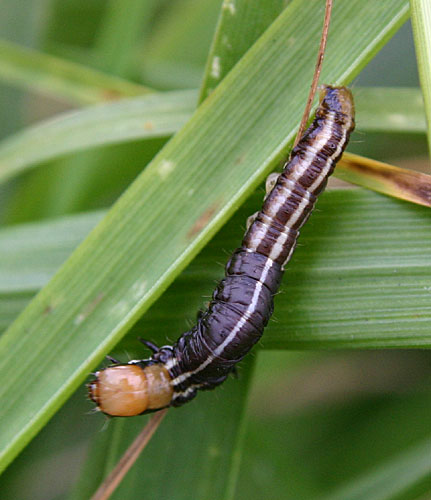

This wingspan is 25–44 mm. The moth flies from June to September depending on the location.

The larvae are considered a pest of corn but also feed on various other large-stemmed plants, such as Ambrosia trifida.
