= Papaipema birdi =

Umbellifer borer

Scientific classification
- Domain: Eukaryota
- Kingdom: Animalia
- Phylum: Arthropoda
- Class: Insecta
- Order: Lepidoptera
- Superfamily: Noctuoidea
- Family: Noctuidae
- Genus: Papaipema
- Species: P. birdi

Binomial name
- Papaipema birdi (Dyar, 1908)

Synonyms
- Gortyna birdi Dyar, 1908

Species of moth

Papaipema birdi, the umbellifer borer, is a species of moth of the family Noctuidae. It is found from Quebec to Alberta and south in the east to New Jersey.

The wingspan is about 32 mm. Adults are on wing from August to October.

The larvae feed on Cicuta maculata, Angelica atropurpurea, and Sium suave. They bore in the stems of their host plant.
