= Papaipema maritima =

Scientific classification
- Domain: Eukaryota
- Kingdom: Animalia
- Phylum: Arthropoda
- Class: Insecta
- Order: Lepidoptera
- Superfamily: Noctuoidea
- Family: Noctuidae
- Genus: Papaipema
- Species: P. maritima

Binomial name
- Papaipema maritima Bird, 1909

Species of moth

Papaipema maritima, the maritime sunflower borer moth, is a species of moth found in North America. The species was first described by Henry Bird in 1909. The larvae bore into the stems of Helianthus giganteus, forming a stem gall. It is listed as a species of special concern and believed extirpated in the US state of Connecticut.
