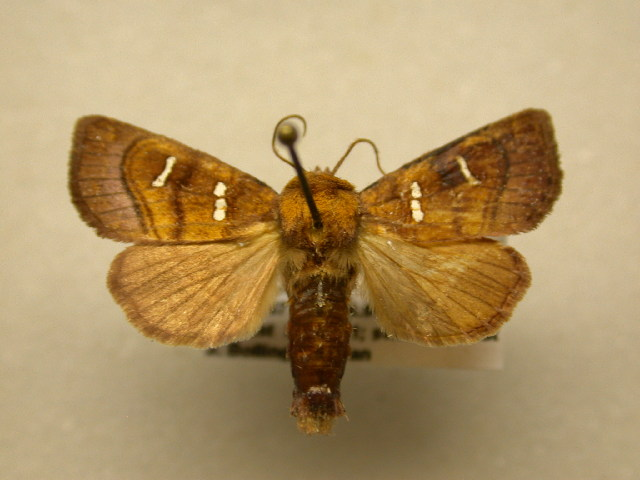

Scientific classification
- Domain: Eukaryota
- Kingdom: Animalia
- Phylum: Arthropoda
- Class: Insecta
- Order: Lepidoptera
- Superfamily: Noctuoidea
- Family: Noctuidae
- Genus: Papaipema
- Species: P. stenocelis

Binomial name
- Papaipema stenocelis (Dyar, 1907)

= Papaipema stenocelis =

Species of moth

Papaipema stenocelis, the chain fern borer, is a species of cutworm or dart moth in the family Noctuidae. It is found in North America.

The MONA or Hodges number for Papaipema stenocelis is 9481.
