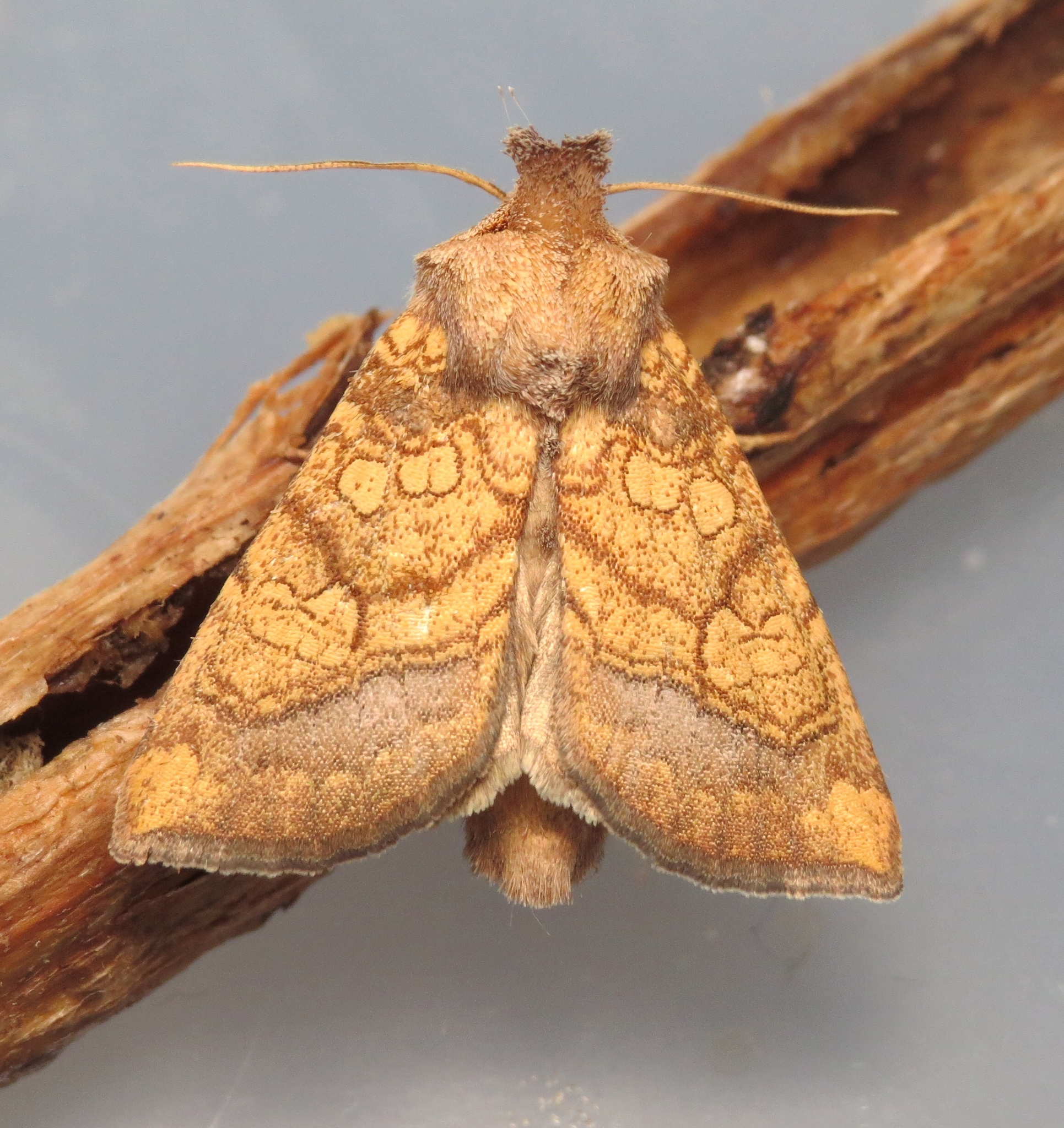

Conservation status
- Imperiled (NatureServe)

Scientific classification
- Domain: Eukaryota
- Kingdom: Animalia
- Phylum: Arthropoda
- Class: Insecta
- Order: Lepidoptera
- Superfamily: Noctuoidea
- Family: Noctuidae
- Genus: Papaipema
- Species: P. sulphurata

Binomial name
- Papaipema sulphurata Bird, 1926

Synonyms
- Papaipema cataphracta var. sulphurata Bird, 1926

= Papaipema sulphurata =

Water-willow stem borer

Species of moth

The water-willow stem borer or Decodon stem borer moth (Papaipema sulphurata) is a moth of the family Noctuidae. Its larvae tunnel into the stems of the water-willow plant (Decodon verticillatus). It is endemic to Massachusetts in the United States of America.

== Description ==
The water-willow stem borer is a robustly built moth with a greyish hairy body. It has a wingspan varying from 32 to 38 millimetres. The forewings are buff or straw-coloured, darker at the base and in the peripheral region which is separated by a narrow dark band. There are a number of roughly circular spots which are a pale ochre colour, outlined in brown. The hind wings are an orangish tan colour. The adults can be seen flying in September and October.

== Habitat ==
This moth is narrowly endemic to southeast Massachusetts, Martha's Vineyard and the Nantucket Islands. It is found in wetland areas where the water-willow (Decodon verticillatus) grows. Water-willow can be found in swampland, ditches and in shallow water at the edges of ponds, lakes and streams. It often forms tangled clumps and occurs from Maine to Florida and west to Minnesota, Tennessee and Louisiana.

== Life history ==
The adult female lays eggs on the stems of water-willow in September and October. These hatch in the spring and the larvae tunnel into the stem. Here they grow, moulting several times, feeding on the vascular tissue of the plant and creating galleries. They pupate in August or September, undergo metamorphosis and emerge as adults within a month.
