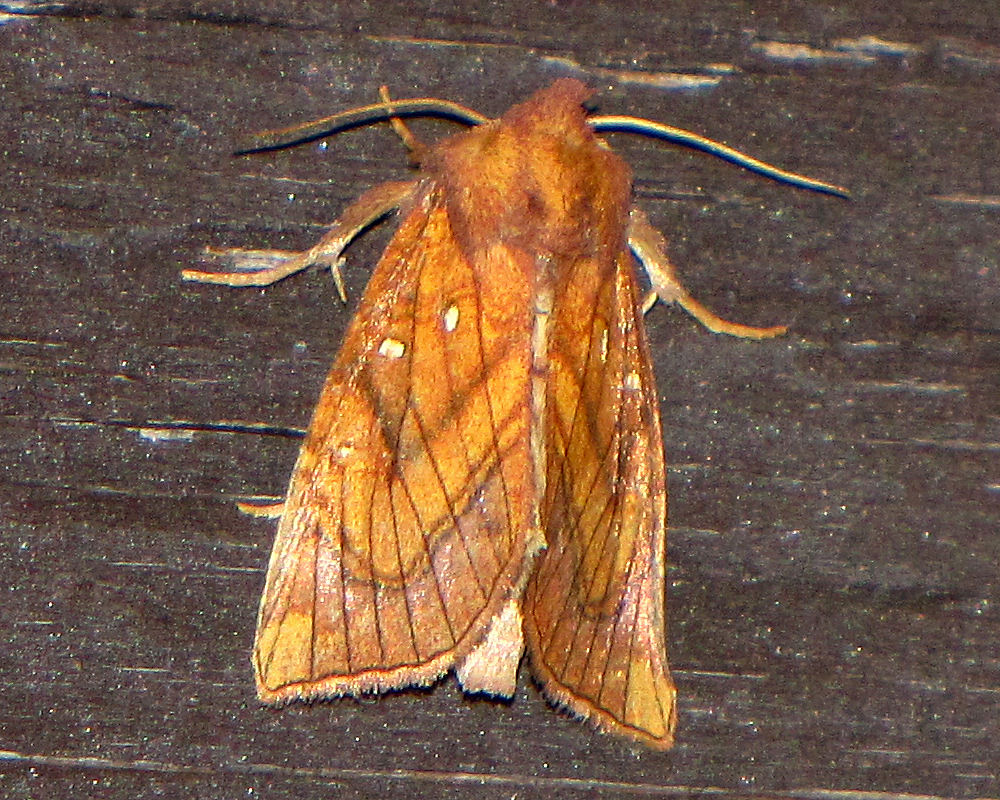
- Cup Plant Borer Moth (Papaipema polymniae), Cantley, Quebec, Canada

Scientific classification
- Domain: Eukaryota
- Kingdom: Animalia
- Phylum: Arthropoda
- Class: Insecta
- Order: Lepidoptera
- Superfamily: Noctuoidea
- Family: Noctuidae
- Genus: Papaipema
- Species: P. polymniae

Binomial name
- Papaipema polymniae Bird, 1917

= Papaipema polymniae =

Cup Plant Borer

Species of moth

The cup plant borer (Papaipema polymniae) is a species of moth of the family Noctuidae. It is found in North America, including Virginia, Massachusetts and New Hampshire.

The wingspan is about 40 mm.

The larvae feed on Polymnia uvedalis.
