= Papaipema araliae =

Scientific classification
- Domain: Eukaryota
- Kingdom: Animalia
- Phylum: Arthropoda
- Class: Insecta
- Order: Lepidoptera
- Superfamily: Noctuoidea
- Family: Noctuidae
- Tribe: Apameini
- Genus: Papaipema
- Species: P. araliae

Binomial name
- Papaipema araliae Bird & Jones, 1921

Species of moth

Papaipema araliae, known generally as the aralia shoot borer moth or hedge veronica, is a species of cutworm or dart moth in the family Noctuidae. It is found in North America.

The MONA or Hodges number for Papaipema araliae is 9470.
