= Papaipema aweme =

Conservation status
- Vulnerable (NatureServe)

Scientific classification
- Kingdom: Animalia
- Phylum: Arthropoda
- Clade: Pancrustacea
- Class: Insecta
- Order: Lepidoptera
- Superfamily: Noctuoidea
- Family: Noctuidae
- Tribe: Apameini
- Genus: Papaipema
- Species: P. aweme

Binomial name
- Papaipema aweme (Lyman, 1908)

Species of moth

Papaipema aweme, commonly known as the Aweme borer moth or small white-aster moth, is a species of cutworm or dart moth in the family Noctuidae. It is found in North America.

The MONA or Hodges number for Papaipema aweme is 9504.
