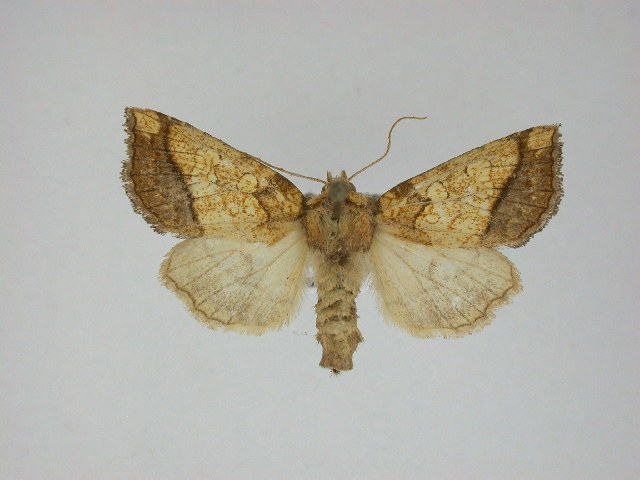

Scientific classification
- Kingdom: Animalia
- Phylum: Arthropoda
- Clade: Pancrustacea
- Class: Insecta
- Order: Lepidoptera
- Superfamily: Noctuoidea
- Family: Noctuidae
- Genus: Papaipema
- Species: P. rigida

Binomial name
- Papaipema rigida (Grote, 1877)

= Papaipema rigida =

Species of moth

Papaipema rigida, the rigid sunflower borer, is a species of cutworm or dart moth in the family Noctuidae. It is found in North America.
