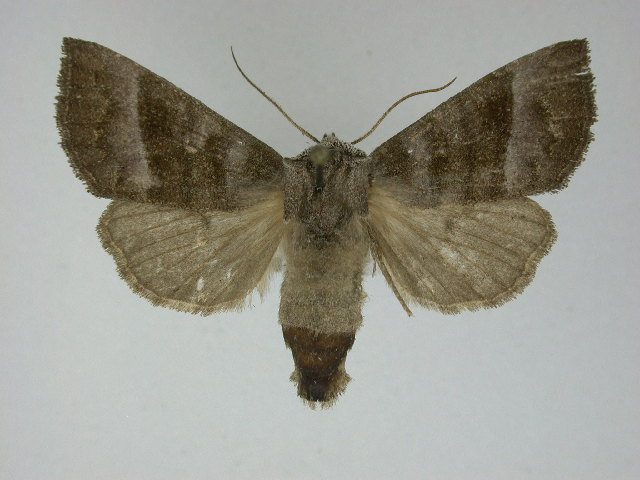

Scientific classification
- Domain: Eukaryota
- Kingdom: Animalia
- Phylum: Arthropoda
- Class: Insecta
- Order: Lepidoptera
- Superfamily: Noctuoidea
- Family: Noctuidae
- Tribe: Apameini
- Genus: Papaipema
- Species: P. eupatorii

Binomial name
- Papaipema eupatorii (Lyman, 1905)

= Papaipema eupatorii =

Species of moth

Papaipema eupatorii, known generally as the Joe-Pye-weed borer or eupatorium borer, is a species of cutworm or dart moth in the family Noctuidae. It is found in North America.

The MONA or Hodges number for Papaipema eupatorii is 9501.
