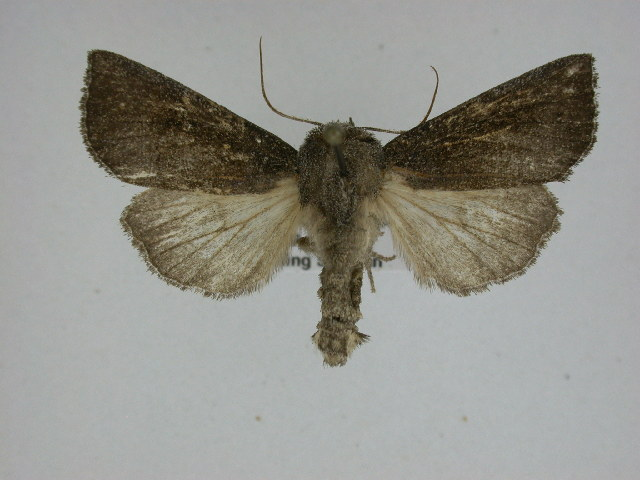

Scientific classification
- Domain: Eukaryota
- Kingdom: Animalia
- Phylum: Arthropoda
- Class: Insecta
- Order: Lepidoptera
- Superfamily: Noctuoidea
- Family: Noctuidae
- Genus: Papaipema
- Species: P. necopina

Binomial name
- Papaipema necopina (Grote, 1876)

= Papaipema necopina =

Species of moth

Papaipema necopina, the sunflower borer moth, is a species of cutworm or dart moth in the family Noctuidae. It is found in North America.

The MONA or Hodges number for Papaipema necopina is 9497.
