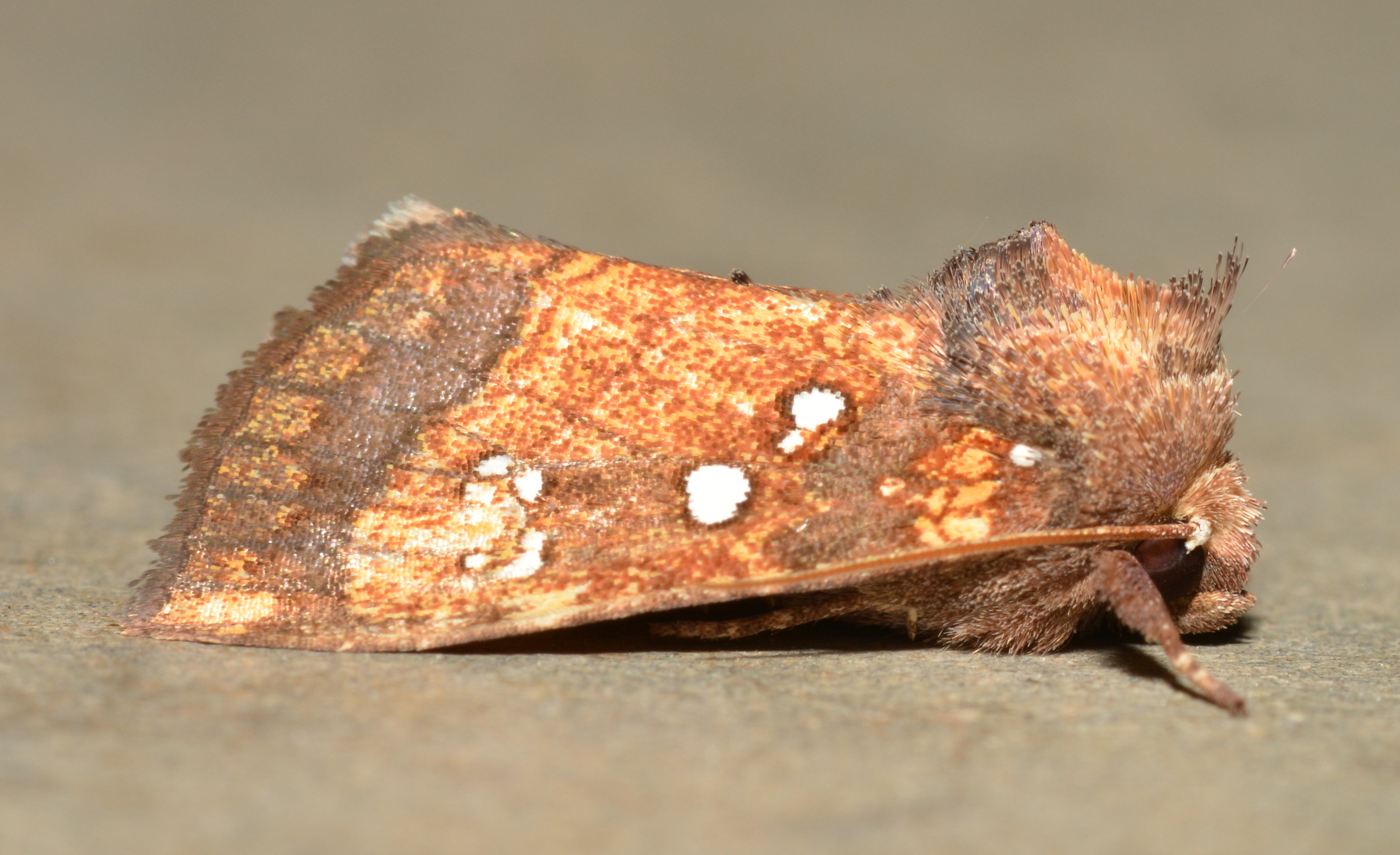

Scientific classification
- Domain: Eukaryota
- Kingdom: Animalia
- Phylum: Arthropoda
- Class: Insecta
- Order: Lepidoptera
- Superfamily: Noctuoidea
- Family: Noctuidae
- Genus: Papaipema
- Species: P. arctivorens

Binomial name
- Papaipema arctivorens Hampson, 1910

Synonyms
- Papaipema artivorens

= Papaipema arctivorens =

Northern burdock borer

Species of moth

Papaipema arctivorens, the northern burdock borer, is a species of moth of the family Noctuidae. It is found from Quebec to northern Georgia, west to Missouri and north to Minnesota and Ontario.

The wingspan is 27–39 mm.

The larvae feed on Arctium, Cirsium, Dipsacus, and sometimes Verbena and Verbascum species.
