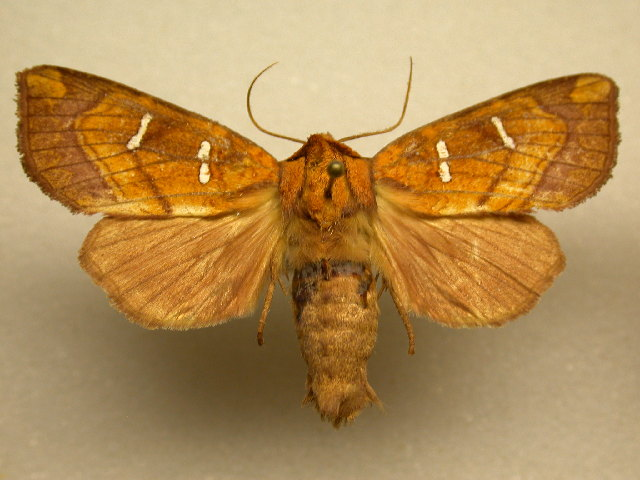

Scientific classification
- Domain: Eukaryota
- Kingdom: Animalia
- Phylum: Arthropoda
- Class: Insecta
- Order: Lepidoptera
- Superfamily: Noctuoidea
- Family: Noctuidae
- Genus: Papaipema
- Species: P. speciosissima

Binomial name
- Papaipema speciosissima (Grote & Robinson, 1868)

= Papaipema speciosissima =

Species of moth

Papaipema speciosissima, the osmunda borer or regal fern borer, is a species of cutworm or dart moth in the family Noctuidae. It was described by Augustus Radcliffe Grote and Coleman Townsend Robinson in 1868 and is found in North America.

The MONA or Hodges number for Papaipema speciosissima is 9482.
