= Papaipema nepheleptena =

Scientific classification
- Kingdom: Animalia
- Phylum: Arthropoda
- Clade: Pancrustacea
- Class: Insecta
- Order: Lepidoptera
- Superfamily: Noctuoidea
- Family: Noctuidae
- Genus: Papaipema
- Species: P. nepheleptena

Binomial name
- Papaipema nepheleptena (Dyar, 1908)

Species of moth

Papaipema nepheleptena, the turtle head borer moth, is a species of cutworm or dart moth in the family Noctuidae. It is found in North America.
