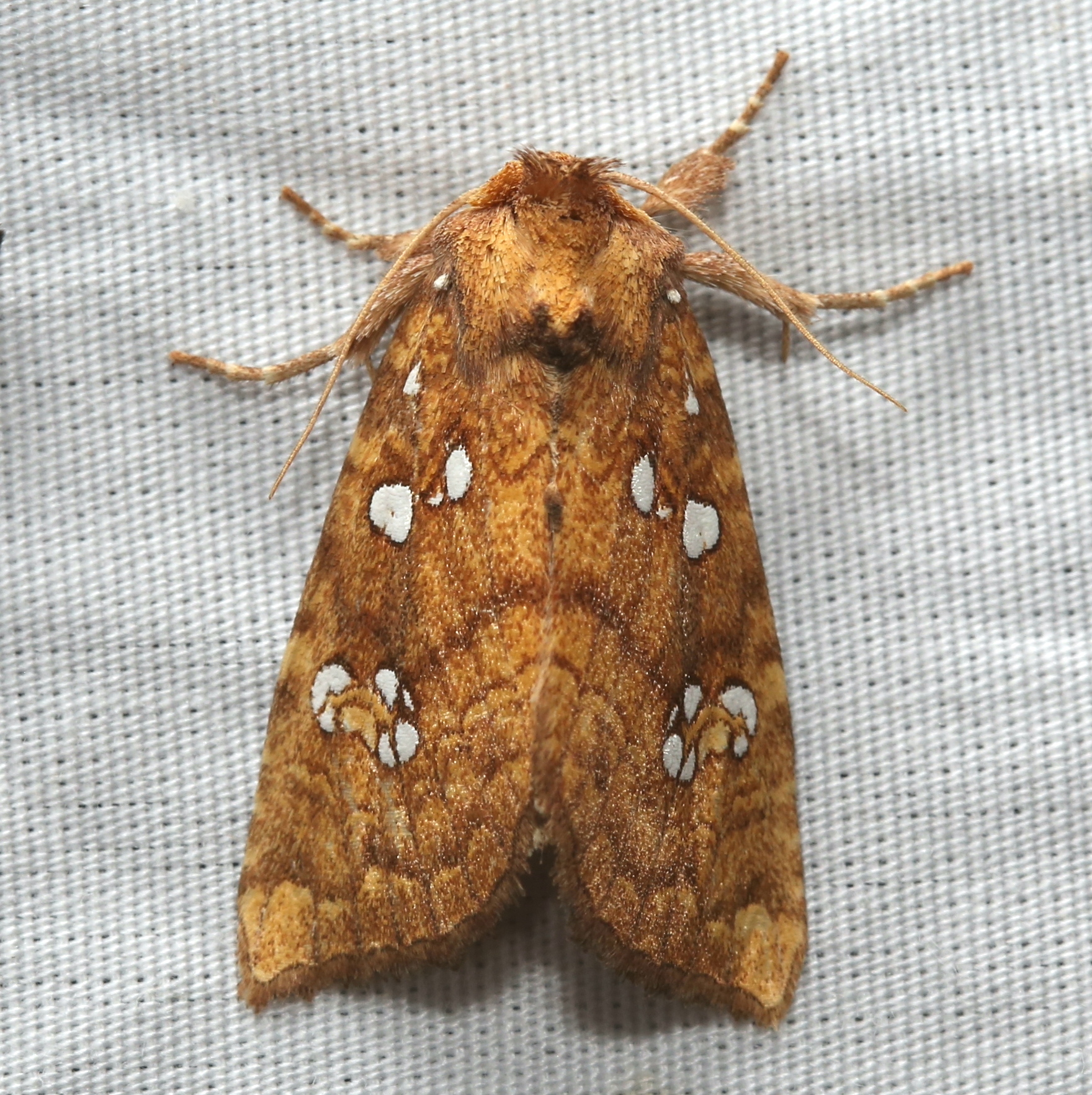

Scientific classification
- Kingdom: Animalia
- Phylum: Arthropoda
- Class: Insecta
- Order: Lepidoptera
- Superfamily: Noctuoidea
- Family: Noctuidae
- Genus: Papaipema
- Species: P. furcata

Binomial name
- Papaipema furcata (Smith, 1899)

Synonyms
- Hydroecia furcata Smith, 1899

= Papaipema furcata =

Ash Tip Borer

Species of moth

The ash tip borer (Papaipema furcata) is a species of moth of the family Noctuidae. It is found from Quebec and New Hampshire to Georgia, west to Louisiana and north to Manitoba.

The wingspan is about 33–49 mm. Adults are on wing from August to October.

The larvae feed on Fraxinus species and Acer negundo. They bore into the twigs of their host plant.
