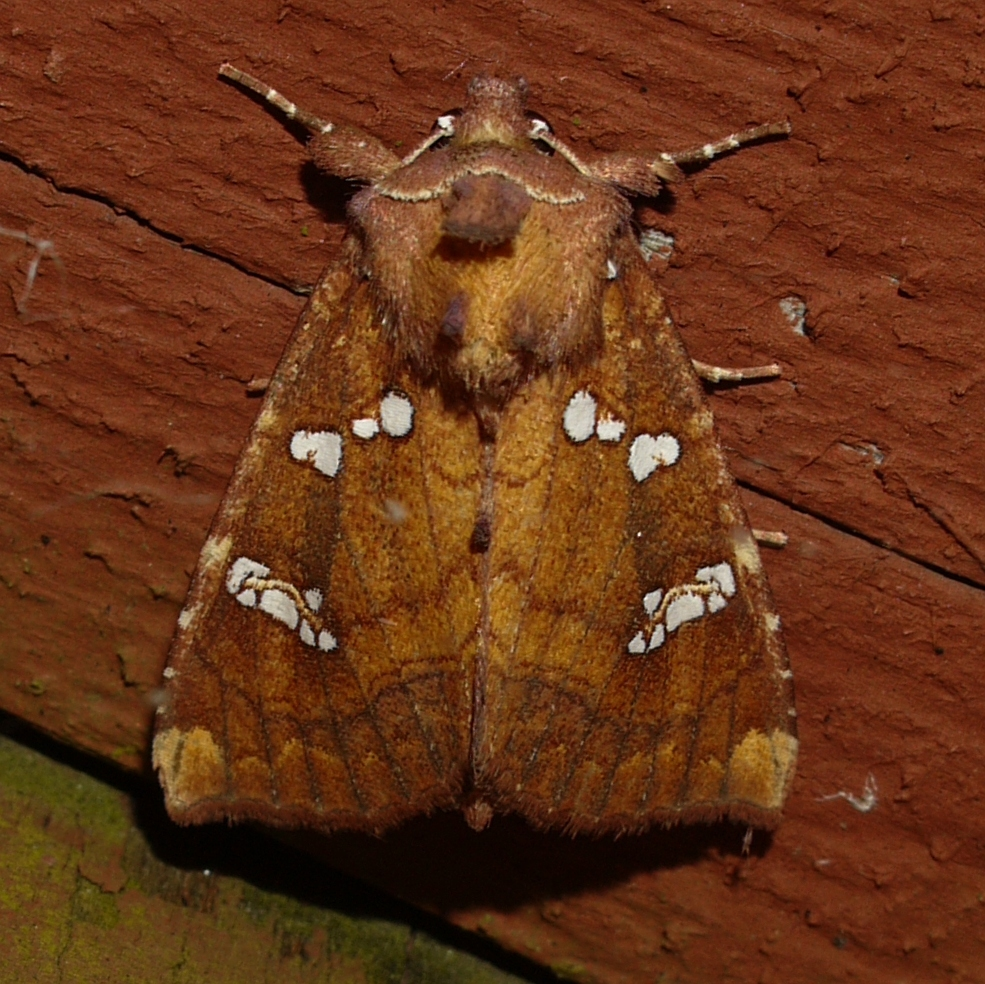

Scientific classification
- Domain: Eukaryota
- Kingdom: Animalia
- Phylum: Arthropoda
- Class: Insecta
- Order: Lepidoptera
- Superfamily: Noctuoidea
- Family: Noctuidae
- Genus: Papaipema
- Species: P. circumlucens

Binomial name
- Papaipema circumlucens (Smith, 1899)

Synonyms
- Hydroecia circumlucens Smith, 1899; Gortyna ochroptena Dyar, 1908; Papaipema humuli Bird, 1915

= Papaipema circumlucens =

Species of moth

Papaipema circumlucens, the hops-stalk borer moth, is a species of moth native to North America, where it has been recorded from Illinois, Indiana, Michigan, Missouri, New Hampshire, Ohio, Saskatchewan and Wisconsin. The species was described by Smith in 1899. It is listed as a species of special concern and is believed to be extirpated from the US state of Connecticut.

== Description ==
The wingspan is about 38 mm. Adults are pale stramineous, only slightly tinted with brown, the lines faint and obscure. The ordinary spots are white, with the claviform and orbicular forming an oblique row of three spots, the middle one smallest. The reniform spot has a white central line, and all the surrounding spots are white. The subterminal shade is purplish, defining a yellow apical patch. The hindwings are whitish.
