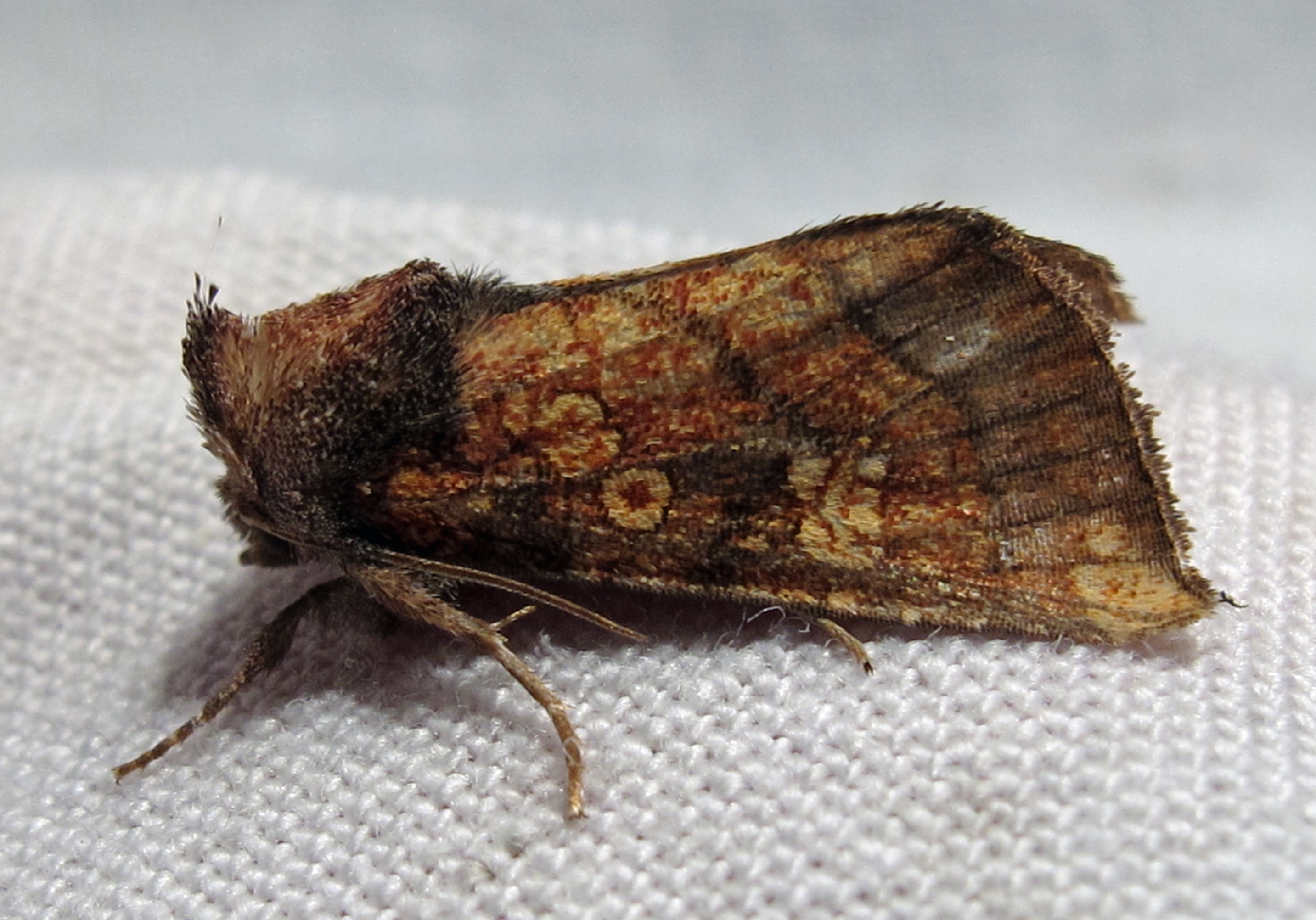

Scientific classification
- Domain: Eukaryota
- Kingdom: Animalia
- Phylum: Arthropoda
- Class: Insecta
- Order: Lepidoptera
- Superfamily: Noctuoidea
- Family: Noctuidae
- Genus: Papaipema
- Species: P. impecuniosa

Binomial name
- Papaipema impecuniosa (Grote, 1881)

Synonyms
- Gortyna impecuniosa Grote, 1881

= Papaipema impecuniosa =

Species of moth

Papaipema impecuniosa, commonly known as the aster borer moth or impecunious borer, is a species of moth in the family Noctuidae. It is found in eastern North America, where it ranges from Nova Scotia to Georgia, west to Illinois and north to Wisconsin and Ontario.

The larvae feed on Aster species and Helenium autumnale. They bore into the stems and roots of their host plant.
