= Papaipema marginidens =

Scientific classification
- Domain: Eukaryota
- Kingdom: Animalia
- Phylum: Arthropoda
- Class: Insecta
- Order: Lepidoptera
- Superfamily: Noctuoidea
- Family: Noctuidae
- Genus: Papaipema
- Species: P. marginidens

Binomial name
- Papaipema marginidens (Guenée, 1852)

Synonyms
- Gortyna marginidens Guenée, 1852; Gortyna nephrasyntheta Dyar, 1908

Species of moth

Papaipema marginidens, the brick-red borer moth, is a species of moth found in North America. It was first described by Achille Guenée in 1852. It is found in eastern North America, from Pennsylvania and New York south to Georgia and North Carolina. It is now listed as endangered in the US state of Connecticut. The habitat consists of a mixture of open oak woodlands and barrens in rocky areas with herbaceous undergrowth- especially along streams.

The wingspan is about 42 mm.

The larvae feed on various herbaceous plants, including Cicuta maculata.
