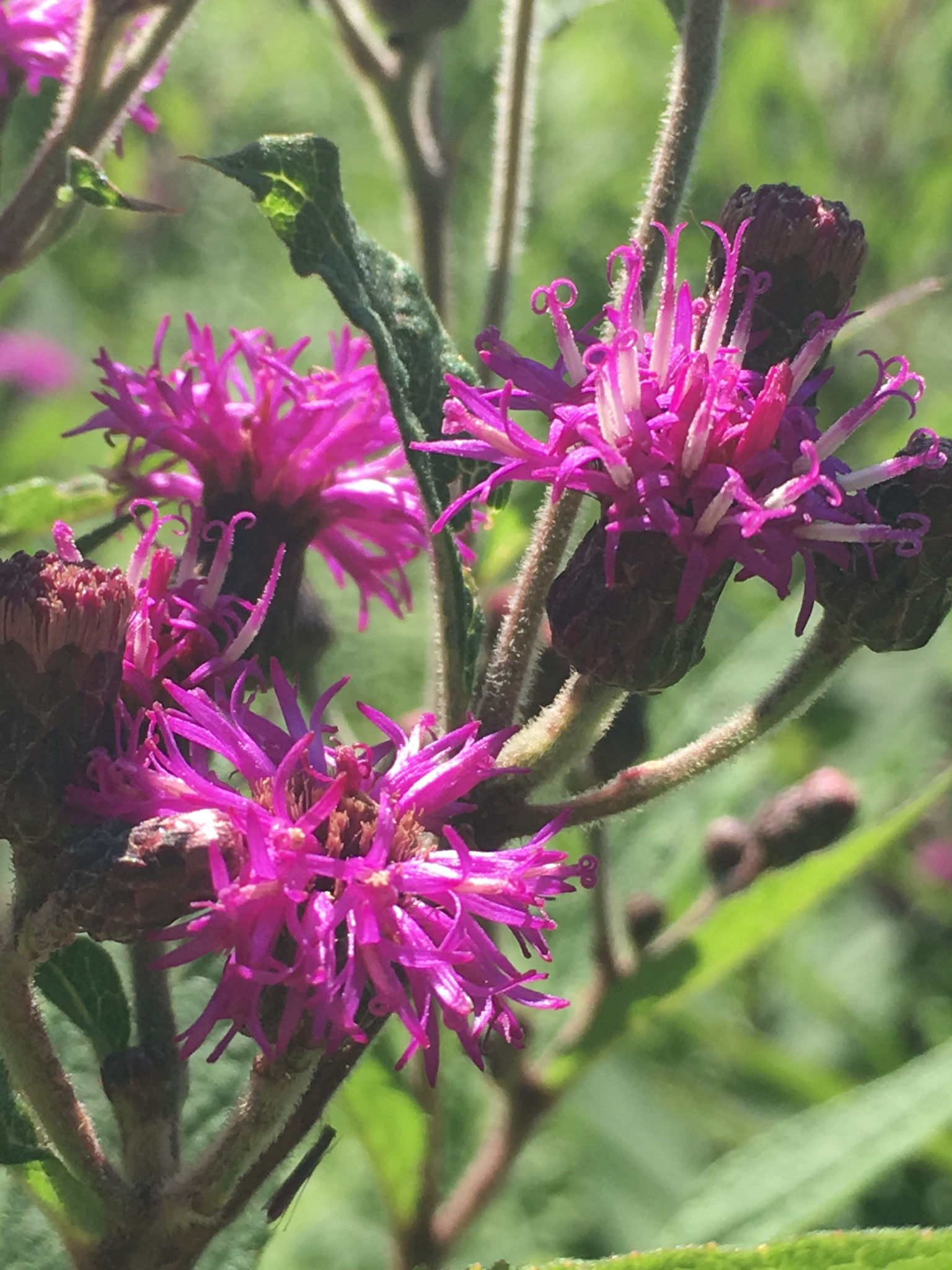

Conservation status
- Apparently Secure (NatureServe)

Scientific classification
- Kingdom: Plantae
- Clade: Tracheophytes
- Clade: Angiosperms
- Clade: Eudicots
- Clade: Asterids
- Order: Asterales
- Family: Asteraceae
- Genus: Vernonia
- Species: V. missurica

Binomial name
- Vernonia missurica Raf.

Synonyms
- Vernonia aborigina Gleason; Vernonia drummondii Shuttlew. ex Werner; Vernonia michiganensis Daniels; Vernonia missurica var. austroriparia Gleason; Vernonia missurica f. carnea Standl.; Vernonia missurica f. swinkii Steyerm.; Vernonia reedii Daniels

= Vernonia missurica =

Species of flowering plant in the family Asteraceae

Vernonia missurica, the Missouri ironweed, is a species of magenta-flowered perennial plant from family Asteraceae native to the central and east central United States.

== Description ==
The plant is 90–150 cm (3–5 ft) in height and 90–120 cm (3–4 ft) in width, and in some cases can exceed up to 180 cm (6 ft). The leaves are dark green in color and alternating.

The flowers of Vernonia missurica bloom in July and August and are magenta with reddish-brown bracts. Each flower head is 100–180 mm (4–7 in) in length and 15 mm (1/2 in) in diameter, with 30–60 disk florets. Vernonia missurica has a central stout stem that is covered with white hairs, and the flowers grow close to each other and have rayless heads. Stems are hairy and reddish-brown.

== Distribution ==
Vernonia missurica is native to the central and east central United States namely Alabama, Arkansas, Georgia, Illinois, Indiana, Iowa, Kansas, Kentucky, Louisiana, Michigan, Mississippi, Missouri, Oklahoma, Tennessee, and Texas.

== Habitat ==
The species grows in river bottom woods, wet prairies, fens, and sedge meadows.

== Ecology ==
Vernonia missurica is typically visited by long-tongued bees, butterflies, and skippers. In the absence of these pollinators, the plant is capable of self-pollinating. It is pollinated by various bees such as members of the genus Bombus (bumblebees), the tribe Epeolini (epeoline cuckoo bees), the family Halictidae (halictid bees), and the genus Andrena (miner bees). Lepidoptera (butterflies), including those of the family Hesperiidae (skippers), are also frequent visitors. Some caterpillars feed on the plant, including the most common guests of Grammia parthenice (Parthenice tiger moth), Perigea xanthioides (red groundling), and Papaipema cerussata (ironweed borer moth). Herbivorous mammals avoid the plant due to its bitter taste.
