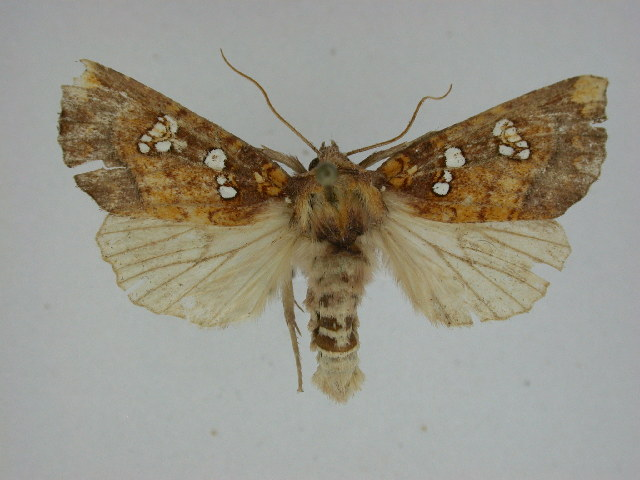

Scientific classification
- Kingdom: Animalia
- Phylum: Arthropoda
- Clade: Pancrustacea
- Class: Insecta
- Order: Lepidoptera
- Superfamily: Noctuoidea
- Family: Noctuidae
- Genus: Papaipema
- Species: P. rutila

Binomial name
- Papaipema rutila (Guenée, 1852)

= Papaipema rutila =

Mayapple borer moth

Species of moth

Papaipema rutila, the mayapple borer moth, is a species of cutworm or dart moth in the family Noctuidae. It is found in North America.
