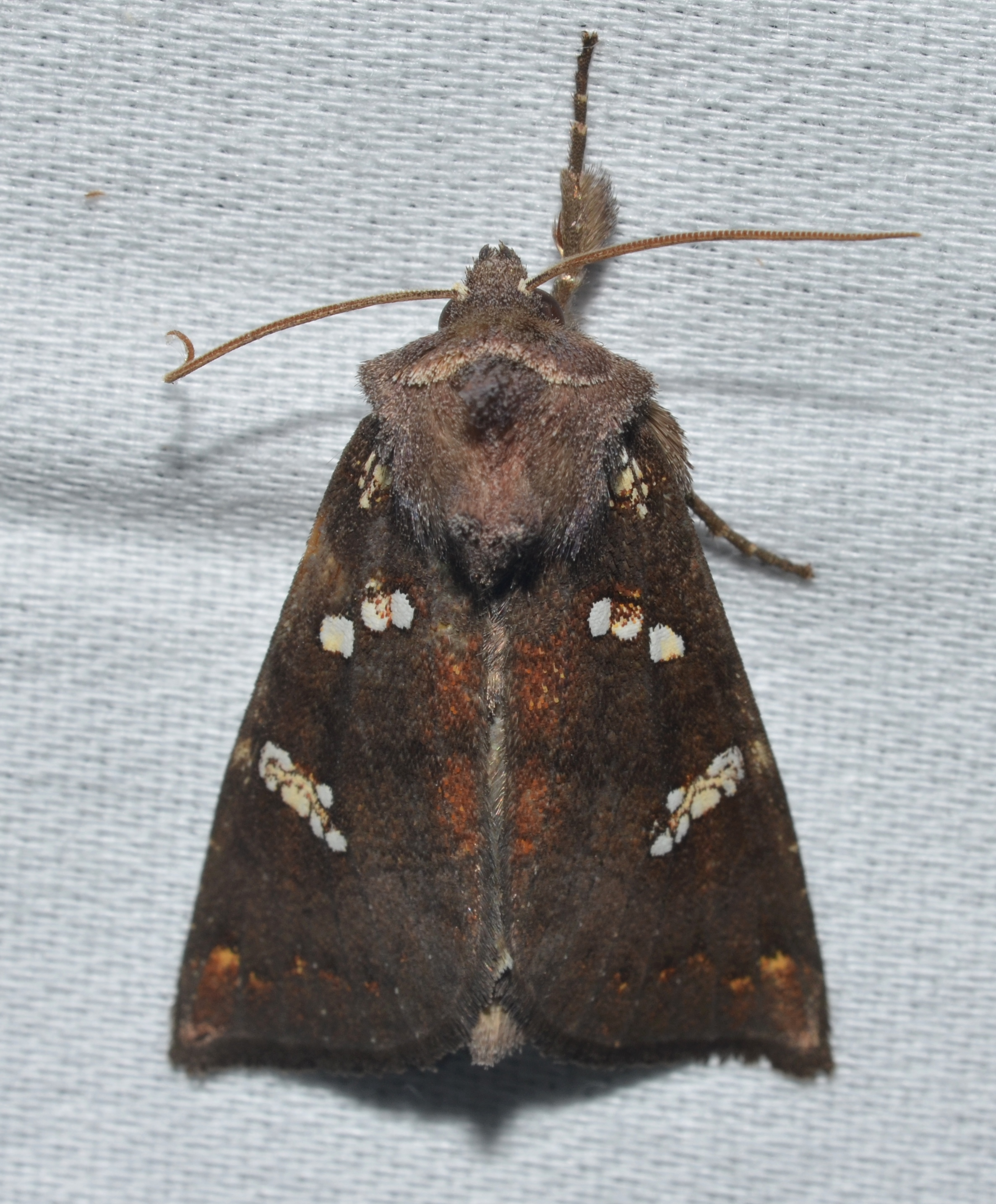

Scientific classification
- Domain: Eukaryota
- Kingdom: Animalia
- Phylum: Arthropoda
- Class: Insecta
- Order: Lepidoptera
- Superfamily: Noctuoidea
- Family: Noctuidae
- Genus: Papaipema
- Species: P. cerussata

Binomial name
- Papaipema cerussata (Grote, 1864)

Synonyms
- Gortyna cerussata Grote, 1864

= Papaipema cerussata =

Species of moth

Papaipema cerussata, the ironweed borer moth, is a moth in the family Noctuidae. It is found in eastern North America, where it has been recorded from Georgia, Illinois, Indiana, Kentucky, Maine, Maryland, Michigan, New Jersey, New York, North Carolina, Ohio, Pennsylvania, South Carolina, Tennessee, Virginia and West Virginia.

== Host plants ==
The larvae feed on Vernonia noveboracensis.
