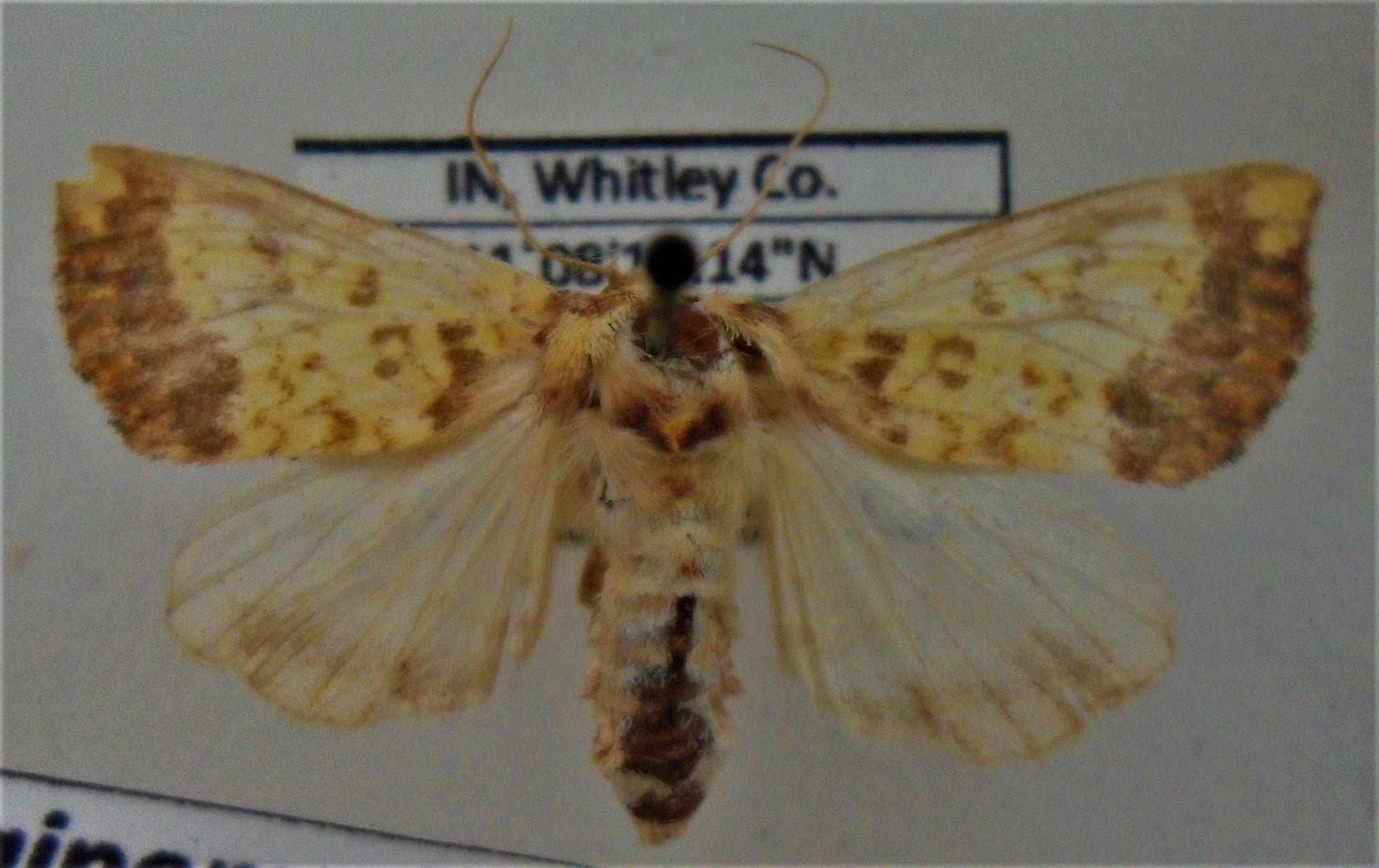

Scientific classification
- Domain: Eukaryota
- Kingdom: Animalia
- Phylum: Arthropoda
- Class: Insecta
- Order: Lepidoptera
- Superfamily: Noctuoidea
- Family: Noctuidae
- Genus: Papaipema
- Species: P. cerina

Binomial name
- Papaipema cerina (Grote, 1874)

Synonyms
- Gortyna cerina Grote, 1874

= Papaipema cerina =

Species of moth

Papaipema cerina, the golden borer moth, is a bright yellow moth of the family Noctuidae. Adults are on the wing from September through mid-October and can be found in patches throughout the Great Lakes region of North America. It has been recorded from Indiana, Michigan, Illinois, Maine, Ohio, Wisconsin, Iowa and Ontario. Their habitats include wetlands such as emergent marsh, southern wet meadow, wet prairie, wet-mesic sand prairie, prairie fen, southern hardwood swamp, mesic southern forest and dry-mesic southern forest.

== Hosts ==
Larvae feed on lilies and May apple. Also bottlebrush grass (Hystrix patula) and dark green bullrush (Scirpus atrovirens). The larva bores into the shoot or roots of its host. The larvae start in grass and then generally switch to Lilium and related plants and Podophyllum.

== Status ==
Uncommon to rare.
