= Penicillium mallochii =

Scientific classification
- Kingdom: Fungi
- Division: Ascomycota
- Class: Eurotiomycetes
- Order: Eurotiales
- Family: Aspergillaceae
- Genus: Penicillium
- Species: P. mallochii

Binomial name
- Penicillium mallochii Rivera, Urb & Seifert 2012

Type strain
- DAOM 239917

Species of fungus

Penicillium mallochii is a species of the genus of Penicillium, which was isolated from caterpillars of Rothschildia lebeau and Citheronia lobesis in Costa Rica.
