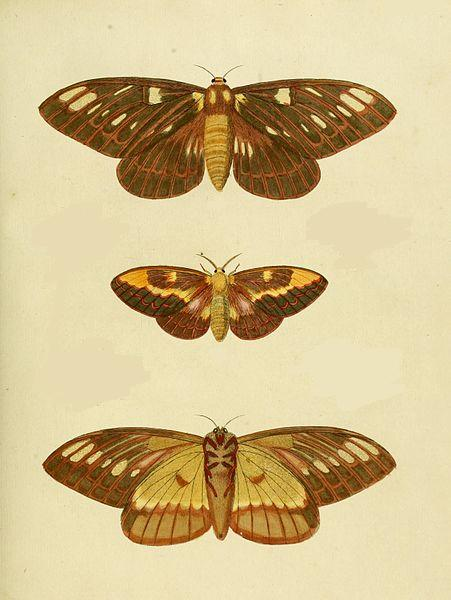

Scientific classification
- Kingdom: Animalia
- Phylum: Arthropoda
- Class: Insecta
- Order: Lepidoptera
- Family: Saturniidae
- Genus: Citheronia
- Species: C. laocoon

Binomial name
- Citheronia laocoon (Cramer, 1777)

Synonyms
- Phaleana Attacus laocoon Cramer, 1777; Citheronia anassa Hübner, 1820; Eacles cacicus Walker, 1855; Ceratocampa ixion Boisduval, 1868; Citheronia princeps Walker, 1855

= Citheronia laocoon =

Species of moth

Citheronia laocoon is a species of moth in the family Saturniidae. It is found from the Guianas south to northern Argentina.

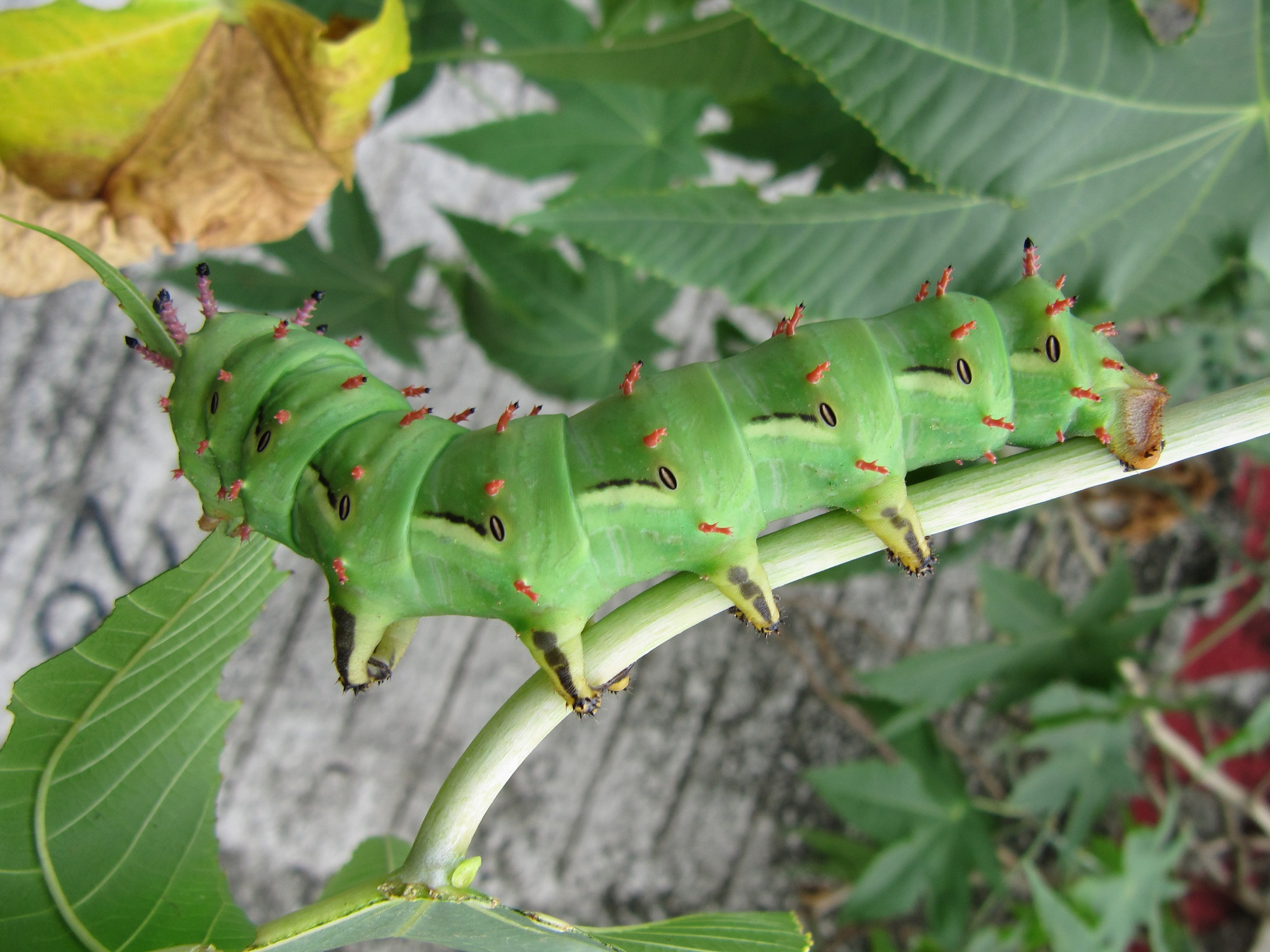
Larva

== Appearance ==
The moths are relatively large, with a 130-mm wingspan. They do not have a prominent discal spot, neither on fore or hindwing. Females are yellowish black, with orange-red venation. Males look similar, however they are smaller at 110-115-mm wingspan on average. The venation is more vivid and pronounced, however. Their hindwings are highly variable, ranging from yellow with a brown band to mostly red with yellow patches and brown stripes. Their abdomen are yellow, with a red dorsal side and sometimes have red flecks on the side.

Caterpillars are quite large, as with many others in the Citheronia genus, and are prominently green, with long prolegs that sport black 'racing stripes' and red 'horns' along each segment of their body. They also have an alternating pattern of a black stripe on each segment, that terminates at the spiracle (arthropods). Their dorsal side is darker green than their ventral side.

== Sexual dimorphism ==
This species is not heavily dimorphic. The main difference between the two sexes in the antennae and size. As with all Saturniidae, the antennae on the male tend to be much thicker to pick up pheromones, while females have thin antennae. Females are also much larger than males, and sport more yellow overall, compared to the males, which have more brown and yellow.

== Lifecycle ==
These moths hold a similar lifestyle to many other moths in the Ceratocampinae family, which have caterpillars who bury themselves pre-pupation. They start out as clusters of small, 3-5 millimeter eggs laid by a female onto a host plant, which will be talked about later. They hatch into small caterpillars, which are black and orange, and sport large 'horns'. They quickly eat and eat, going through 4 more instars before pupation. In the second instar, their body turns orange with a black head. In the third, they start showing green, and lose a majority of their black coloration. In the fourth, they turn primarily green with a black dorsal surface. In the fifth, they are mainly green. After their final molt as a caterpillar, they drop to the ground, dig underneath suitable soil, and pupate in a loose silken cocoon. They emerge when the dry season gives way to rainy, as they live in tropical climates. The males emerge mid-morning, while the females emerge in the evening. They pair up around dusk to very early morning, and lay eggs.

== Host plants ==
The larvae feed primarily on Prunus (including Prunus laurocerasus) and Ligustrum ovalifolium. However, in the wild they can be found on a wide range of other plants, supporting the idea they are highly polyphagous. These include members of the family Rosaceae, Ricinus communis, Prunus padus, and even Liquidambar. More testing will need to be done within more northern species of trees, such as Quercus and Acer.
