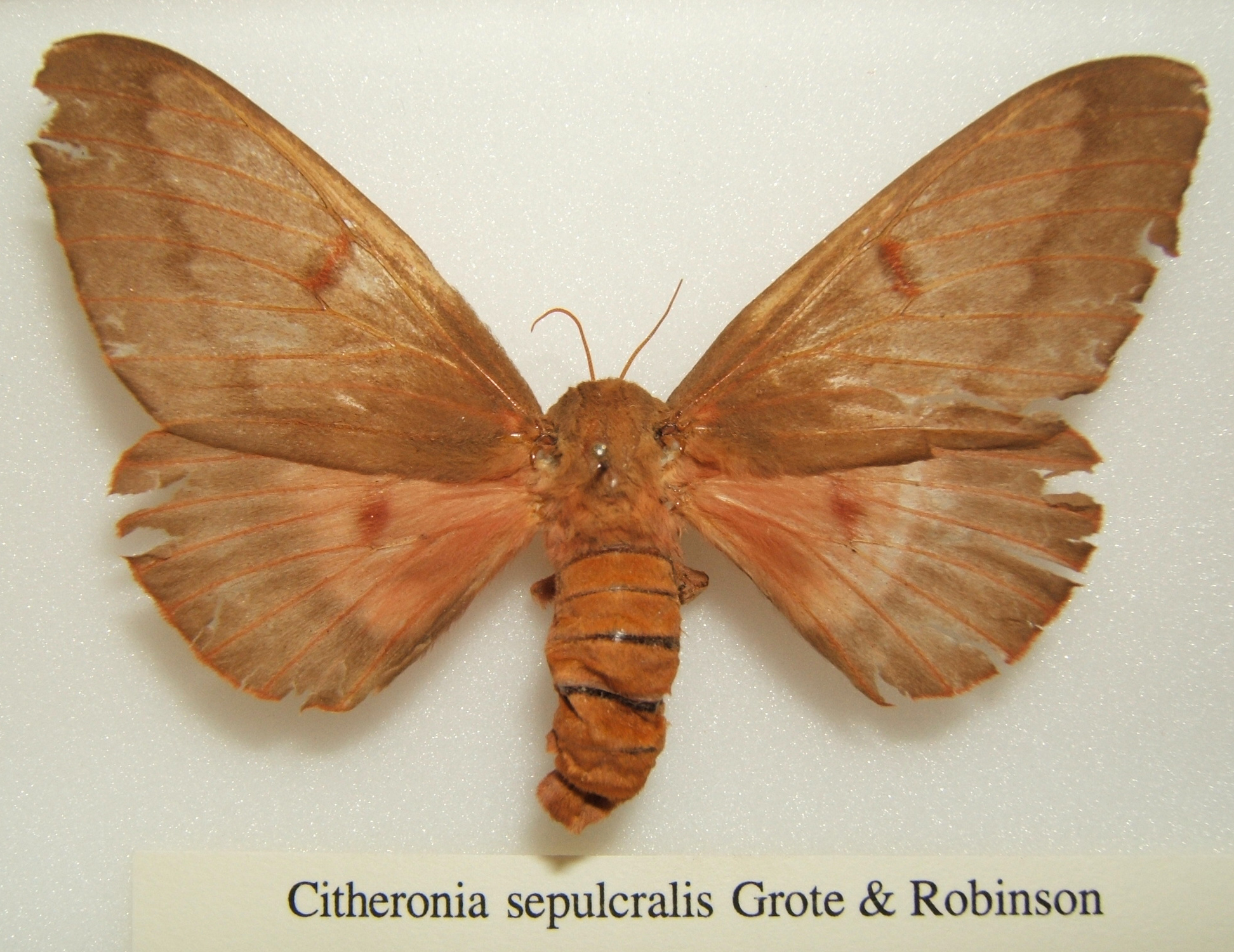
- Female

Scientific classification
- Kingdom: Animalia
- Phylum: Arthropoda
- Clade: Pancrustacea
- Class: Insecta
- Order: Lepidoptera
- Family: Saturniidae
- Genus: Citheronia
- Species: C. sepulcralis

Binomial name
- Citheronia sepulcralis (Grote & Robinson, 1865)

= Citheronia sepulcralis =

Pine-devil moth

Species of moth

Citheronia sepulcralis, the pine-devil moth, is a Nearctic member of the family Saturniidae and of the subfamily Ceratocampinae. The species are blackish brown. The species was first described by Augustus Radcliffe Grote and Coleman Townsend Robinson in 1865.

== Range ==
The adults fly in broods and can be found in various parts of the United States over the year. The moths are present in the states of Georgia, Kentucky, Massachusetts, North Carolina, South Carolina, Pennsylvania, Louisiana, Florida and Maine. They are most common in Florida and Louisiana.

Broods in the northern US will fly during June and July. In the southern states, the moths will fly from April through June. Several broods in Florida City, Florida can fly from March through October.

== Life cycle ==
=== Egg ===
The eggs hatch after 7 to 10 days, and the caterpillars start feeding almost immediately.

=== Larva ===
The larvae of the species are black or brown with black markings.

=== Pupa ===
As with most of this subfamily, when the caterpillars are ready to pupate, they burrow underground. The pupa is smooth and elongated, and adults typically emerge in late morning.

=== Adult ===
As with all of Saturniidae, the adults do not feed. Their mouthparts have been reduced. The adults are brown.

== Food plants ==
- Pinus (pine)

== Ecology ==
Adults emerge in the morning and mate on the same night. Females lay egg in groups of 1 to 3 on pine needles the next night.
