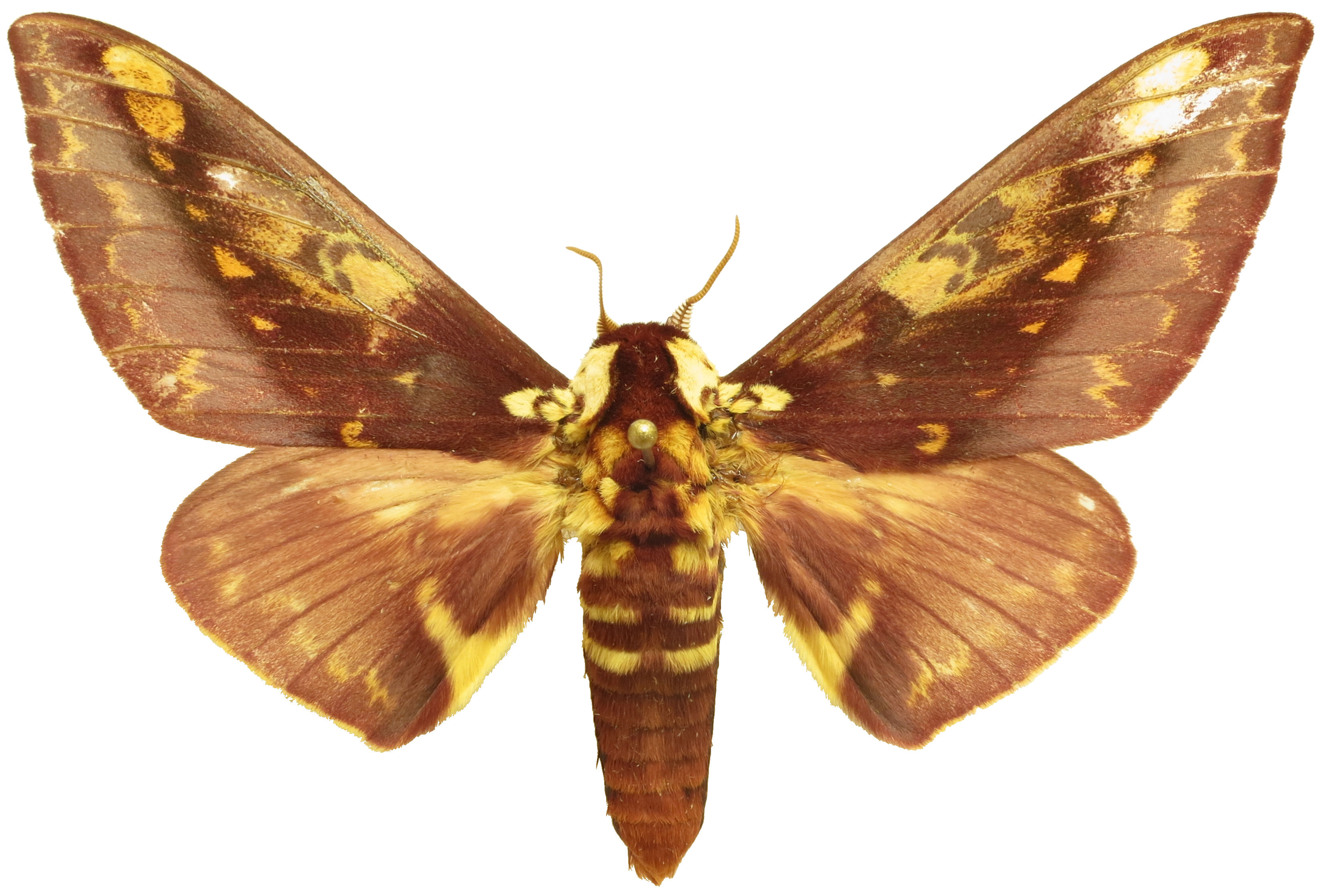
- Citheronia phoronea male

Scientific classification
- Kingdom: Animalia
- Phylum: Arthropoda
- Class: Insecta
- Order: Lepidoptera
- Family: Saturniidae
- Genus: Citheronia
- Species: C. phoronea

Binomial name
- Citheronia phoronea (Cramer, 1779)

Synonyms
- Phalaena phoronea Cramer, 1779

= Citheronia phoronea =

Species of moth

Citheronia phoronea is a moth of the family Saturniidae. It was described from Suriname.
