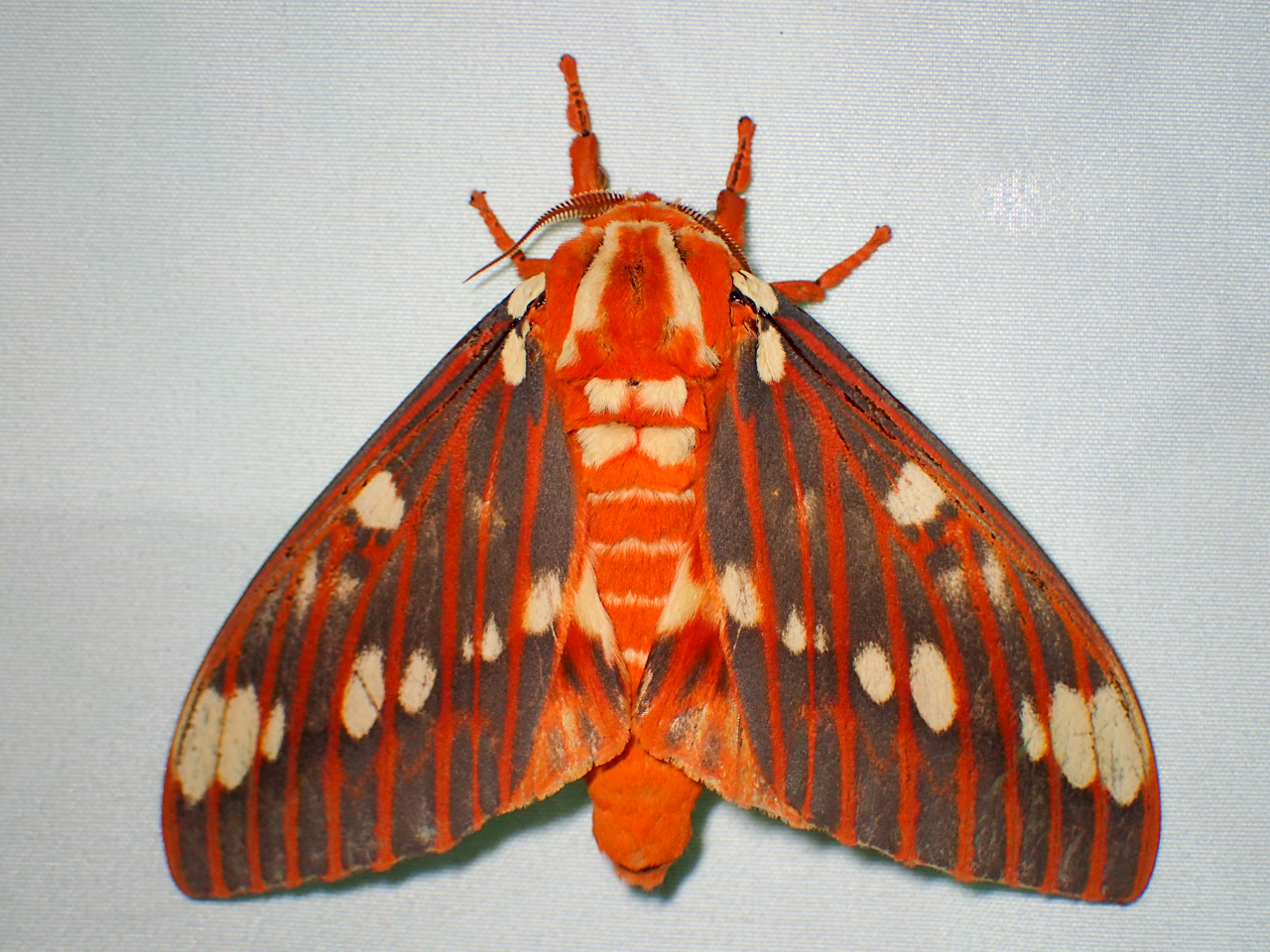
- Adult moth
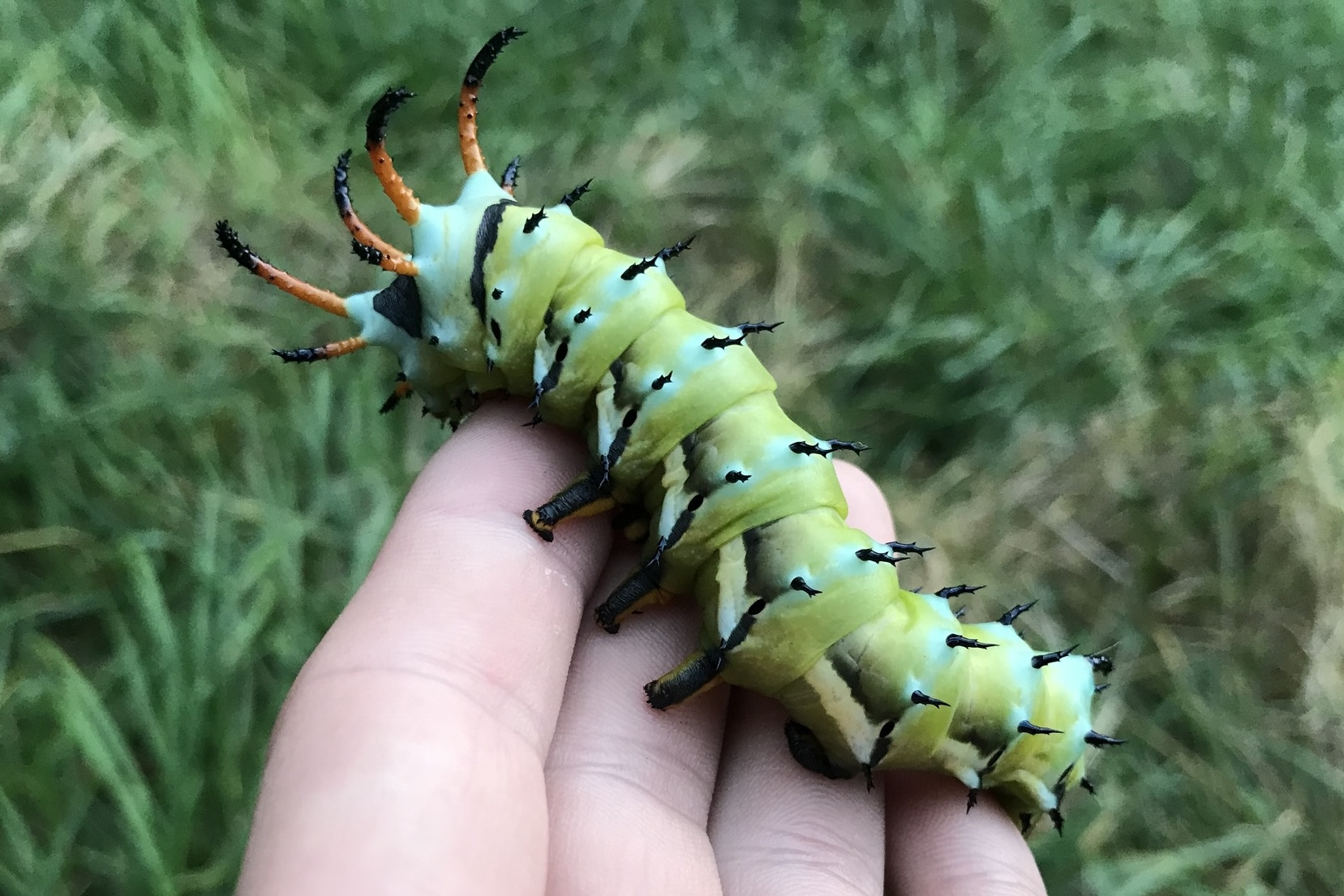
- "Hickory horned devil" caterpillar

Scientific classification
- Kingdom: Animalia
- Phylum: Arthropoda
- Clade: Pancrustacea
- Class: Insecta
- Order: Lepidoptera
- Family: Saturniidae
- Genus: Citheronia
- Species: C. regalis

Binomial name
- Citheronia regalis (Fabricius, 1793)

= Citheronia regalis =

Regal moth

Species of moth

Citheronia regalis, the regal moth or royal walnut moth, is a North American moth in the family Saturniidae. The caterpillars are called hickory horned devils. The adult (imago) has a wingspan of 3.75–6.1 in (9.5–15.5 cm). The species was first described by Johan Christian Fabricius in 1793.

== Life cycle ==
The adult moth is the largest moth by mass in latitudes north of Mexico, as are the spectacular larva and the substantial pupa.

The life cycle of the moth is typical of the Saturniidae species, and typical of the Ceratocampinae. It burrows into the ground to pupate in an earthen chamber, rather than spinning a cocoon.

Its eggs are yellowish, ovular and 2 mm in diameter. They are laid either singly or in groups of up to four on the upper surface of the host plant leaves, favoring nut trees such as Juglans and Carya (walnuts and hickories). There are regional preferences, with the utilization of sweet gum and persimmon in the south, and sumacs where the others are not available. Larvae are solitary in later stages and rarely occur in numbers large enough to cause defoliation; however, an individual larva can strip several branches of their leaves during the ravenous fifth instar.

The list of recorded hosts includes Carya (including Carya illinoinensis), Juglans cinerea, Liquidambar styraciflua, Diospyros virginiana, Rhus, Gossypium, and others. Adults do not feed.

After 7 to 10 days the eggs hatch into small larvae, yellow at first, then turning darker. The caterpillars are solitary nighttime feeders in early stages. They curl up in a "j" shaped pattern during the day and resemble two-toned bird droppings.

As the caterpillars age, they feed during the day. They molt four times. Each instar is different, but on their fifth and final instar they become a bright green color, with huge, black-tipped red horns, earning them their common name "hickory horned devils." They feed heavily on their host plant for 37 to 42 days and can grow up to 15 centimetres (5.9 in) long. Their frightening appearance is purely a ruse; the spines, though prickly, do not sting, and the larva is harmless and actually one of the more easily handled of the saturniidae.

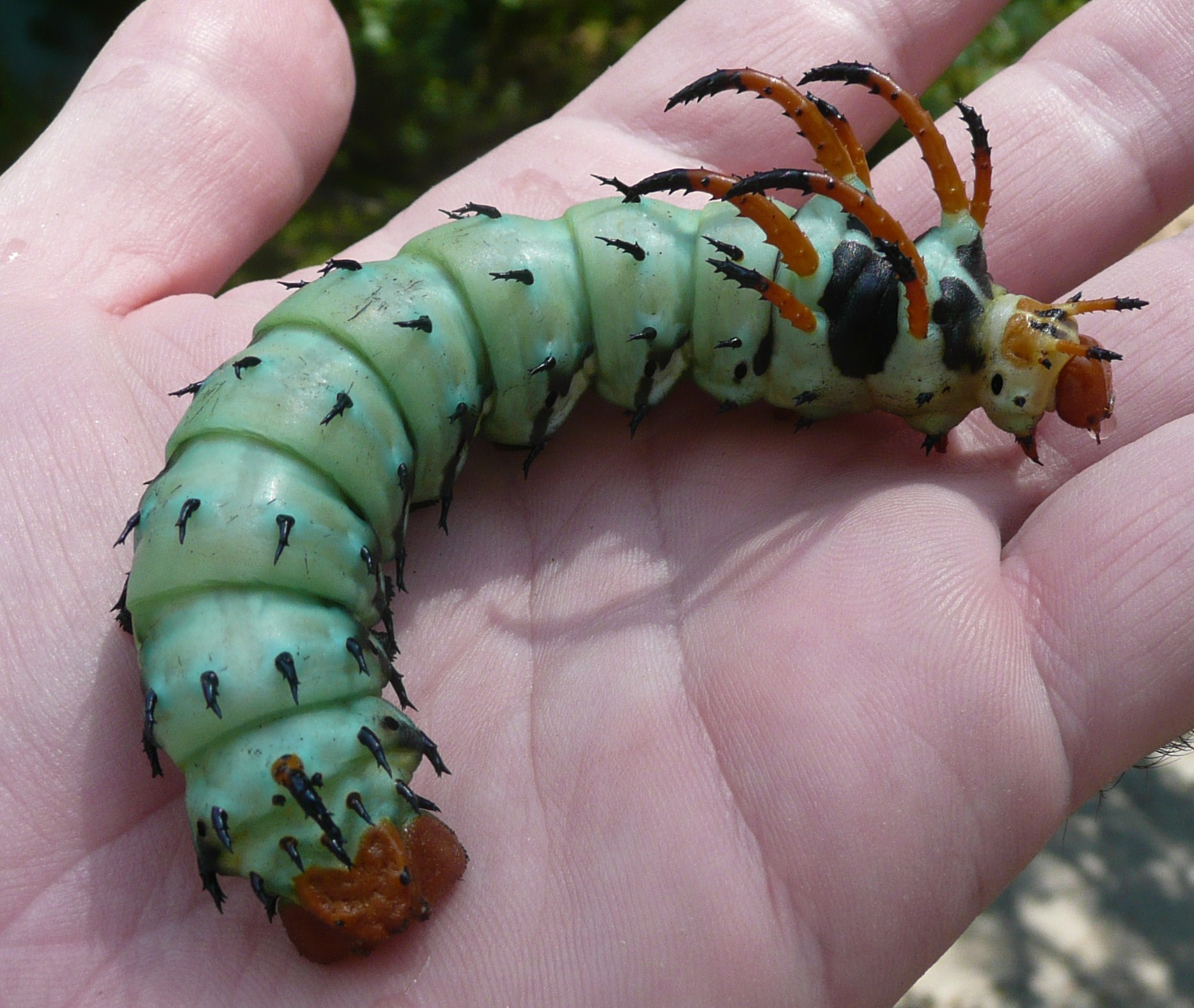
Hickory horned devil, larval stage of the regal moth showing the turquoise phase. Ozarks of Missouri.

Just before pupation, the larva expels its gut and changes color from green to turquoise, the skin of the fully fed creature stretched shiny and tight. They then crawl down the host plant to burrow into the dirt and pupate in a well formed chamber at a depth of five to six inches. The pupae are dark brown/black in color, and have a relatively short cremaster. Some pupae overwinter for two seasons, perhaps as an adaptation to variable and adverse conditions such as fires and flooding, or to maintain genetic diversity across generations.

When the moths eclose (emerge), they have to pump their wings with fluid (hemolymph) to extend them. The females emit pheromones, which the male can detect through its large, plumose antennae. Males can fly for miles in order to reach a female. After the moths mate, the female spends the majority of the remainder of her life laying eggs, while the male may mate several more times. Adults of this family of moths have vestigial mouths, meaning their mouthparts have been reduced. Because of this, they do not eat and only live for about a week as adults.

There is a single generation of Citheronia regalis throughout its range, but in the deep south, moths have been recorded throughout the longer growing season. Typically, C. regalis is a midsummer moth, on wing from late June through August with larvae peaking August through October. There is a distinct bell curve to the emergence, with peak weeks coinciding with the first spell of the humid summer weather, which may synchronize emergences.

== Range ==
Citheronia regalis is considered a common species in the American Deep South, becoming rarer and more sporadic northward. It is found throughout the deciduous forests in the United States from Missouri, Pennsylvania to Massachusetts and southward from Texas to central Florida. Historically recorded throughout New England, the species suffered a decline in the Atlantic Northeast during the mid-20th century.

Excluding sparse contemporary records from New York, Citheronia regalis achieves range stability in the mid Atlantic states and southern Appalachia, beginning from southern New Jersey west throughout the Ohio Valley, the edge of the Great Plains states and south to East Texas. It is listed as a species of special concern and believed extirpated in the US state of Connecticut.

Final instar before pupating

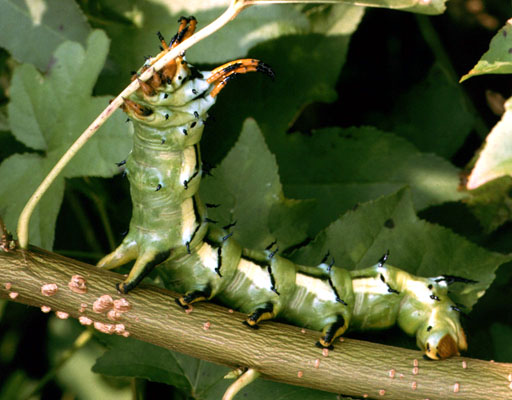
Larva

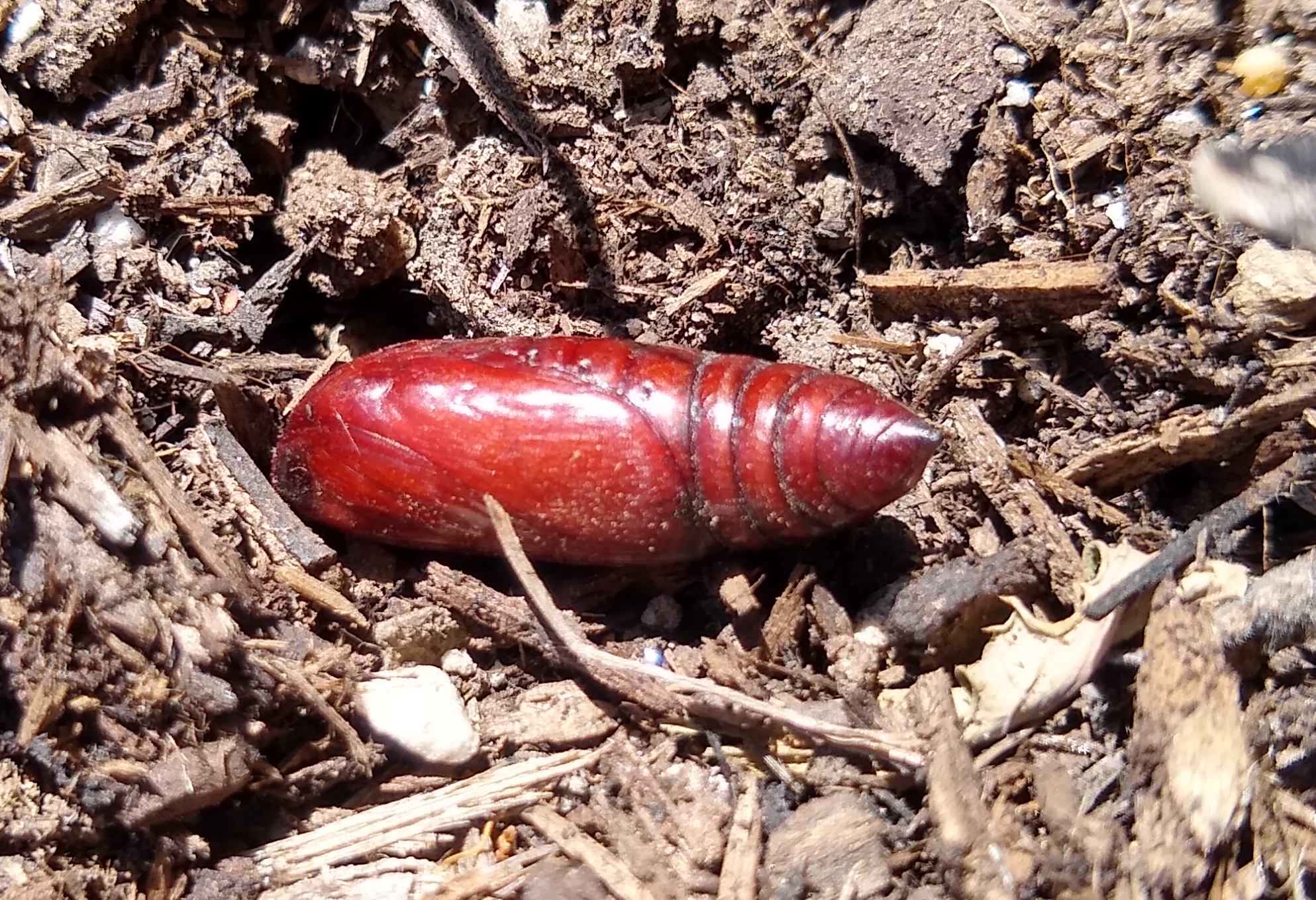
Pupa
