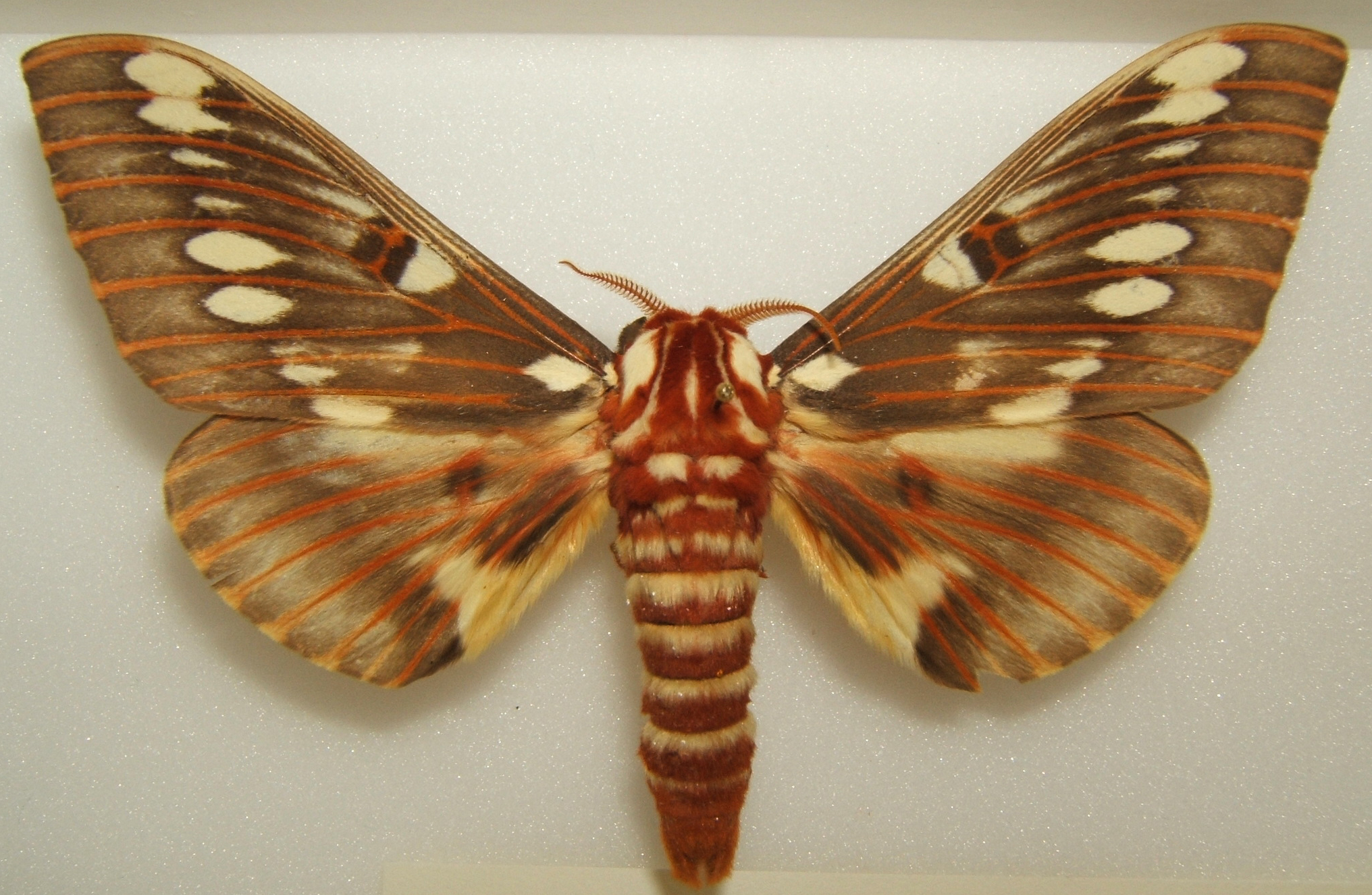
- Male

Scientific classification
- Domain: Eukaryota
- Kingdom: Animalia
- Phylum: Arthropoda
- Class: Insecta
- Order: Lepidoptera
- Family: Saturniidae
- Genus: Citheronia
- Species: C. splendens

Binomial name
- Citheronia splendens (H. Druce, 1886)

Synonyms
- Eacles splendens H. Druce, 1886

= Citheronia splendens =

Species of moth

Citheronia splendens, the splendid royal moth, is a moth of the family Saturniidae. It is found from southern Arizona south into central and south-eastern Mexico. The species was first described by Herbert Druce in 1886.

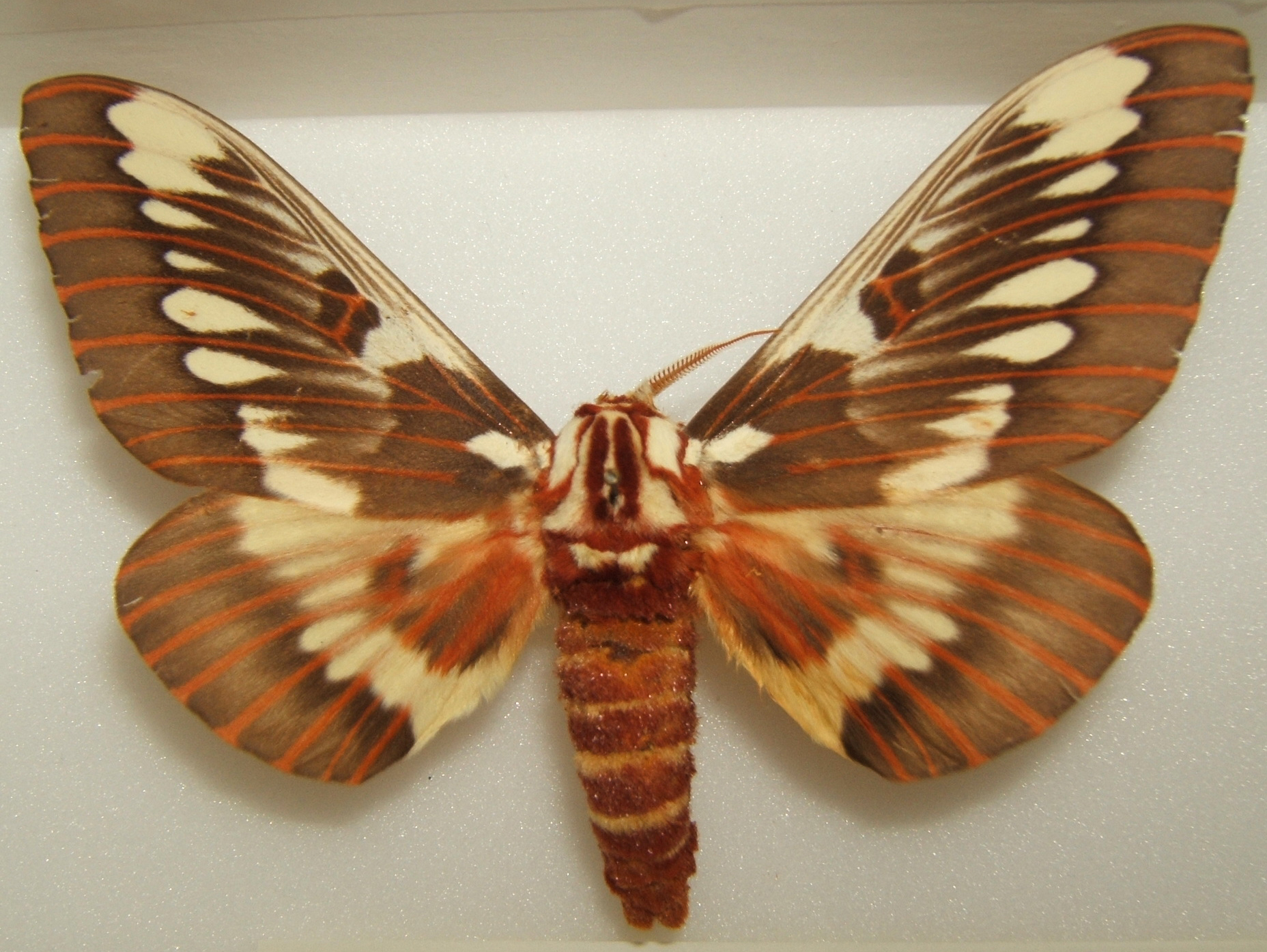
Citheronia splendens sinaloensis

The wingspan is 106–150 millimetres (4.2–5.9 inches). Adults are on wing from July to August.

== Life cycle ==
Females lay eggs in groups of 1 to 4 on sides of a plants leaves. The caterpillars look like bird droppings and spend majority of their life cycle on leaves, feeding on them in the evening. When the caterpillars mature they start feeding during the day as well by eating leaf petioles or stems. Their hosts are typically Gossypium thurberi, Rhus trilobata, Arctostaphylos pungens and Rhus choriophylla. In September, they burrow underground where they enter into their pupa stage. When pupa stage is done, the species turn into a moth.

== Subspecies ==
- Citheronia splendens splendens (Jalisco, México, Guerrero and Chiapas)
- Citheronia splendens sinaloensis Hoffmann, 1942 (central and northwestern Mexico, south-eastern Arizona)
- Citheronia splendens queretana Vázquez-G., 1944 (Mexico)
