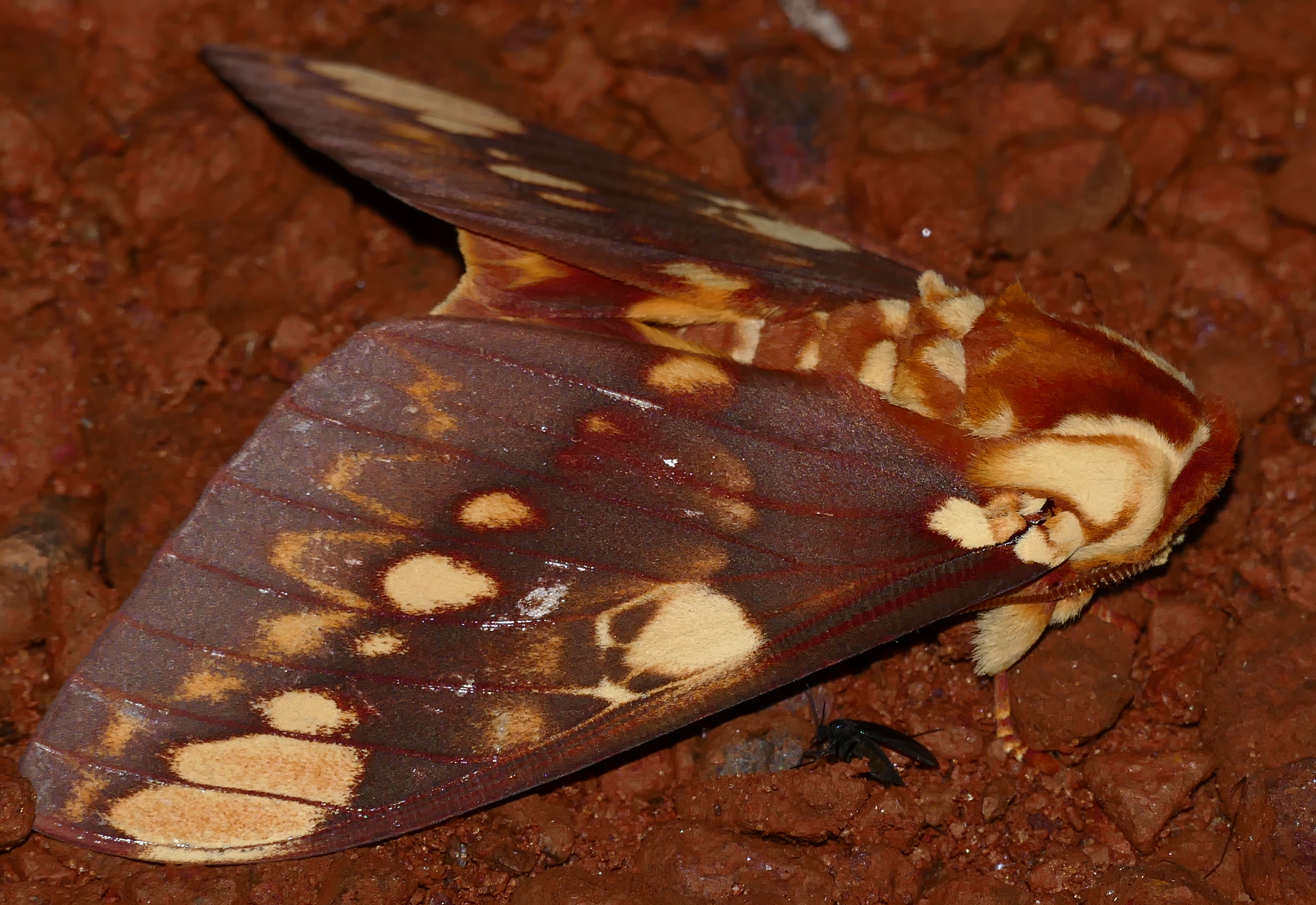

Scientific classification
- Domain: Eukaryota
- Kingdom: Animalia
- Phylum: Arthropoda
- Class: Insecta
- Order: Lepidoptera
- Family: Saturniidae
- Genus: Citheronia
- Species: C. hamifera

Binomial name
- Citheronia hamifera Rothschild, 1907

Synonyms
- Citheronia fuscalis Rothschild, 1907

= Citheronia hamifera =

Species of moth

Citheronia hamifera is a species of moth in the family Saturniidae first described by Walter Rothschild in 1907. It is found in Trinidad, Peru, Guyana, French Guiana, Argentina, Bolivia, Ecuador and Brazil.

Adults are reddish-black, with wingspans which may reach 15cm.

== Subspecies ==
- Citheronia hamifera hamifera (Trinidad, Guyana)
- Citheronia hamifera bodoquena Travassos & Rêgo-Barros, 1966
