= Citheronia vogleri =

Scientific classification
- Domain: Eukaryota
- Kingdom: Animalia
- Phylum: Arthropoda
- Class: Insecta
- Order: Lepidoptera
- Family: Saturniidae
- Genus: Citheronia
- Species: C. vogleri

Binomial name
- Citheronia vogleri (Weyenbergh, 1881)

Synonyms
- Ceratocampa vogleri Weyenbergh, 1881

Species of moth

Citheronia vogleri is a species of moth in the family Saturniidae. It was first described by Hendrik Weyenbergh Jr. in 1881. It is found in Paraguay, Argentina, Bolivia, Brazil and Uruguay.

Both sexes are black with yellow spots on the wings, but males also have orange spots and stripes.

The larvae feed on Pyrocantha species. They look like a piece of wood. They are gray.
