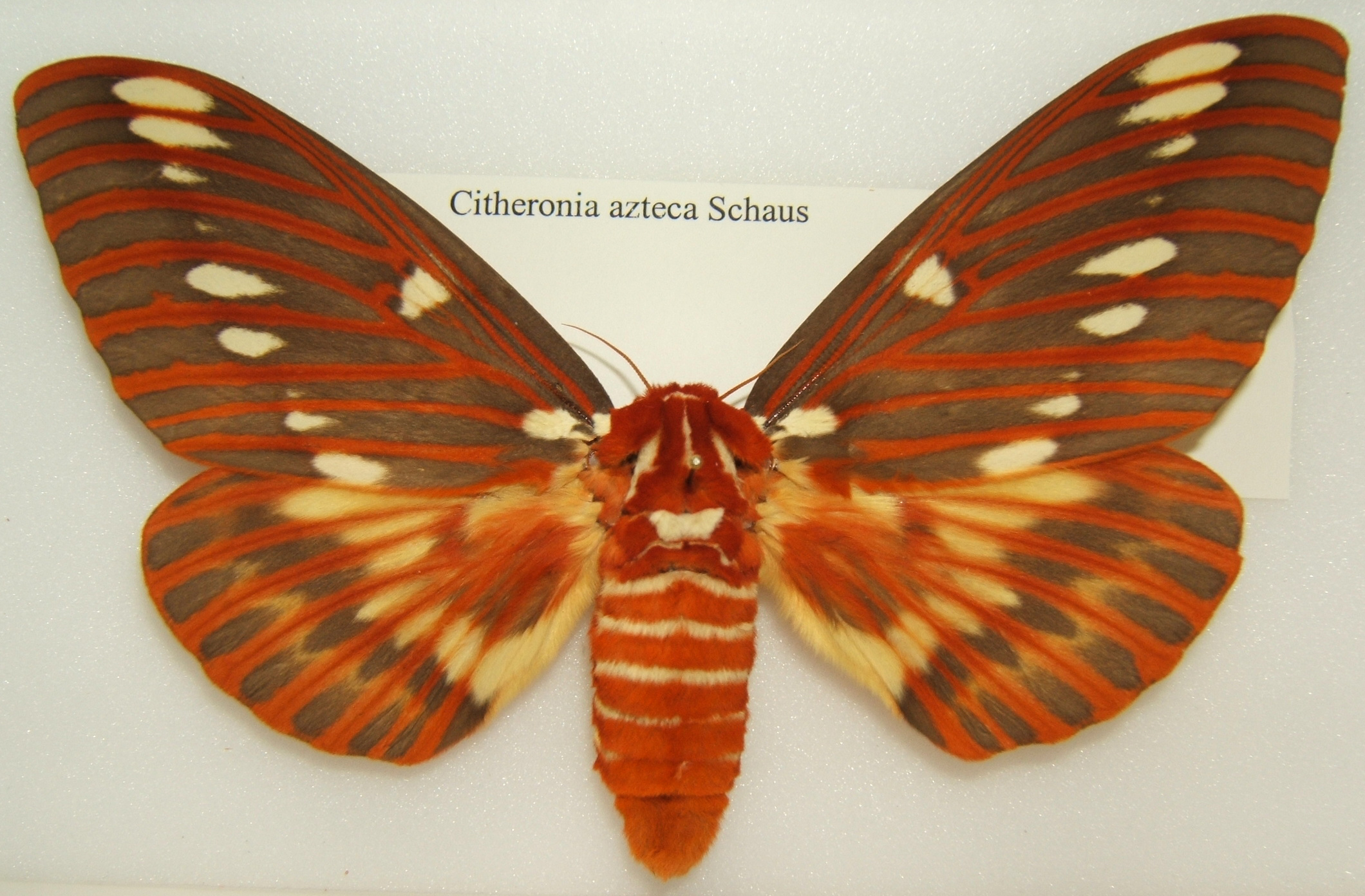
- Adult female

Scientific classification
- Kingdom: Animalia
- Phylum: Arthropoda
- Clade: Pancrustacea
- Class: Insecta
- Order: Lepidoptera
- Family: Saturniidae
- Genus: Citheronia
- Species: C. azteca

Binomial name
- Citheronia azteca Schaus, 1896

Synonyms
- Citheronia albescens Lemaire, 1973

= Citheronia azteca =

Species of moth

Citheronia azteca is a moth of the family Saturniidae that lives in Guatemala, Belize and Mexico.

== Description ==
=== Adult ===
The adult moth is relatively large, with a wingspan of 85–160 mm. Their forewings are a dusty gray color, with thick orange venation and small white splotches between veins. The hingwings are yellow near the body and gray away from the body, and sport the same thick orange venation. There is occasionally thin yellow banding as well. The body is orange with white highlights on the end of each abdominal segment and on the more reddish thorax.

=== Threat Pose ===
When threatened, the adult moth will pull its wings up like a butterfly, showing the bright underside of its wings. In addition, it will curl up its abdomen, showing the gaudy oranges and creams, while flapping its wings. This scares off some would-be predators.

=== Larvae ===
Larvae of this species are chocolate brown, and various instars have different protrusions and patterns.

==== L1 ====
The newly hatched caterpillars are 10–15 mm, and black. They have a visible orange saddle in the middle of their body, and sport large (for their size) horns on each segment of their body. These are for protection.

==== L2 ====
The caterpillars in this stage look quite similar to first instar caterpillars, but have more defined horns.

==== L3 ====
In this instar, the caterpillars lose their black coloration, and start to turn chocolate brown. They have faint pink stripes on their body, as well as conspicuous pink horns. Their prolegs are darker brown.

==== L4 ====
In the fourth instar, the caterpillars horns grow smaller, and their skin color darkens to a burnt chocolate brown to nearly black. However, they are still adorned with 'racing stripes' down their sides that are usually pale cream to pink colored.

==== L5 ====
In the fifth instar, the caterpillars grow to absolutely gargantuan sizes, able to reach nearly 150 mm in size. They accelerate the pace at which they eat even more, and prepare to pupate.

===== Prepupal Larvae =====
Caterpillars about to pupate in the wild dig underground and carve out a small cell, then enter a prepupal stage. In this state, their bodies deflate and lose a great deal of turgor, as well as becoming more short and elliptical. They darken and lose the ability to walk. Then they molt for the final time, and turn into pupa.

=== Pupae ===
Pupae are long and dark chocolate brown, with six visible segments on the abdomen. The wingbuds form a 'shield' over the front of the thorax where the legs are. They also have small dents at the wingtips. The overall shape gives off the effect of a cocktail wiener.

== Hostplants ==
These larvae are rather polyphagous, and have a wide variety of hostplants. Common hostplants include Liquidambar, Schinus, Prunus, Rhus, and Juglans. Further testing is required to know the caterpillars preferences towards more temperate trees such as Quercus and Pinus.

== Habitat ==
These moths live in Central and South America. The winters are relatively mild, but still quite cold and dry. They prefer medium forest coverage in the wild.

== Lifecycle ==
The flight pattern of this moth is univoltine, meaning that there is one generation per year, that produces one batch of moths that flies from June to July in the wild. If conditions are ideal, two generations can be forced in captivity. The pupa typically spend most of the year underground, waiting out the cold harsh winters. Caterpillars only eat for a couple of months before pupation, which is a very short time for such a large moth.
