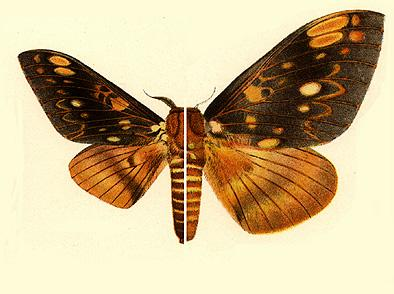
- Male (left), female (right)

Scientific classification
- Kingdom: Animalia
- Phylum: Arthropoda
- Clade: Pancrustacea
- Class: Insecta
- Order: Lepidoptera
- Family: Saturniidae
- Genus: Citheronia
- Species: C. mexicana

Binomial name
- Citheronia mexicana Grote & Robinson, 1866

= Citheronia mexicana =

Species of moth

Citheronia mexicana is a species of moth in the family Saturniidae. It can be found in Belize, Mexico and Guatemala.
