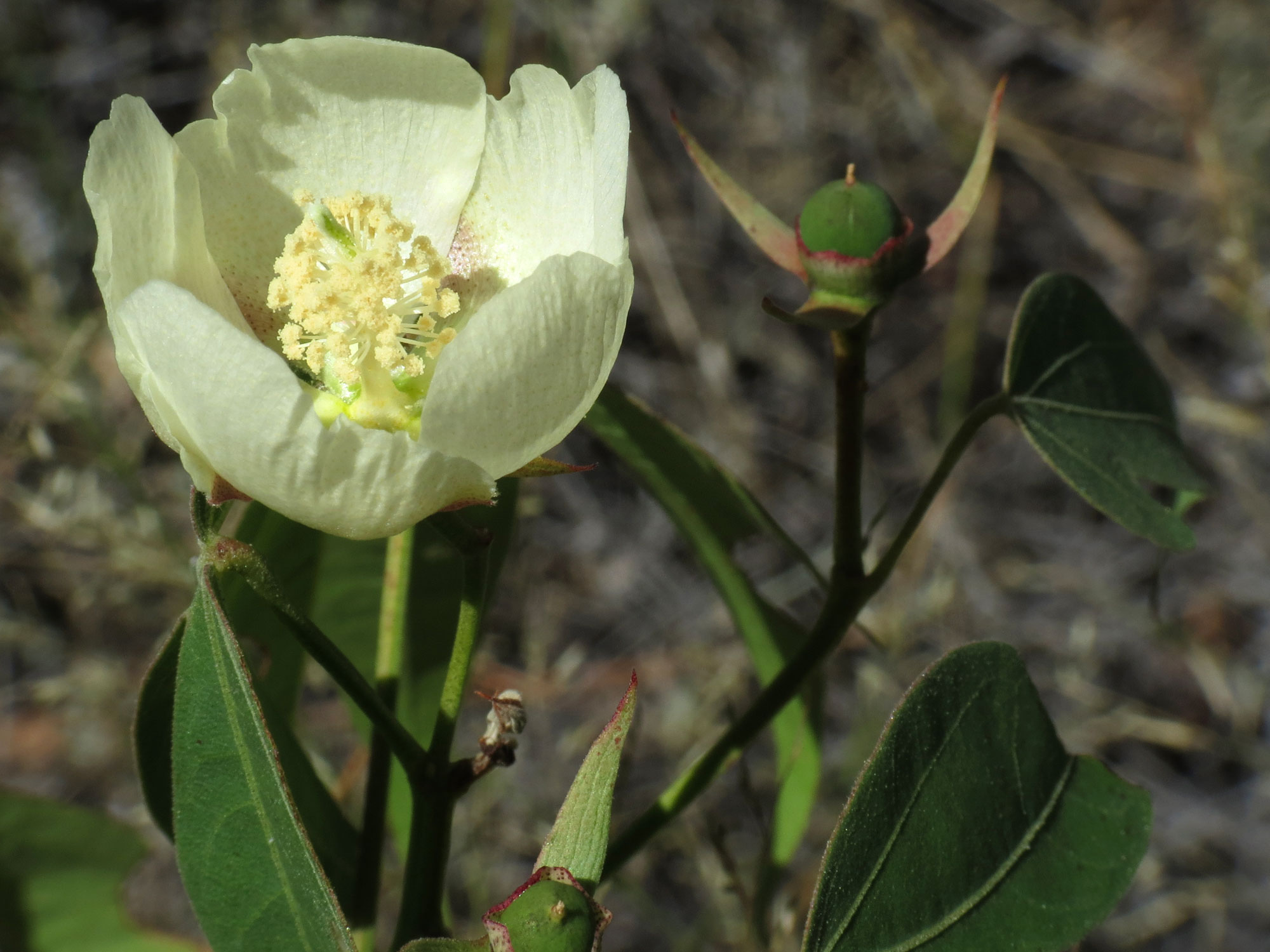

Scientific classification
- Kingdom: Plantae
- Clade: Embryophytes
- Clade: Tracheophytes
- Clade: Angiosperms
- Clade: Eudicots
- Clade: Rosids
- Order: Malvales
- Family: Malvaceae
- Genus: Gossypium
- Species: G. thurberi

Binomial name
- Gossypium thurberi Tod.

Synonyms
- Thurberia thespesioides A.Gray

= Gossypium thurberi =

Desert cotton

Species of flowering plant in the mallow family

Gossypium thurberi, also known as Arizona wild cotton, Thurber's cotton, or desert cotton, is a wild species of cotton.

== Description ==
Their flowers are not showy, but the palm-shaped green leaves turn maroon in autumn.

== Distribution ==
It is native to the Sonoran Desert area of northern Mexico and parts of the US state of Arizona. It is often used in southern Arizona landscapes as a deciduous shrub to small tree up to 10 feet (3.0 m) tall. It is a larval food plant for the royal moth (Citheronia splendens sinaloensis).
