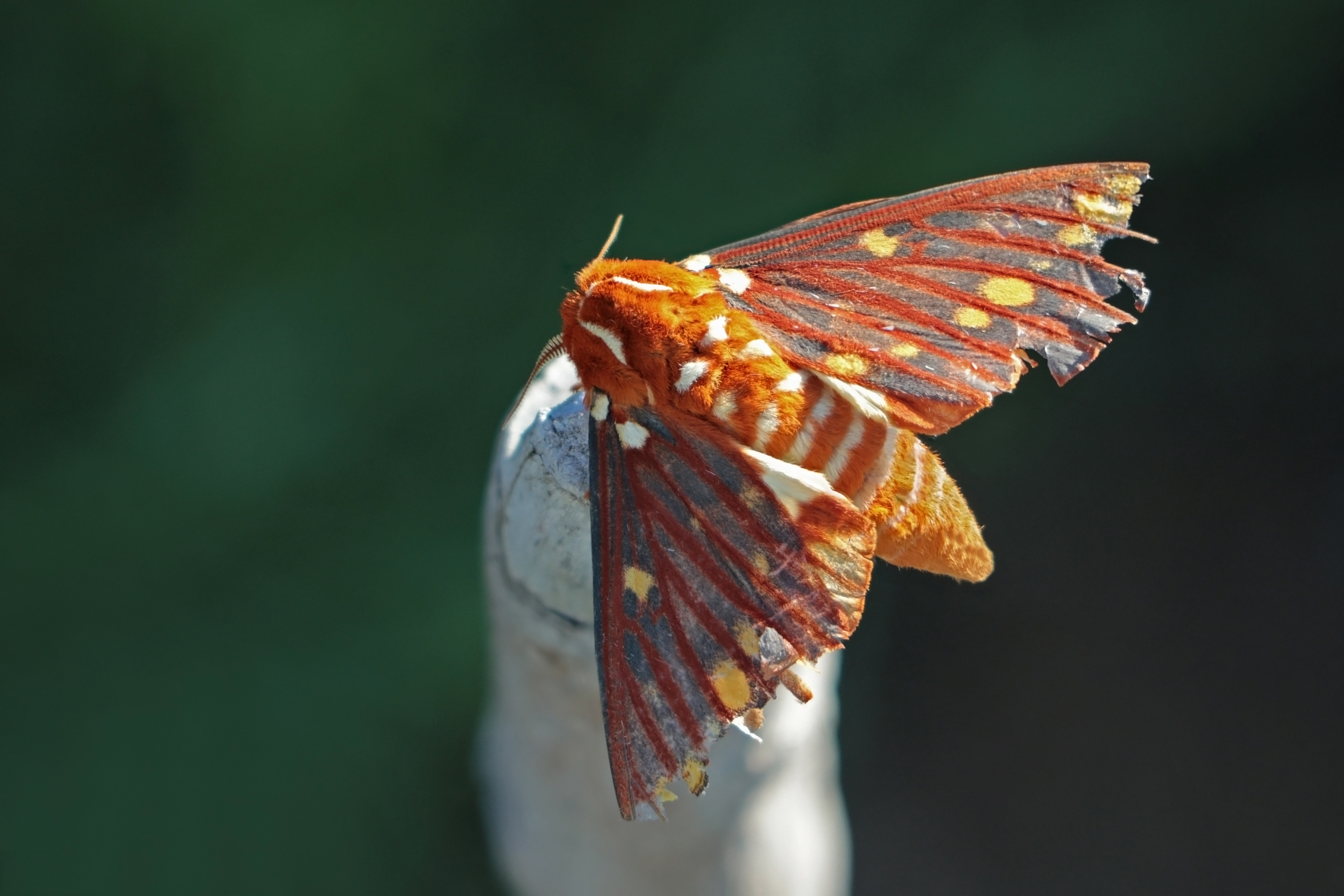
- Citheronia volcan Mount Totumas cloud forest, Panama

Scientific classification
- Kingdom: Animalia
- Phylum: Arthropoda
- Clade: Pancrustacea
- Class: Insecta
- Order: Lepidoptera
- Family: Saturniidae
- Subfamily: Ceratocampinae
- Genus: Citheronia; Hübner, 1819

Synonyms
- Eruca Edwards, 1771; Ceratocampa Harris, 1833; Dorycampha Duncan [& Westwood], 1841; Cithaeronia Agassiz, [1847]

= Citheronia =

Genus of moths

Citheronia is a genus of moths in the family Saturniidae. The genus was erected by Jacob Hübner in 1819.

== Species ==
- Citheronia andina Lemaire, 1971—Ecuador
- Citheronia aroa Schuas, 1896—Ecuador
- Citheronia azteca Schaus, 1896—Mexico and Guatemala
- Citheronia beledonon Dyar, 1912—Mexico
- Citheronia bellavista Draudt, 1930—Ecuador
- Citheronia brissotii (Boisduval, 1868)
- Citheronia equatorialis Bouvier, 1927—Ecuador
- Citheronia hamifera Rothschild, 1907—Ecuador
- Citheronia johnsoni Schaus, 1928
- Citheronia laocoon (Cramer, 1777)
- Citheronia lichyi Lemaire, 1971
- Citheronia lobesis Rothschild, 1907—Mexico
- Citheronia maureillei Wolfe & Herbin, 2002
- Citheronia mexicana Grote & Robinson, 1867—Mexico
- Citheronia phoronea (Cramer, 1779)
- Citheronia pseudomexicana Lemaire, 1974—Mexico
- Citheronia regalis (Fabricius, 1793)—United States
- Citheronia sepulcralis Grote & Robinson, 1865—U.S.
- Citheronia splendens (Druce, 1886)—U.S., Mexico
- Citheronia vogleri (Weyenbergh, 1881)— Paraguay, Argentina, Bolivia, Brazil and Uruguay.
- Citheronia volcan Lemaire, 1982
