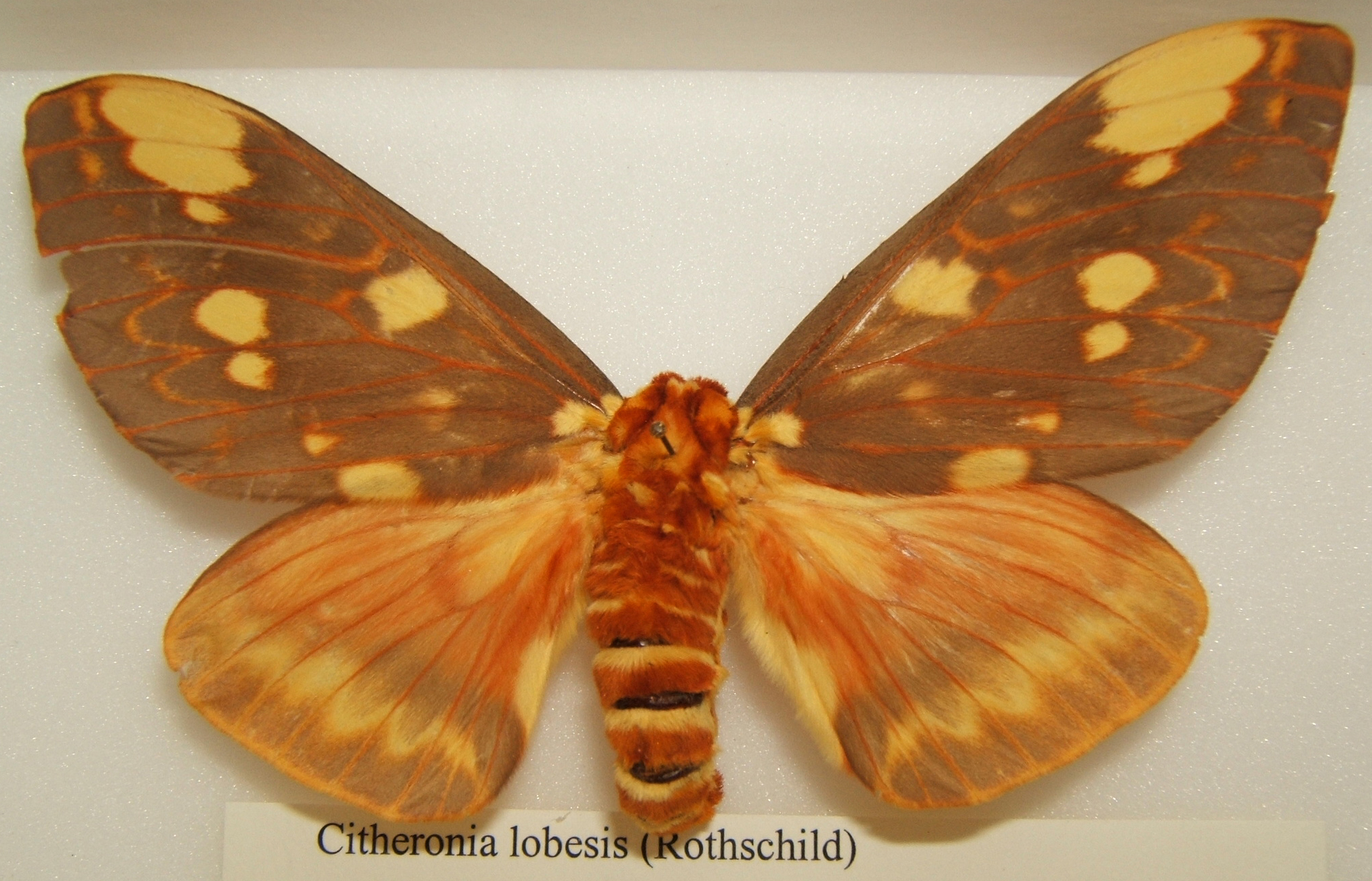
- Adult specimen

Scientific classification
- Domain: Eukaryota
- Kingdom: Animalia
- Phylum: Arthropoda
- Class: Insecta
- Order: Lepidoptera
- Family: Saturniidae
- Genus: Citheronia
- Species: C. lobesis

Binomial name
- Citheronia lobesis (Rothschild, 1907)

= Citheronia lobesis =

Species of moth

Citheronia lobesis is a moth of the family Saturniidae first described by Walter Rothschild in 1907. This moth has light orange bottom wings and darker orange upper wings with spots on them. Also, the body is orange and has black stripes.
