= List of Serica species =

This is a list of all species of May beetles and junebugs within the genus Serica, which is in the family Scarabaeidae.

== Subgenus Serica ==
- Serica abdita Dawson, 1921
- Serica acicula Dawson, 1932
- Serica acontia Dawson, 1933
- Serica adspersa Frey, 1972
- Serica adungana Ahrens, 1999
- Serica adversa Dawson, 1967
- Serica aemula Dawson, 1947
- Serica alabama Dawson, 1967
- Serica albisetis Ahrens, 2005
- Serica alleni Saylor, 1939
- Serica almorae Ahrens, 1999
- Serica alternata LeConte, 1856
- Serica ammomenisco Hardy, 1987
- Serica angustatotibialis Ahrens, 1999
- Serica anomala Arrow, 1946
- Serica anthracina LeConte, 1856
- Serica apatela Dawson, 1922
- Serica arborea Ahrens, 1999
- Serica arkansana Dawson, 1947
- Serica aspera Dawson, 1922
- Serica asperula Fairmaire, 1898
- Serica assequens Ahrens & Fabrizi, 2009
- Serica assingi Ahrens, Zhao, Pham & Liu, 2024
- Serica atracapilla (Kirby, 1837)
- Serica atratula LeConte, 1856
- Serica aviceps Dawson, 1967
- Serica baiyungshanica Ahrens, 2005
- Serica barri Dawson, 1967
- Serica basantapurensis Sreedevi, Speer, Fabrizi & Ahrens, 2018
- Serica basumtsoensis Ahrens, 2005
- Serica becvari Ahrens, 2005
- Serica behluddinensis Ahrens, 2005
- Serica benesi Ahrens, 2005
- Serica bhaktai Ahrens, 1999
- Serica bicornis Ahrens, 2005
- Serica bidentata Ahrens, 1999
- Serica bidigitata Ahrens, 2000
- Serica blatchleyi Dawson, 1932
- Serica bolm Ahrens, 2005
- Serica bomi Ahrens, Zhao, Pham & Liu, 2024
- Serica boops Waterhouse, 1875
- Serica brevitarsis Nomura, 1972
- Serica bruneri Dawson, 1967
- Serica brunnea (Linnaeus, 1758)
- Serica caliginosa Dawson, 1932
- Serica campestris Dawson, 1919
- Serica carbonaria Fairmaire, 1898
- Serica carolina Dawson, 1920
- Serica catalina Dawson, 1947
- Serica chaetosoma Dawson, 1932
- Serica chasilakhae Ahrens, 1999
- Serica chautarana Ahrens, 2005
- Serica chicoensis Saylor, 1939
- Serica chingkinyui Kobayashi, 1993
- Serica chinhillensis Ahrens & Fabrizi, 2011
- Serica christophreuteri Ahrens, Zhao, Pham & Liu, 2024
- Serica chuttana Ahrens, 1999
- Serica clypealis Fairmaire, 1899
- Serica coalinga Dawson, 1952
- Serica concinna Dawson, 1947
- Serica contorta Dawson, 1947
- Serica craighead Saylor, 1939
- Serica cribripennis Fairmaire, 1898
- Serica cruzi Saylor, 1939
- Serica cuona Ahrens, Zhao, Pham & Liu, 2024
- Serica curtipennis Fairmaire, 1901
- Serica curvata LeConte, 1856
- Serica cuyamaca Saylor, 1939
- Serica cyclonotus (Thomson, 1858)
- Serica daliangshanica Ahrens, 2005
- Serica daliensis Ahrens, 2005
- Serica dathei Ahrens, 2005
- Serica davidkrali Ahrens & Fabrizi, 2011
- Serica degenensis Ahrens, 2005
- Serica deserticola Dawson, 1952
- Serica deuvei Ahrens, 2005
- Serica diablo Dawson, 1967
- Serica doiinthanonensis Ahrens, 2005
- Serica dolens Ahrens, 2005
- Serica duplex Sharp, 1876
- Serica eberlei Sreedevi, Ranasinghe, Fabrizi & Ahrens, 2019
- Serica eberti (Frey, 1965)
- Serica echigoana (Nakane & Baba, 1960)
- Serica egregia Dawson, 1921
- Serica elmontea Saylor, 1939
- Serica elongatula Horn, 1870
- Serica elusa Dawson, 1919
- Serica emeishanica Ahrens, 2005
- Serica ensenada Saylor, 1948
- Serica evidens Blatchley, 1919
- Serica excisa (Frey, 1972)
- Serica exhausta Ahrens & Fabrizi, 2011
- Serica falcata Dawson, 1933
- Serica falcifera Ahrens & Fabrizi, 2009
- Serica falli Dawson, 1932
- Serica fansipan Ahrens, Zhao, Pham & Liu, 2024
- Serica fashengi Liu & Ahrens, 2014
- Serica feisintsiensis Ahrens, 2007
- Serica feresegregata Ahrens & Fabrizi, 2016
- Serica filitarsata Ahrens, 1999
- Serica fimbriata LeConte, 1856
- Serica floridana Dawson, 1967
- Serica foobowana Sawada, 1937
- Serica formosana Moser, 1915
- Serica frolovi Ahrens, 2021
- Serica frosti Dawson, 1967
- Serica fulvopubens (Reitter, 1896)
- Serica furcata Ahrens, 2005
- Serica fusa Brenske, 1898
- Serica fusciceps Fairmaire, 1897
- Serica fusifemorata Nomura, 1974
- Serica georgiana Leng, 1911
- Serica gonggashanica Ahrens, 2005
- Serica gongtonggouensis Ahrens, Zhao, Pham & Liu, 2024
- Serica gracilicornis Arrow, 1946
- Serica gracilipes Moser, 1915
- Serica grahami Ahrens, 2005
- Serica granulosa (Blanchard, 1850)
- Serica guangxiensis Ahrens, Zhao, Pham & Liu, 2024
- Serica guidoi Ahrens, 1999
- Serica gwangjuensis Ahrens, Zhao, Pham & Liu, 2024
- Serica hamifera (Walker, 1859)
- Serica heishuiensis Ahrens, 2005
- Serica heteracantha Dawson, 1967
- Serica heydeni (Reitter, 1896)
- Serica hirsuta Kim & Kim, 2003
- Serica hirtella Ahrens, 2005
- Serica hongyii Ahrens, Zhao, Pham & Liu, 2024
- Serica horrida Ahrens, 2007
- Serica howdeni Dawson, 1967
- Serica humboldti Gordon, 1975
- Serica imitans Chapin, 1931
- Serica inaequalis Ahrens, 2007
- Serica incognita Ahrens, 1999
- Serica incurvata (Nomura, 1971)
- Serica inexspectata (Kontkanen, 1956)
- Serica intermixta Blatchley, 1910
- Serica iricolor (Say, 1824)
- Serica jaegeri Ahrens, 1999
- Serica jiangda Ahrens, Zhao, Pham & Liu, 2024
- Serica jindrai Ahrens, 2007
- Serica jiulaoci Ahrens, Zhao, Pham & Liu, 2024
- Serica kalabi Ahrens, 2005
- Serica kangdingensis Ahrens, 2005
- Serica karafutoensis Niijima & Kinoshita, 1923
- Serica khajiaris Mittal, 1988
- Serica khasiana (Moser, 1918)
- Serica kingdoni Ahrens, 1999
- Serica kitulgalana Fabrizi & Ahrens, 2014
- Serica klapperichi (Frey, 1972)
- Serica kumaonensis Ahrens, 1999
- Serica lagoi Ahrens, 2007
- Serica laguna Saylor, 1935
- Serica lalashana Kobayashi, 1983
- Serica lama Ahrens, 1999
- Serica langeri Ahrens & Fabrizi, 2011
- Serica latesquamata Ahrens, 2007
- Serica leigongshanica Ahrens, 2005
- Serica lepidula Ahrens, 2005
- Serica ligulata Dawson, 1932
- Serica lijiangensis Ahrens, 2005
- Serica litangensis Ahrens, 2005
- Serica liyitengi Ahrens, Zhao, Pham & Liu, 2024
- Serica lodingi Dawson, 1952
- Serica longula Frey, 1972
- Serica loxia Dawson, 1920
- Serica lupina Arrow, 1945
- Serica lurida Brenske, 1898
- Serica lushui Ahrens, Zhao, Pham & Liu, 2024
- Serica maculosa Moser, 1915
- Serica mahakaliensis Sreedevi, Speer, Fabrizi & Ahrens, 2018
- Serica mckenziei Saylor, 1935
- Serica meiguensis Ahrens, 2005
- Serica mianningensis Ahrens, 2005
- Serica micans (Fabricius, 1801)
- Serica minshanica Ahrens, 2005
- Serica mixta LeConte, 1856
- Serica montreuili Ahrens, 2005
- Serica moupinensis (Fairmaire, 1889)
- Serica muliensis Ahrens, 2005
- Serica mureensis Ahrens, 1999
- Serica mystaca Dawson, 1922
- Serica nagana Brenske, 1899
- Serica nana Brenske, 1898
- Serica nanjiangana Ahrens, 2005
- Serica narya Ahrens, 1999
- Serica nebulosa Ahrens, 1999
- Serica nepalensis (Frey, 1969)
- Serica nigricans Brenske, 1894
- Serica nigroguttata Brenske, 1897
- Serica nigroguttulata Von Dalle Torre, 1912
- Serica nigromaculosa Fairmaire, 1891
- Serica nigrovariata Lewis, 1895
- Serica nipponica (Nomura, 1959)
- Serica nitididorsis (Nomura, 1971)
- Serica ochrosoma Dawson, 1919
- Serica olivacea Brenske, 1896
- Serica oliver Saylor, 1939
- Serica opaciclypealis Ahrens, 1999
- Serica opacithorax Nomura, 1974
- Serica opposita Dawson, 1921
- Serica ovata (Nomura, 1974)
- Serica palaea Ahrens, 2004
- Serica pallipes Fairmaire, 1900
- Serica panchaseana Ahrens, 2004
- Serica panda Dawson, 1952
- Serica panwarensis Ahrens & Fabrizi, 2011
- Serica parallela Casey, 1884
- Serica parasquamosa Ahrens, 2007
- Serica parvula (Blanchard, 1850)
- Serica pavonia Dawson, 1932
- Serica peleca Dawson, 1952
- Serica pelelaensis Ahrens & Fabrizi, 2011
- Serica perigonia Dawson, 1920
- Serica pigrans Ahrens & Fabrizi, 2009
- Serica pilifera Horn, 1894
- Serica pilumna Ahrens & Fabrizi, 2009
- Serica planifrons (Nomura, 1972)
- Serica plutenkoi Ahrens, 2005
- Serica polita (Gebler, 1832)
- Serica pommeranzi Ahrens, 1999
- Serica porcula Casey, 1884
- Serica prava Dawson, 1933
- Serica proclivis Ahrens, 1999
- Serica prunipennis Saylor, 1936
- Serica psammobuna Hardy, 1987
- Serica puetzi Ahrens, 2005
- Serica pullata Dawson, 1967
- Serica pulvinosa Frey, 1972
- Serica pusilla Dawson, 1922
- Serica qinlingshanica Ahrens, 2005
- Serica qizhihaoi Ahrens, Zhao, Pham & Liu, 2024
- Serica ramosa Ahrens, 1999
- Serica ratcliffei Ahrens, 2005
- Serica rectidens Ahrens & Fabrizi, 2009
- Serica regia Brenske, 1894
- Serica repanda Dawson, 1933
- Serica rhypha Dawson, 1952
- Serica ribbei Ahrens, 1999
- Serica rosinae Pic, 1904
- Serica rossi Saylor, 1948
- Serica rubricollis (Blanchard, 1850)
- Serica rufoguttata Fairmaire, 1901
- Serica sandiegensis Saylor, 1939
- Serica satrapa Dawson, 1947
- Serica scaphia Dawson, 1952
- Serica schoenmanni Ahrens, 2005
- Serica sculptilis Dawson, 1922
- Serica scutellaris Arrow, 1946
- Serica segregata Arrow, 1946
- Serica semicincta (Walker, 1859)
- Serica semicribrosa Fairmaire, 1886
- Serica senta Dawson, 1933
- Serica septemfoliata (Frey, 1972)
- Serica septentrionalis Murayama, 1935
- Serica serensia Saylor, 1948
- Serica sericea (Illiger, 1802)
- Serica sericeoides Dawson, 1967
- Serica serotina LeConte, 1856
- Serica setiensis Rana, Fabrizi & Ahrens, 2017
- Serica shaanxiensis Ahrens, 2005
- Serica sherpa (Sabatinelli & Migliaccio, 1982)
- Serica shokhini Ahrens, 2005
- Serica silviae Ahrens, 2009
- Serica sinuaticeps Moser, 1915
- Serica solita Dawson, 1922
- Serica solivaga Brenske, 1898
- Serica sparsa Arrow, 1946
- Serica sphaerica Burmeister, 1855
- Serica spicula Dawson, 1921
- Serica sponsa Dawson, 1919
- Serica squamosa Ahrens, 2007
- Serica sticta Ahrens & Fabrizi, 2009
- Serica stygia Dawson, 1933
- Serica subglobosa Nonfried, 1892
- Serica subnisa Dawson, 1947
- Serica subpilosa Ahrens, 2007
- Serica sudhausi Ahrens, 2005
- Serica taibashanica Ahrens, 2005
- Serica takagii Sawada, 1937
- Serica tantula Dawson, 1922
- Serica tashigaonensis Sreedevi, Ranasinghe, Fabrizi & Ahrens, 2019
- Serica tayanpingensis Ahrens, 2005
- Serica texana LeConte, 1856
- Serica therathumensis Sreedevi, Speer, Fabrizi & Ahrens, 2018
- Serica thibetana Brenske, 1897
- Serica tokejii (Nomura, 1959)
- Serica tomiensis Ahrens & Fabrizi, 2009
- Serica tongluana Ahrens, 1999
- Serica trapezicollis Ahrens, 2005
- Serica trichofemorata (Nomura, 1959)
- Serica tristis LeConte, 1850
- Serica trociformis Burmeister, 1844
- Serica tropdeana Ahrens, 1999
- Serica tryznai Ahrens, 2007
- Serica tukucheana Ahrens, 1999
- Serica umbrosa Fairmaire, 1868
- Serica unicolor Nonfried, 1894
- Serica variolosa Motschulsky, 1863
- Serica velutina Arrow, 1946
- Serica ventrituberculata Ahrens, Fabrizi & Liu, 2022
- Serica ventura Dawson, 1932
- Serica vespertina (Gyllenhal, 1817)
- Serica watson Saylor, 1939
- Serica weiperti Ahrens, 2004
- Serica werneri Ahrens, 2007
- Serica wrasei Ahrens, 2007
- Serica wrzecionkoi Ahrens & Fabrizi, 2009
- Serica xichangensis Ahrens, 2005
- Serica xizang Ahrens, Zhao, Pham & Liu, 2024
- Serica yaogiensis Ahrens, 2005
- Serica yoshidai (Nomura, 1959)
- Serica yulongshanica Ahrens, 2005
- Serica zerchei Ahrens, 2005
- Serica zhamu Ahrens, Zhao, Pham & Liu, 2024
- Serica zianii Sreedevi, Speer, Fabrizi & Ahrens, 2018

== Subgenus Taiwanoserica Nomura, 1974 ==
- Serica anmashana (Kobayashi, 1993)
- Serica bihluhensis (Kobayashi, 2000)
- Serica chengtuensis Ahrens, 2009
- Serica chunlinlii (Ahrens, 2002)
- Serica elongata (Nomura, 1974)
- Serica gracilipes (Nomura, 1974)
- Serica kubotai (Kobayashi, 1983)
- Serica liboyani Zhao & Ahrens, 2023
- Serica lishana (Nomura, 1974)
- Serica monticola (Kobayashi, 2000)
- Serica niitakana (Sawada, 1939)
- Serica nitidipes (Nomura, 1974)
- Serica pubisterna (Nomura, 1974)
- Serica shinanshana (Kobayashi, 1988)
- Serica sigipinensis Ahrens, 2009
- Serica simillima (Kobayashi, 1983)
- Serica sinuosa (Kobayashi, 2000)
- Serica suturalis (Nomura, 1974)
- Serica suzukii (Kobayashi, 1983)
- Serica taiyal (Kobayashi, 2000)
- Serica variegata (Nomura, 1974)
- Serica wenchuanensis Ahrens, 2009
- Serica yangzaichuni Zhao & Ahrens, 2023
- Serica yexiaohani Ahrens, Zhao, Pham & Liu, 2024
- Serica yui (Kobayashi, 1993)

== Unplaced ==
- Serica allolongipes Ahrens, Fabrizi & Liu, 2022
- Serica allonanhua Liu, Ahrens, Li & Su, 2023
- Serica allotengchongana Ahrens, Fabrizi & Liu, 2022
- Serica anhua Ahrens, Zhao, Pham & Liu, 2024
- Serica babaoshanensis Zhao & Ahrens, 2023
- Serica baishuitaiensis Ahrens, Fabrizi & Liu, 2022
- Serica baoshan Ahrens, Fabrizi & Liu, 2022
- Serica breviantennalis Liu, Ahrens, Li & Su, 2023
- Serica caiyiyiae Zhao & Ahrens, 2023
- Serica callosericoides Zhao & Ahrens, 2023
- Serica camura Ahrens, Zhao, Pham & Liu, 2024
- Serica daqiaoana Ahrens, Fabrizi & Liu, 2022
- Serica dissimillima Ahrens, Fabrizi & Liu, 2022
- Serica emaw Ahrens, Fabrizi & Liu, 2022
- Serica fengensis Liu, Ahrens, Li & Su, 2023
- Serica fengxue Ahrens, Zhao, Pham & Liu, 2024
- Serica gaoligong Ahrens, Fabrizi & Liu, 2022
- Serica guangnanensis Ahrens, Fabrizi & Liu, 2022
- Serica hailuogou Ahrens, Fabrizi & Liu, 2022
- Serica huangbaiyuanensis Ahrens, Fabrizi & Liu, 2022
- Serica huangjing Ahrens, Fabrizi & Liu, 2022
- Serica jani Ahrens, Fabrizi & Liu, 2022
- Serica jaroslavi Ahrens, Fabrizi & Liu, 2022
- Serica jiankouensis Ahrens, Fabrizi & Liu, 2022
- Serica jicaiyanae Zhao & Ahrens, 2023
- Serica jirii Ahrens, Fabrizi & Liu, 2022
- Serica kuankuoshuiensis Ahrens, Fabrizi & Liu, 2022
- Serica limbourgi Ahrens, Fabrizi & Liu, 2022
- Serica longidentata Zhao & Ahrens, 2023
- Serica longipes Ahrens, Fabrizi & Liu, 2022
- Serica longwang Ahrens, Fabrizi & Liu, 2022
- Serica mengsongana Ahrens, Fabrizi & Liu, 2022
- Serica nanhua Ahrens, Fabrizi & Liu, 2022
- Serica nhiae Ahrens, Zhao, Pham & Liu, 2024
- Serica pangwa Ahrens, Fabrizi & Liu, 2022
- Serica paracallosericoides Ahrens, Zhao, Pham & Liu, 2024
- Serica paralongipes Ahrens, Fabrizi & Liu, 2022
- Serica paralupina Ahrens, Fabrizi & Liu, 2022
- Serica pseudogracilipes Ahrens, Fabrizi & Liu, 2022
- Serica shengtangshan Ahrens, Fabrizi & Liu, 2022
- Serica shiduensis Ahrens, Fabrizi & Liu, 2022
- Serica smetanai Ahrens, Fabrizi & Liu, 2022
- Serica subansiriensis Gupta, Bhunia, Ahrens & Chandra, 2025
- Serica taishun Ahrens, Fabrizi & Liu, 2022
- Serica taythien Ahrens, Zhao, Pham & Liu, 2024
- Serica tengchongana Ahrens, Fabrizi & Liu, 2022
- Serica tianmushan Ahrens, Fabrizi & Liu, 2022
- Serica tianpingshanensis Ahrens, Fabrizi & Liu, 2022
- Serica wuyishan Ahrens, Zhao, Pham & Liu, 2024
- Serica yini Ahrens, Fabrizi & Liu, 2022
- Serica yuechengling Ahrens, Zhao, Pham & Liu, 2024
- Serica yuheba Ahrens, Fabrizi & Liu, 2022
- Serica zhangyaonani Zhao & Ahrens, 2023
- Serica zhenba Ahrens, Fabrizi & Liu, 2022
- Serica ziqingi Ahrens, Fabrizi & Liu, 2022

== Fossil species ==
- †Serica antediluviana Wickham, 1912
- †Serica cockerelli Wickham, 1914
- †Serica kanakoffi Pierce, 1946 (California)
- †Serica minutula Heer, 1862

== Selected former species ==
- Serica delicata Dawson, 1922
- Serica niijima (Kontkanen, 1956)
