= Serica adungana =

Scientific classification
- Kingdom: Animalia
- Phylum: Arthropoda
- Class: Insecta
- Order: Coleoptera
- Suborder: Polyphaga
- Infraorder: Scarabaeiformia
- Family: Scarabaeidae
- Genus: Serica
- Species: S. adungana

Binomial name
- Serica adungana Ahrens, 1999

Species of beetle

Serica adungana is a species of beetle of the family Scarabaeidae. It is found in Myanmar.

== Description ==
Adults reach a length of about 8.6–8.9 mm. They have a reddish-brown, elongate body. The legs and antennae are yellowish. The upper surface is glabrous and mostly dull.
