= Serica subpilosa =

Scientific classification
- Kingdom: Animalia
- Phylum: Arthropoda
- Class: Insecta
- Order: Coleoptera
- Suborder: Polyphaga
- Infraorder: Scarabaeiformia
- Family: Scarabaeidae
- Genus: Serica
- Species: S. subpilosa

Binomial name
- Serica subpilosa Ahrens, 2007

Species of beetle

Serica subpilosa is a species of beetle of the family Scarabaeidae. It is found in Vietnam.

== Description ==
Adults reach a length of about 7.7–8.4 mm. They have a dark brown, partially dark green or reddish-brown spotted, elongate-oval body. The antennae and legs are yellowish-brown. The surface is entirely dull, except for the shiny labroclypeus. The upper surface has dense, fine and weakly erect, almost evenly distributed yellow hairs. The elytra has individual, erect, long, white scale-like setae.

== Etymology ==
The species name is derived from Latin sub (meaning almost) and pilosus (meaning hairy).
