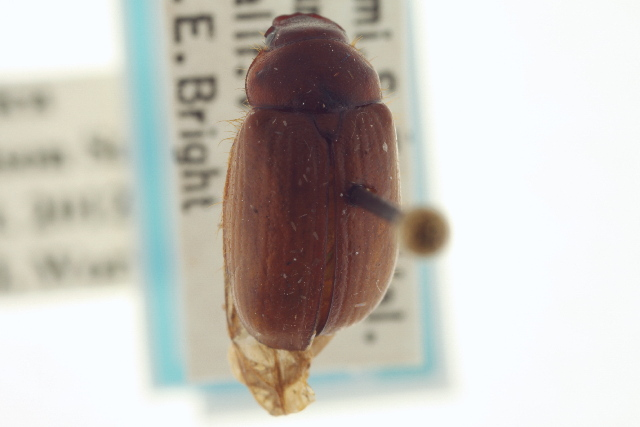

Scientific classification
- Kingdom: Animalia
- Phylum: Arthropoda
- Class: Insecta
- Order: Coleoptera
- Suborder: Polyphaga
- Infraorder: Scarabaeiformia
- Family: Scarabaeidae
- Genus: Serica
- Species: S. watson

Binomial name
- Serica watson Saylor, 1939

= Serica watson =

Species of beetle

Serica watson is a species of beetle of the family Scarabaeidae. It is found in the United States (California).

== Description ==
Adults reach a length of about 8 mm. They have a robust, somewhat shining body. The elytra are slightly pruinose and the elytra, sides of the thorax and clypeus, base of clypeus, and apex of thorax have sparse erect hairs.
