= Serica scaphia =

Scientific classification
- Kingdom: Animalia
- Phylum: Arthropoda
- Class: Insecta
- Order: Coleoptera
- Suborder: Polyphaga
- Infraorder: Scarabaeiformia
- Family: Scarabaeidae
- Genus: Serica
- Species: S. scaphia

Binomial name
- Serica scaphia Dawson, 1952

Species of beetle

Serica scaphia is a species of beetle of the family Scarabaeidae. It is found in the United States (California).

== Description ==
Adults reach a length of about 10 mm. The colour is light reddish brown and shining. The surface is practically devoid of the bloom and iridescent luster characteristic of most of the south-western species of the Serica genus.
