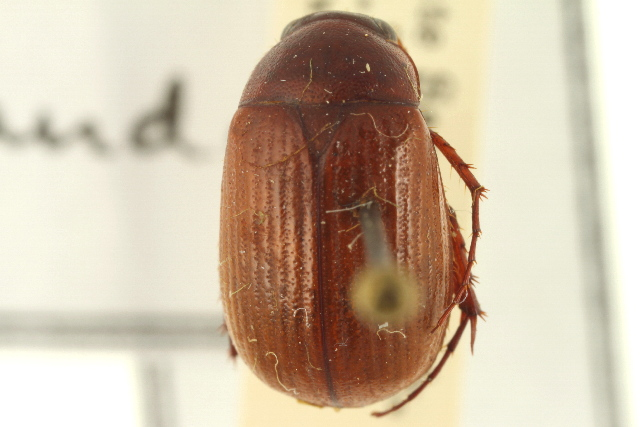

Scientific classification
- Kingdom: Animalia
- Phylum: Arthropoda
- Class: Insecta
- Order: Coleoptera
- Suborder: Polyphaga
- Infraorder: Scarabaeiformia
- Family: Scarabaeidae
- Genus: Serica
- Species: S. panda

Binomial name
- Serica panda Dawson, 1952

= Serica panda =

Species of beetle

Serica panda is a species of beetle of the family Scarabaeidae. It is found in the United States (Alabama, Indiana, Kentucky).

== Description ==
Adults reach a length of about 9 mm. The colour is light reddish brown. The surface is bare and shining.
