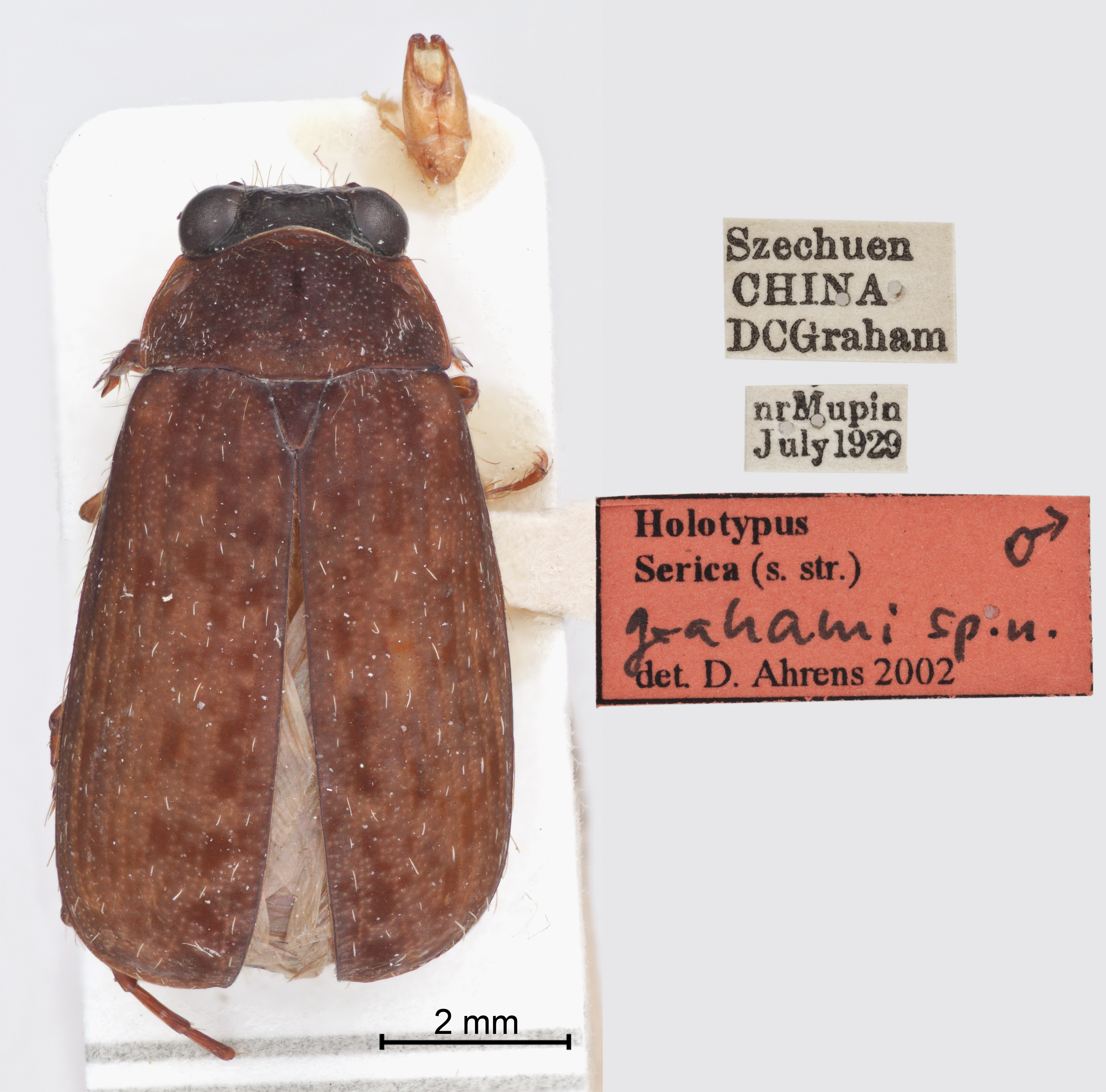

Scientific classification
- Kingdom: Animalia
- Phylum: Arthropoda
- Class: Insecta
- Order: Coleoptera
- Suborder: Polyphaga
- Infraorder: Scarabaeiformia
- Family: Scarabaeidae
- Genus: Serica
- Species: S. grahami

Binomial name
- Serica grahami Ahrens, 2005

= Serica grahami =

Species of beetle

Serica grahami is a species of beetle of the family Scarabaeidae. It is found in China (Sichuan).
