= Serica deserticola =

Scientific classification
- Kingdom: Animalia
- Phylum: Arthropoda
- Class: Insecta
- Order: Coleoptera
- Suborder: Polyphaga
- Infraorder: Scarabaeiformia
- Family: Scarabaeidae
- Genus: Serica
- Species: S. deserticola

Binomial name
- Serica deserticola Dawson, 1952

Species of beetle

Serica deserticola is a species of beetle of the family Scarabaeidae. It is found in the United States (California).

== Description ==
Adults reach a length of about 8 mm. The colour is reddish brown, dulled by a heavy grey or silvery bloom covering the vertex, pronotum and elytra.
