= Serica longwang =

Scientific classification
- Kingdom: Animalia
- Phylum: Arthropoda
- Class: Insecta
- Order: Coleoptera
- Suborder: Polyphaga
- Infraorder: Scarabaeiformia
- Family: Scarabaeidae
- Genus: Serica
- Species: S. longwang

Binomial name
- Serica longwang Ahrens, Fabrizi & Liu, 2022

Species of beetle

Serica longwang is a species of beetle of the family Scarabaeidae. It is found in China (Fujian, Zhejiang).

== Description ==
Adults reach a length of about 9–9.2 mm. They have an elongate body. The dorsal and ventral surface are yellowish brown, the former shiny and glabrous. The antennae are yellow.

== Etymology ==
The species name is derived from its type locality, Longwang.
