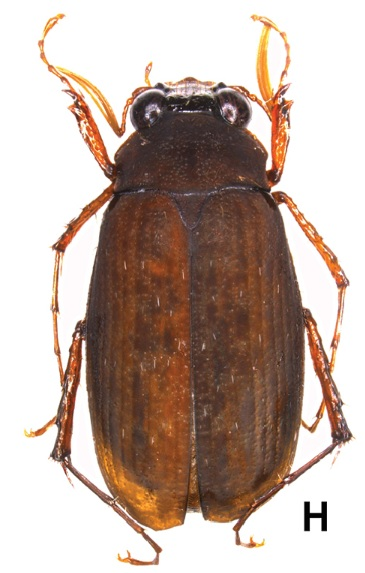

Scientific classification
- Kingdom: Animalia
- Phylum: Arthropoda
- Clade: Pancrustacea
- Class: Insecta
- Order: Coleoptera
- Suborder: Polyphaga
- Infraorder: Scarabaeiformia
- Family: Scarabaeidae
- Genus: Serica
- Species: S. zianii

Binomial name
- Serica zianii Sreedevi, Speer, Fabrizi & Ahrens, 2018

= Serica zianii =

Species of beetle

Serica zianii is a species of beetle of the family Scarabaeidae. It is found in Bhutan.

== Description ==
Adults reach a length of about 8 mm. They have a dark reddish brown, oblong body. The antennae are yellowish and the legs are reddish brown. The dorsal surface (except for the head) is dull and sparsely setose.

== Etymology ==
The species is named after its collector, Stefano Ziani.
