= Serica wrzecionkoi =

Scientific classification
- Kingdom: Animalia
- Phylum: Arthropoda
- Class: Insecta
- Order: Coleoptera
- Suborder: Polyphaga
- Infraorder: Scarabaeiformia
- Family: Scarabaeidae
- Genus: Serica
- Species: S. wrzecionkoi

Binomial name
- Serica wrzecionkoi Ahrens & Fabrizi, 2009

Species of beetle

Serica wrzecionkoi is a species of beetle of the family Scarabaeidae. It is found in China (Xizang).

== Description ==
Adults reach a length of about 7.7–8 mm. They have a reddish brown, oblong body. The antennae are yellowish. The dorsal surface is shiny and nearly glabrous.

== Etymology ==
The species is named after its collector, A. Wrzecionko.
