= Serica almorae =

Scientific classification
- Kingdom: Animalia
- Phylum: Arthropoda
- Class: Insecta
- Order: Coleoptera
- Suborder: Polyphaga
- Infraorder: Scarabaeiformia
- Family: Scarabaeidae
- Genus: Serica
- Species: S. almorae

Binomial name
- Serica almorae Ahrens, 1999

Species of beetle

Serica almorae is a species of beetle of the family Scarabaeidae. It is found in India (the Pindar valley in Uttarakhand).

== Description ==
Adults reach a length of about 8.2 mm. They have a chestnut brown, elongate-oval body. The antennae are yellowish. The upper surface is mostly dull and nearly glabrous.
