= Serica repanda =

Scientific classification
- Kingdom: Animalia
- Phylum: Arthropoda
- Class: Insecta
- Order: Coleoptera
- Suborder: Polyphaga
- Infraorder: Scarabaeiformia
- Family: Scarabaeidae
- Genus: Serica
- Species: S. repanda

Binomial name
- Serica repanda Dawson, 1933

Species of beetle

Serica repanda is a species of beetle of the family Scarabaeidae. It is found in the United States (California).

== Description ==
Adults reach a length of about 6.5–7 mm. The colour is brown (chestnut to bay). They are sub-opaque. The marginal fimbriate hairs are relatively sparse and inconspicuous.
