= Serica chasilakhae =

Scientific classification
- Kingdom: Animalia
- Phylum: Arthropoda
- Class: Insecta
- Order: Coleoptera
- Suborder: Polyphaga
- Infraorder: Scarabaeiformia
- Family: Scarabaeidae
- Genus: Serica
- Species: S. chasilakhae

Binomial name
- Serica chasilakhae Ahrens, 1999

Species of beetle

Serica chasilakhae is a species of beetle of the family Scarabaeidae. It is found in Bhutan.

== Description ==
Adults reach a length of about 8.5 mm. They have a light reddish-brown, elongate-oval body, with the head darker. There are numerous small, spots on the elytra. The upper surface is mostly dull, partly with a metallic green sheen, and with a few fine hairs.
