= Serica fusciceps =

Scientific classification
- Kingdom: Animalia
- Phylum: Arthropoda
- Class: Insecta
- Order: Coleoptera
- Suborder: Polyphaga
- Infraorder: Scarabaeiformia
- Family: Scarabaeidae
- Genus: Serica
- Species: S. fusciceps

Binomial name
- Serica fusciceps Fairmaire, 1897

Synonyms
- Serica fuscipes

Species of beetle

Serica fusciceps is a species of beetle of the family Scarabaeidae. It is found in Madagascar.

== Description ==
Adults reach a length of about 9–10 mm. They have an oblong, convex, dark, shiny body. The pronotum and elytra are red and the head is blackish and densely punctate. The antennae are also blackish.
