= Serica nagana =

Scientific classification
- Kingdom: Animalia
- Phylum: Arthropoda
- Class: Insecta
- Order: Coleoptera
- Suborder: Polyphaga
- Infraorder: Scarabaeiformia
- Family: Scarabaeidae
- Genus: Serica
- Species: S. nagana

Binomial name
- Serica nagana Brenske, 1899

Species of beetle

Serica nagana is a species of beetle of the family Scarabaeidae. It is found in India (Nagaland).
