= Serica yuheba =

Scientific classification
- Kingdom: Animalia
- Phylum: Arthropoda
- Class: Insecta
- Order: Coleoptera
- Suborder: Polyphaga
- Infraorder: Scarabaeiformia
- Family: Scarabaeidae
- Genus: Serica
- Species: S. yuheba

Binomial name
- Serica yuheba Ahrens, Fabrizi & Liu, 2022

Species of beetle

Serica yuheba is a species of beetle of the family Scarabaeidae. It is found in China (Guizhou).

== Description ==
Adults reach a length of about 8.2–8.3 mm. They have a dark brown, dull, elongate body, partly with a greenish shine. The elytra have several dark impunctate spots and a large round dark preapical spot, and the antennae are yellow. The dorsal surface is densely covered with short scale-like, white setae.

== Etymology ==
The species name refers to its type locality, Yuheba.
