= Serica jicaiyanae =

Scientific classification
- Kingdom: Animalia
- Phylum: Arthropoda
- Class: Insecta
- Order: Coleoptera
- Suborder: Polyphaga
- Infraorder: Scarabaeiformia
- Family: Scarabaeidae
- Genus: Serica
- Species: S. jicaiyanae

Binomial name
- Serica jicaiyanae Zhao & Ahrens, 2023

Species of beetle

Serica jicaiyanae is a species of beetle of the family Scarabaeidae. It is found in China (Xizang).

== Description ==
Adults reach a length of about 11.2–12.3 mm. They have a dull, brown, ovoid body, the pronotum, scutellum and base of the elytra with a greenish toment. The elytra are much paler and have an irregular, dark pattern. The antennae and legs are yellowish brown.

== Etymology ==
The species is dedicated to Ms. Cai-Yan Ji, the mother of Mr. Chuan-Tao Zhai.
