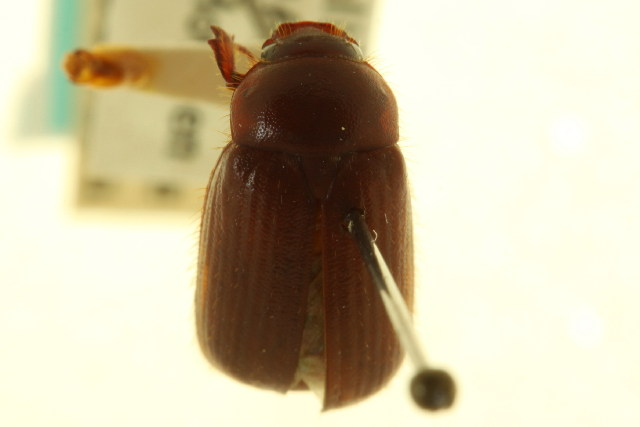

Scientific classification
- Kingdom: Animalia
- Phylum: Arthropoda
- Class: Insecta
- Order: Coleoptera
- Suborder: Polyphaga
- Infraorder: Scarabaeiformia
- Family: Scarabaeidae
- Genus: Serica
- Species: S. serotina

Binomial name
- Serica serotina LeConte, 1856

= Serica serotina =

Species of beetle

Serica serotina is a species of scarab beetle in the family Scarabaeidae. It is found in North America (California).

== Description ==
Adults reach a length of about 8–11 mm.
