= Serica setiensis =

Scientific classification
- Kingdom: Animalia
- Phylum: Arthropoda
- Class: Insecta
- Order: Coleoptera
- Suborder: Polyphaga
- Infraorder: Scarabaeiformia
- Family: Scarabaeidae
- Genus: Serica
- Species: S. setiensis

Binomial name
- Serica setiensis Rana, Fabrizi & Ahrens, 2017

Species of beetle

Serica setiensis is a species of beetle of the family Scarabaeidae. It is found in Nepal.

== Description ==
Adults reach a length of about 8.1 mm. They have a dark brown, oblong body. The antennae are yellowish and the legs and lateral pronotal margins are reddish brown. The dorsal surface is dull and sparsely setose.

== Etymology ==
The species name refers to its occurrence in the Seti province.
