= Serica pulvinosa =

Scientific classification
- Kingdom: Animalia
- Phylum: Arthropoda
- Class: Insecta
- Order: Coleoptera
- Suborder: Polyphaga
- Infraorder: Scarabaeiformia
- Family: Scarabaeidae
- Genus: Serica
- Species: S. pulvinosa

Binomial name
- Serica pulvinosa Frey, 1972

Synonyms
- Pachyserica taiwana Nomura, 1974; Serica albosquamosa Frey, 1972

Species of beetle

Serica pulvinosa is a species of beetle of the family Scarabaeidae. It is found in China (Fujian, Hubei, Hunan, Zhejiang) and Taiwan.

== Description ==
Adults reach a length of about 7.8 mm. They have a reddish-brown, elongate-oval body. The antennae are yellowish-brown. The surface is almost entirely covered with dull tomentum, except for the labroclypeus. The upper surface has numerous, short, white scale-like hairs and the elytra have a few erect scale-like setae.
