= Serica liboyani =

Scientific classification
- Kingdom: Animalia
- Phylum: Arthropoda
- Class: Insecta
- Order: Coleoptera
- Suborder: Polyphaga
- Infraorder: Scarabaeiformia
- Family: Scarabaeidae
- Genus: Serica
- Species: S. liboyani

Binomial name
- Serica liboyani Zhao & Ahrens, 2023

Species of beetle

Serica liboyani is a species of beetle of the family Scarabaeidae. It is found in China (Guizhou).

== Description ==
Adults reach a length of about 7.3 mm. They have a dark brown, elongated ovoid body. The head, pronotum, scutellum and pygidium are green, with a strong coppery luster. The elytra are yellowish brown with an irregular black pattern. The legs are reddish brown, and the antennae are yellowish brown.

== Etymology ==
The species is dedicated to Mr. Bo-Yan Li, a friend and teammate of the first author during a survey on Mount Leigongshan.
