= Serica umbrosa =

Scientific classification
- Kingdom: Animalia
- Phylum: Arthropoda
- Class: Insecta
- Order: Coleoptera
- Suborder: Polyphaga
- Infraorder: Scarabaeiformia
- Family: Scarabaeidae
- Genus: Serica
- Species: S. umbrosa

Binomial name
- Serica umbrosa Fairmaire, 1868

Species of beetle

Serica umbrosa is a species of beetle of the family Scarabaeidae. It is found in Madagascar.

== Description ==
Adults reach a length of about 7 mm. They have a very short, very convex, oval, dark bronze-brown, barely glossy body, covered with a fine, dense, velvety pubescence. The antennae, legs and abdomen are reddish-brown. The head is covered with large, fairly dense punctures. The pronotum is covered with fairly large, moderately dense, shallow punctures. The sides are rounded, slightly narrowed anteriorly and the posterior margin is broadly rounded. The elytra are short, no wider at the base than the pronotum, but widening rapidly, abruptly rounded, almost truncate posteriorly, with regular lines of punctures that do not form striations, each line having three slightly raised intervals.
