= Serica ribbei =

Scientific classification
- Kingdom: Animalia
- Phylum: Arthropoda
- Class: Insecta
- Order: Coleoptera
- Suborder: Polyphaga
- Infraorder: Scarabaeiformia
- Family: Scarabaeidae
- Genus: Serica
- Species: S. ribbei

Binomial name
- Serica ribbei Ahrens, 1999

Species of beetle

Serica ribbei is a species of beetle of the family Scarabaeidae. It is found in Nepal and India (Sikkim).

== Description ==
Adults reach a length of about 8.5–8.7 mm. They have a dark brown, elongate-oval body. The legs, margins of the pronotum and ventral surface are reddish-brown and the antennae are yellowish-brown. The upper surface is mostly dull.

== Etymology ==
The species is named after its collector, Carl Ribbe.
