= Serica adspersa =

Scientific classification
- Kingdom: Animalia
- Phylum: Arthropoda
- Class: Insecta
- Order: Coleoptera
- Suborder: Polyphaga
- Infraorder: Scarabaeiformia
- Family: Scarabaeidae
- Genus: Serica
- Species: S. adspersa

Binomial name
- Serica adspersa (Frey, 1972)

Synonyms
- Trichoserica adspersa Frey, 1972

Species of beetle

Serica adspersa is a species of beetle of the family Scarabaeidae. It is found in China (Fujian, Jiangxi).

== Description ==
Adults reach a length of about 10.6 mm. They have a reddish brown, oval body. The elytra and pygidium are yellowish brown, the former with dense small dark spots. The antennae are yellow. The dorsal surface is almost glabrous.
