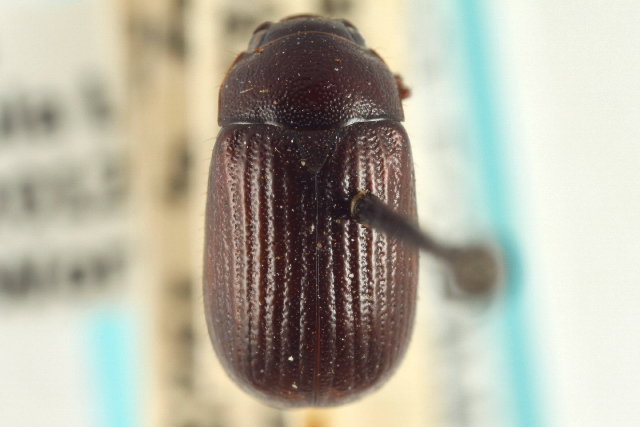

Scientific classification
- Kingdom: Animalia
- Phylum: Arthropoda
- Class: Insecta
- Order: Coleoptera
- Suborder: Polyphaga
- Infraorder: Scarabaeiformia
- Family: Scarabaeidae
- Genus: Serica
- Species: S. atratula

Binomial name
- Serica atratula LeConte, 1856

= Serica atratula =

Species of beetle

Serica atratula is a species of beetle of the family Scarabaeidae. It is found in the United States (Louisiana, Oklahoma, Texas).

== Description ==
Adults reach a length of about 6 mm. The colour is piceous black and the surface is polished and shining.

== Subspecies ==
- Serica atratula atratula (Oklahoma, Texas)
- Serica atratula monita Dawson, 1947 (Louisiana, Oklahoma, Texas)
