= Serica chautarana =

Scientific classification
- Kingdom: Animalia
- Phylum: Arthropoda
- Class: Insecta
- Order: Coleoptera
- Suborder: Polyphaga
- Infraorder: Scarabaeiformia
- Family: Scarabaeidae
- Genus: Serica
- Species: S. chautarana

Binomial name
- Serica chautarana Ahrens, 2005

Species of beetle

Serica chautarana is a species of beetle of the family Scarabaeidae. It is found in central Nepal.
