= Serica kingdoni =

Scientific classification
- Kingdom: Animalia
- Phylum: Arthropoda
- Class: Insecta
- Order: Coleoptera
- Suborder: Polyphaga
- Infraorder: Scarabaeiformia
- Family: Scarabaeidae
- Genus: Serica
- Species: S. kingdoni

Binomial name
- Serica kingdoni Ahrens, 1999

Species of beetle

Serica kingdoni is a species of beetle of the family Scarabaeidae. It is found in China (Gansu, Sichuan, Xizang, Yunnan).

== Description ==
Adults reach a length of about 9.8 mm. They have a reddish-brown, elongate body. The legs and antennae are yellowish. The upper surface is mostly dull, sometimes with long, erect hairs.

== Etymology ==
The species is named after its collector, F. Kingdon.
