= Serica sphaerica =

Scientific classification
- Kingdom: Animalia
- Phylum: Arthropoda
- Class: Insecta
- Order: Coleoptera
- Suborder: Polyphaga
- Infraorder: Scarabaeiformia
- Family: Scarabaeidae
- Genus: Serica
- Species: S. sphaerica

Binomial name
- Serica sphaerica Burmeister, 1855

Species of beetle

Serica sphaerica is a species of beetle of the family Scarabaeidae. It is found in eastern India.

== Description ==
Adults reach a length of about 6.6 mm. They are dull, reddish-yellow, with shiny legs. The clypeus is broad, almost short, slightly emarginate anteriorly, coarsely and densely wrinkled-punctate, the frons behind the suture with a pitted impression on each side, deeply and coarsely punctate. The pronotum is slightly projecting forward in the middle at the anterior margin, rounded at the sides, with rounded hind angles. The scutellum is short. The elytra are punctate in rows within the striae, the intervals are evenly punctate, slightly raised without a punctate-free center.
