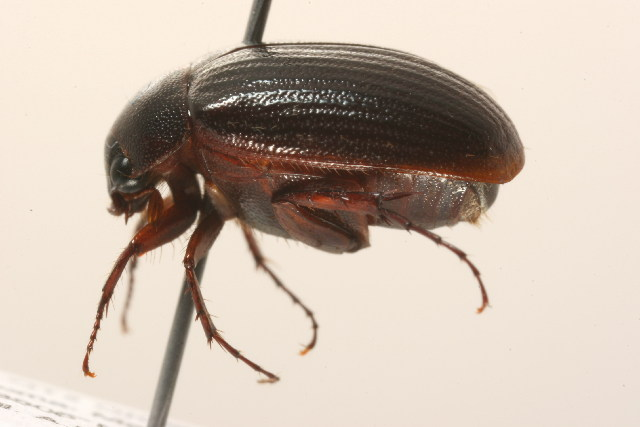

Scientific classification
- Kingdom: Animalia
- Phylum: Arthropoda
- Class: Insecta
- Order: Coleoptera
- Suborder: Polyphaga
- Infraorder: Scarabaeiformia
- Family: Scarabaeidae
- Genus: Serica
- Species: S. campestris

Binomial name
- Serica campestris Dawson, 1919

= Serica campestris =

Species of beetle

Serica campestris is a species of scarab beetle in the family Scarabaeidae. It is found in North America (Iowa, Nebraska, Texas).

== Description ==
Adults reach a length of about 8.5 mm. The colour is very dark mahogany. The upper surface is bare, polished and shining, without any trace of sericeous or pruinose luster.
