= Serica chunlinlii =

Scientific classification
- Kingdom: Animalia
- Phylum: Arthropoda
- Class: Insecta
- Order: Coleoptera
- Suborder: Polyphaga
- Infraorder: Scarabaeiformia
- Family: Scarabaeidae
- Genus: Serica
- Species: S. chunlinlii

Binomial name
- Serica chunlinlii (Ahrens, 2002)

Synonyms
- Taiwanoserica chunlinlii Ahrens, 2002

Species of beetle

Serica chunlinlii is a species of beetle of the family Scarabaeidae. It is found in Taiwan.

== Description ==
Adults reach a length of about 9 mm. They have a reddish brown, oblong body. The antennae and elytra are yellow with dark spots. The dorsal surface is dull and almost glabrous, except for a few fine hairs on the head and the elytra.

== Etymology ==
The species is named after its collector, Chun-Lin Li.
