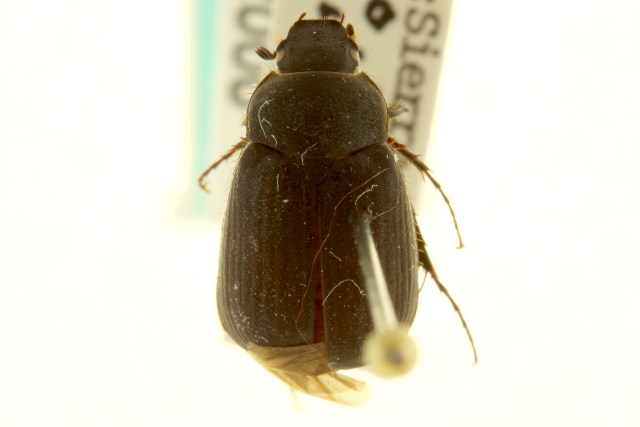

Scientific classification
- Kingdom: Animalia
- Phylum: Arthropoda
- Clade: Pancrustacea
- Class: Insecta
- Order: Coleoptera
- Suborder: Polyphaga
- Infraorder: Scarabaeiformia
- Family: Scarabaeidae
- Genus: Serica
- Species: S. anthracina

Binomial name
- Serica anthracina LeConte, 1856

Synonyms
- Serica crassata Walker, 1866; Serica frontalis LeConte, 1856; Serica robusta LeConte, 1856; Serica valida Harold, 1869

= Serica anthracina =

Species of beetle

Serica anthracina is a species of scarab beetle in the family Scarabaeidae. It is found in North America (Alberta, British Columbia, Saskatchewan, California, Colorado, Montana, Nebraska, New Mexico, Oregon, South Dakota).

== Description ==
Adults reach a length of about 5–8.5 mm. The colour varies from uniform testaceous to black.
