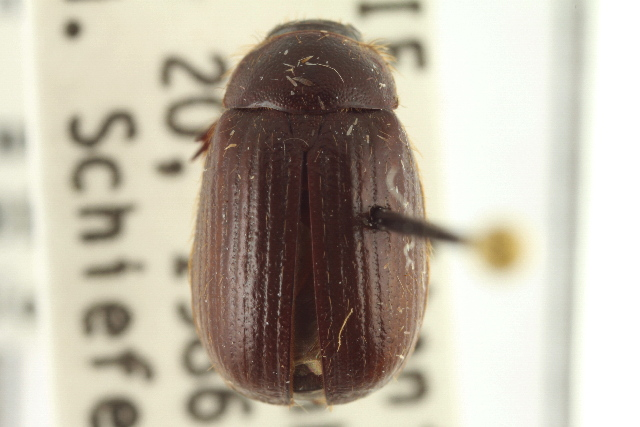

Scientific classification
- Kingdom: Animalia
- Phylum: Arthropoda
- Class: Insecta
- Order: Coleoptera
- Suborder: Polyphaga
- Infraorder: Scarabaeiformia
- Family: Scarabaeidae
- Genus: Serica
- Species: S. chicoensis

Binomial name
- Serica chicoensis Saylor, 1939

= Serica chicoensis =

Species of beetle

Serica chicoensis is a species of beetle of the family Scarabaeidae. It is found in the United States (California).

== Description ==
Adults reach a length of about 7.5 mm. The colour is light buff-testaceous, with the head and thorax more brownish. The surface is faintly pruinose and glabrous, except for a few scattered and inconspicuous short hairs on the elytra, sides of the thorax, and clypeus.
