= Serica emaw =

Scientific classification
- Kingdom: Animalia
- Phylum: Arthropoda
- Class: Insecta
- Order: Coleoptera
- Suborder: Polyphaga
- Infraorder: Scarabaeiformia
- Family: Scarabaeidae
- Genus: Serica
- Species: S. emaw

Binomial name
- Serica emaw Ahrens, Fabrizi & Liu, 2022

Species of beetle

Serica emaw is a species of beetle of the family Scarabaeidae. It is found in Myanmar.

== Description ==
Adults reach a length of about 7.8 mm. They have a dark reddish brown, elongate eggshaped body, partly with a greenish shine. The elytra have dark spots, the antennae are yellowish and the legs are brown. The dorsal surface is dull and densely covered with short yellow setae.

== Etymology ==
The species name is refers to its type locality close to Emaw mountain.
