= Serica lodingi =

Scientific classification
- Kingdom: Animalia
- Phylum: Arthropoda
- Class: Insecta
- Order: Coleoptera
- Suborder: Polyphaga
- Infraorder: Scarabaeiformia
- Family: Scarabaeidae
- Genus: Serica
- Species: S. lodingi

Binomial name
- Serica lodingi Dawson, 1952

Species of beetle

Serica lodingi is a species of beetle of the family Scarabaeidae. It is found in the United States (Alabama, Tennessee).

== Description ==
Adults reach a length of about 11 mm. The colour is dark, opaque, chocolate brown with an iridescent luster.
