= Serica feisintsiensis =

Scientific classification
- Kingdom: Animalia
- Phylum: Arthropoda
- Class: Insecta
- Order: Coleoptera
- Suborder: Polyphaga
- Infraorder: Scarabaeiformia
- Family: Scarabaeidae
- Genus: Serica
- Species: S. feisintsiensis

Binomial name
- Serica feisintsiensis Ahrens, 2007

Species of beetle

Serica feisintsiensis is a species of beetle of the family Scarabaeidae. It is found in China (Shaanxi, Sichuan).

== Description ==
Adults reach a length of about 7.5 mm. They have a yellow to reddish-brown, elongate-oval body, without a green sheen. The antennae are yellowish-brown and the legs are reddish-brown. The surface is dull, except for the shiny labroclypeus. The upper surface has fine, loosely and evenly distributed white scale-like hairs as well as individual, white scale-like setae. The elytra have a dark preapical spot.

== Etymology ==
The species name refers to its type locality, the Fei Sin Tsi Pass.
