= Serica huangjing =

Scientific classification
- Kingdom: Animalia
- Phylum: Arthropoda
- Class: Insecta
- Order: Coleoptera
- Suborder: Polyphaga
- Infraorder: Scarabaeiformia
- Family: Scarabaeidae
- Genus: Serica
- Species: S. huangjing

Binomial name
- Serica huangjing Ahrens, Fabrizi & Liu, 2022

Species of beetle

Serica huangjing is a species of beetle of the family Scarabaeidae. It is found in China (Guizhou, Sichuan).

== Description ==
Adults reach a length of about 7.5–7.6 mm. They have a dark reddish brown, dull, oval body. The elytra are yellow brown with numerous dark spots. The ventral surface and legs are reddish brown, and the antennae are yellow. The dorsal surface is almost glabrous, except for some single and short, white setae on the pronotum and elytra.

== Etymology ==
The species is named after its type locality, Huangjing.
