= Serica plutenkoi =

Scientific classification
- Kingdom: Animalia
- Phylum: Arthropoda
- Class: Insecta
- Order: Coleoptera
- Suborder: Polyphaga
- Infraorder: Scarabaeiformia
- Family: Scarabaeidae
- Genus: Serica
- Species: S. plutenkoi

Binomial name
- Serica plutenkoi Ahrens, 2005

Species of beetle

Serica plutenkoi is a species of beetle of the family Scarabaeidae. It is found in China (Henan, Hubei, Ningxia, Shaanxi).
