= Serica liyitengi =

Scientific classification
- Kingdom: Animalia
- Phylum: Arthropoda
- Class: Insecta
- Order: Coleoptera
- Suborder: Polyphaga
- Infraorder: Scarabaeiformia
- Family: Scarabaeidae
- Genus: Serica
- Species: S. liyitengi

Binomial name
- Serica liyitengi Ahrens, Zhao, Pham & Liu, 2024

Species of beetle

Serica liyitengi is a species of beetle of the family Scarabaeidae. It is found in China (Guangxi).

== Description ==
Adults reach a length of about 10–10.2 mm. They have a dark brown, oblong body, with the head even darker. The legs are reddish brown, the antennae yellow and the elytra have large, dark spots (while the punctures on the elytra are lighter). The dorsal surface is dull and glabrous, except for dense and long pilosity on the frons. The elytra have sparse, short, white setae.

== Etymology ==
The species is named after Mr. Yi-Teng Li.
