= Serica floridana =

Scientific classification
- Kingdom: Animalia
- Phylum: Arthropoda
- Class: Insecta
- Order: Coleoptera
- Suborder: Polyphaga
- Infraorder: Scarabaeiformia
- Family: Scarabaeidae
- Genus: Serica
- Species: S. floridana

Binomial name
- Serica floridana Dawson, 1967

Species of beetle

Serica floridana is a species of beetle of the family Scarabaeidae. It is found in the United States (Alabama, Florida, Georgia, Mississippi, New Jersey, North Carolina).

== Description ==
Adults reach a length of about 7 mm. The colour is light chestnut brown. The surface is glabrous and shining with no bloom or iridescence.
