= Serica rubricollis =

Scientific classification
- Kingdom: Animalia
- Phylum: Arthropoda
- Class: Insecta
- Order: Coleoptera
- Suborder: Polyphaga
- Infraorder: Scarabaeiformia
- Family: Scarabaeidae
- Genus: Serica
- Species: S. rubricollis

Binomial name
- Serica rubricollis (Blanchard, 1850)

Synonyms
- Omaloplia rubricollis Blanchard, 1850

Species of beetle

Serica rubricollis is a species of beetle of the family Scarabaeidae. It is found in Indonesia (Seram Island).

== Description ==
Adults reach a length of about 8–9 mm. They have an elongate, red, silky-glossy body, with the pronotum slightly darker in the middle, and the elytra dark brown with a brownish sheen, reddish at the base and shoulders. The underside is yellowish-red.
