= Serica sticta =

Scientific classification
- Kingdom: Animalia
- Phylum: Arthropoda
- Class: Insecta
- Order: Coleoptera
- Suborder: Polyphaga
- Infraorder: Scarabaeiformia
- Family: Scarabaeidae
- Genus: Serica
- Species: S. sticta

Binomial name
- Serica sticta Ahrens & Fabrizi, 2009

Species of beetle

Serica sticta is a species of beetle of the family Scarabaeidae. It is found in Bhutan and India (Arunachal Pradesh).

== Description ==
Adults reach a length of about 7.7–8.3 mm. They have a yellowish, oblong body. The head is black and the disc of the pronotum and a spot on the elytra are light brown. The dorsal surface is shiny and sparsely setose, except for some long erect, long setae on the elytra.

== Etymology ==
The species name is derived from Latin sticta (meaning with points) and refers to the colour patters of the species.
