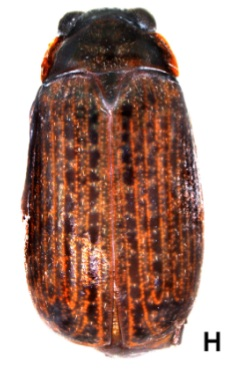

Scientific classification
- Kingdom: Animalia
- Phylum: Arthropoda
- Class: Insecta
- Order: Coleoptera
- Suborder: Polyphaga
- Infraorder: Scarabaeiformia
- Family: Scarabaeidae
- Genus: Serica
- Species: S. tashigaonensis

Binomial name
- Serica tashigaonensis Sreedevi, Ranasinghe, Fabrizi & Ahrens, 2019

= Serica tashigaonensis =

Species of beetle

Serica tashigaonensis is a species of beetle of the family Scarabaeidae. It is found in Nepal.

== Description ==
Adults reach a length of about 9.4 mm. They have a dark brown, oblong body, with yellowish antennae and legs. The ventral parts and punctures on the elytra are reddish brown. The dorsal surface is dull. The frons, pronotum and elytra have sparse, adpressed white setae.

== Etymology ==
The species name refers to the type locality close to Tashigaon.
