= Serica lama =

Scientific classification
- Kingdom: Animalia
- Phylum: Arthropoda
- Class: Insecta
- Order: Coleoptera
- Suborder: Polyphaga
- Infraorder: Scarabaeiformia
- Family: Scarabaeidae
- Genus: Serica
- Species: S. lama

Binomial name
- Serica lama Ahrens, 1999

Species of beetle

Serica lama is a species of beetle of the family Scarabaeidae. It is found in India (Sikkim).

== Description ==
Adults reach a length of about 8.1–10 mm. They have a dark chestnut brown, elongate-oval body, with the legs and margins of the pronotum somewhat lighter. The antennae are yellowish-brown. The upper surface is mostly dull and has a few erect white hairs.
