= Serica mixta =

Scientific classification
- Kingdom: Animalia
- Phylum: Arthropoda
- Class: Insecta
- Order: Coleoptera
- Suborder: Polyphaga
- Infraorder: Scarabaeiformia
- Family: Scarabaeidae
- Genus: Serica
- Species: S. mixta

Binomial name
- Serica mixta LeConte, 1856

Species of beetle

Serica mixta is a species of beetle of the family Scarabaeidae. It is found in the United States (California).

== Description ==
Adults reach a length of about 7.5 mm. The colour is brownish testaceous (argus brown). The surface is somewhat opaque and dulled by a sericeous bloom.
