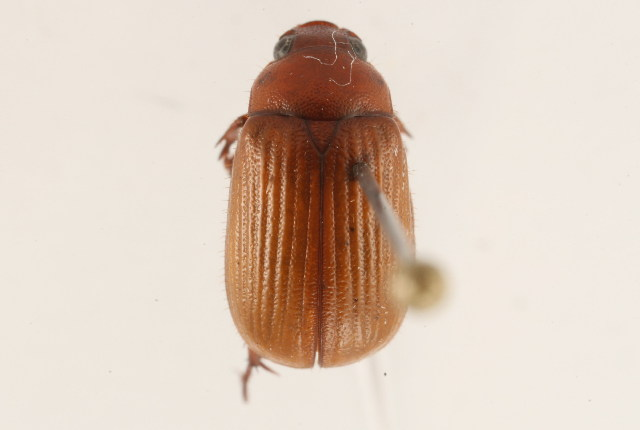

Scientific classification
- Kingdom: Animalia
- Phylum: Arthropoda
- Class: Insecta
- Order: Coleoptera
- Suborder: Polyphaga
- Infraorder: Scarabaeiformia
- Family: Scarabaeidae
- Genus: Serica
- Species: S. ochrosoma

Binomial name
- Serica ochrosoma Dawson, 1919

= Serica ochrosoma =

Species of beetle

Serica ochrosoma is a species of beetle of the family Scarabaeidae. It is found in the United States (Kansas, Nebraska).

== Description ==
Adults reach a length of about 7.5 mm. The colour is dull yellowish brown. The upper surface is bare, polished and shining.
