= Serica hailuogou =

Scientific classification
- Kingdom: Animalia
- Phylum: Arthropoda
- Class: Insecta
- Order: Coleoptera
- Suborder: Polyphaga
- Infraorder: Scarabaeiformia
- Family: Scarabaeidae
- Genus: Serica
- Species: S. hailuogou

Binomial name
- Serica hailuogou Ahrens, Fabrizi & Liu, 2022

Species of beetle

Serica hailuogou is a species of beetle of the family Scarabaeidae. It is found in China (Sichuan).

== Description ==
Adults reach a length of about 8 mm. They have a dark reddish brown, dull, oval body. The elytra have yellow spots, and the ventral surface and legs are reddish brown. The antennae are yellow. The dorsal surface is almost glabrous, except for some single and short, white setae on the pronotum and elytra.

== Etymology ==
The species is named after its type locality, Hailuogou.
