= Serica regia =

Scientific classification
- Kingdom: Animalia
- Phylum: Arthropoda
- Class: Insecta
- Order: Coleoptera
- Suborder: Polyphaga
- Infraorder: Scarabaeiformia
- Family: Scarabaeidae
- Genus: Serica
- Species: S. regia

Binomial name
- Serica regia Brenske, 1894

Species of beetle

Serica regia is a species of beetle of the family Scarabaeidae. It is found in Indonesia (Java).

== Description ==
Adults reach a length of about 10 mm. The upper surface is dark brown, and the underside is slightly lighter. The frons is very finely and widely punctured, while the middle area unpunctate. The thorax is very finely and fairly densely punctured, with a few hairs along the lateral margin. The elytra are light yellow and streaked with punctures.
