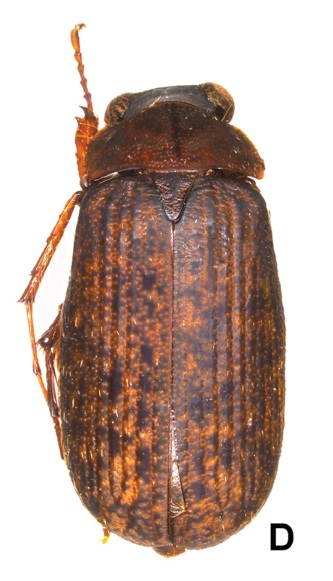

Scientific classification
- Kingdom: Animalia
- Phylum: Arthropoda
- Clade: Pancrustacea
- Class: Insecta
- Order: Coleoptera
- Suborder: Polyphaga
- Infraorder: Scarabaeiformia
- Family: Scarabaeidae
- Genus: Serica
- Species: S. basantapurensis

Binomial name
- Serica basantapurensis Sreedevi, Speer, Fabrizi & Ahrens, 2018

= Serica basantapurensis =

Species of beetle

Serica basantapurensis is a species of beetle of the family Scarabaeidae. It is found in Nepal.

== Description ==
Adults reach a length of about 8.8 mm. They have a dark brown, oblong body. The antennae are yellowish and the elytra, legs, and lateral pronotal margins are reddish brown, with a few dark impunctate spots on the elytra. The dorsal surface is dull and sparsely setose.

== Etymology ==
The species name refers to its type locality, close to Basantapur (Nepal).
