= Serica silviae =

Scientific classification
- Kingdom: Animalia
- Phylum: Arthropoda
- Class: Insecta
- Order: Coleoptera
- Suborder: Polyphaga
- Infraorder: Scarabaeiformia
- Family: Scarabaeidae
- Genus: Serica
- Species: S. silviae

Binomial name
- Serica silviae Ahrens, 2009

Species of beetle

Serica silviae is a species of beetle of the family Scarabaeidae. It is found in China (Sichuan).

== Description ==
Adults reach a length of about 8.7 mm. They have a reddish brown, oblong body. The antennae and elytra are yellow with dark spots. The dorsal surface is dull and sparsely setose.

== Etymology ==
The species is dedicated to the wife of the author, Silvia Fabrizi.
