= Serica bhaktai =

Scientific classification
- Kingdom: Animalia
- Phylum: Arthropoda
- Class: Insecta
- Order: Coleoptera
- Suborder: Polyphaga
- Infraorder: Scarabaeiformia
- Family: Scarabaeidae
- Genus: Serica
- Species: S. bhaktai

Binomial name
- Serica bhaktai Ahrens, 1999

Species of beetle

Serica bhaktai is a species of beetle of the family Scarabaeidae. It is found in central Nepal.

== Description ==
Adults reach a length of about 8.9-9.9 mm. They have a reddish-brown, elongate body, with the head darker. There are numerous small, dark spots on the elytra. The upper surface is mostly dull and has a few hairs.
