= Serica baoshan =

Scientific classification
- Kingdom: Animalia
- Phylum: Arthropoda
- Class: Insecta
- Order: Coleoptera
- Suborder: Polyphaga
- Infraorder: Scarabaeiformia
- Family: Scarabaeidae
- Genus: Serica
- Species: S. baoshan

Binomial name
- Serica baoshan Ahrens, Fabrizi & Liu, 2022

Species of beetle

Serica baoshan is a species of beetle of the family Scarabaeidae. It is found in China (Yunnan).

== Description ==
Adults reach a length of about 6.1–6.9 mm. They have a brown, elongate body. The legs are slightly lighter. The surface is dull, the elytra with several slightly darker impunctate spots, and partly iridescent. The antennae are yellow. The dorsal surface is densely covered with short, pale setae.

== Etymology ==
The species is named after its type locality, Baoshan.
