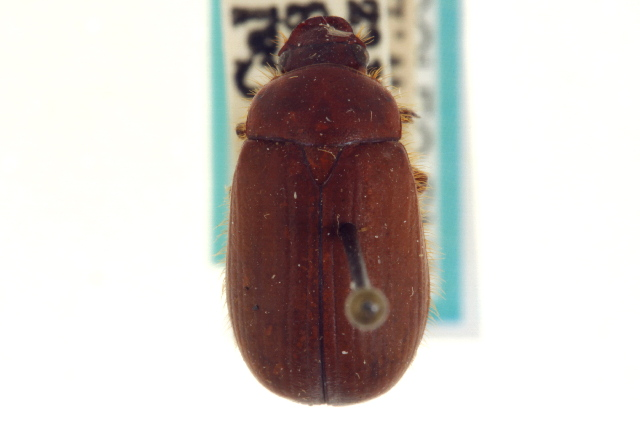

Scientific classification
- Kingdom: Animalia
- Phylum: Arthropoda
- Class: Insecta
- Order: Coleoptera
- Suborder: Polyphaga
- Infraorder: Scarabaeiformia
- Family: Scarabaeidae
- Genus: Serica
- Species: S. acicula

Binomial name
- Serica acicula Dawson, 1932

= Serica acicula =

Species of beetle

Serica acicula is a species of beetle of the family Scarabaeidae. It is found in the United States (California).

== Description ==
Adults reach a length of about 9 mm. The colour is testaceous (auburn), opaque, with a silvery grey bloom or powder on the elytra.
