= Serica benesi =

Scientific classification
- Kingdom: Animalia
- Phylum: Arthropoda
- Class: Insecta
- Order: Coleoptera
- Suborder: Polyphaga
- Infraorder: Scarabaeiformia
- Family: Scarabaeidae
- Genus: Serica
- Species: S. benesi

Binomial name
- Serica benesi Ahrens, 2005

Species of beetle

Serica benesi is a species of beetle of the family Scarabaeidae. It is found in China (Gansu, Henan, Hubei, Ningxia, Qinghai, Shaanxi, Shanxi, Sichuan, Yunnan).
