= Serica kumaonensis =

Scientific classification
- Kingdom: Animalia
- Phylum: Arthropoda
- Class: Insecta
- Order: Coleoptera
- Suborder: Polyphaga
- Infraorder: Scarabaeiformia
- Family: Scarabaeidae
- Genus: Serica
- Species: S. kumaonensis

Binomial name
- Serica kumaonensis Ahrens, 1999

Species of beetle

Serica kumaonensis is a species of beetle of the family Scarabaeidae. It is found in Myanmar and India (Uttarakhand).

== Description ==
Adults reach a length of about 8.7 mm. They have a dark brown, elongate body. The legs and ventral surface are reddish-brown and the antennae are yellowish-brown. The upper surface is mostly dull.
