= Serica lagoi =

Scientific classification
- Kingdom: Animalia
- Phylum: Arthropoda
- Class: Insecta
- Order: Coleoptera
- Suborder: Polyphaga
- Infraorder: Scarabaeiformia
- Family: Scarabaeidae
- Genus: Serica
- Species: S. lagoi

Binomial name
- Serica lagoi Ahrens, 2007

Species of beetle

Serica lagoi is a species of beetle of the family Scarabaeidae. It is found in Thailand.

== Description ==
Adults reach a length of about 6.7–7.2 mm. They have a dark reddish-brown, partially dark greenish-brown, elongate-oval body. The antennae and legs are brown. The surface is entirely dull or iridescent, except for the shiny labroclypeus. The upper surface has dense, fine, white scale-like hairs as well as individual, erect, long, white scale-like setae.

== Etymology ==
The species is named after Paul Lago.
