= Serica abdita =

Scientific classification
- Kingdom: Animalia
- Phylum: Arthropoda
- Class: Insecta
- Order: Coleoptera
- Suborder: Polyphaga
- Infraorder: Scarabaeiformia
- Family: Scarabaeidae
- Genus: Serica
- Species: S. abdita

Binomial name
- Serica abdita Dawson, 1921

Species of beetle

Serica abdita is a species of beetle of the family Scarabaeidae. It is found in the United States (California).

== Description ==
Adults reach a length of about 7 mm. The colour is brownish testaceous (argus brown). The surface is not polished, but somewhat opaque or pollenose with more or less of a sericeous, iridescent luster.
