= Serica ziqingi =

Scientific classification
- Kingdom: Animalia
- Phylum: Arthropoda
- Class: Insecta
- Order: Coleoptera
- Suborder: Polyphaga
- Infraorder: Scarabaeiformia
- Family: Scarabaeidae
- Genus: Serica
- Species: S. ziqingi

Binomial name
- Serica ziqingi Ahrens, Fabrizi & Liu, 2022

Species of beetle

Serica ziqingi is a species of beetle of the family Scarabaeidae. It is found in China (Guangxi).

== Description ==
Adults reach a length of about 8.1 mm. They have a dark brown, dull, elongate body. The labroclypeus, anterior frons and anterior pronotum are shiny and the ventral surface and legs are reddish brown. The elytra has yellow spots and the antennae are yellow. The dorsal surface is almost glabrous, except for single and short, white setae on the pronotum and elytra.

== Etymology ==
The species is named after its collector, Wang Ziqing.
