= Serica thibetana =

Scientific classification
- Kingdom: Animalia
- Phylum: Arthropoda
- Class: Insecta
- Order: Coleoptera
- Suborder: Polyphaga
- Infraorder: Scarabaeiformia
- Family: Scarabaeidae
- Genus: Serica
- Species: S. thibetana

Binomial name
- Serica thibetana Brenske, 1897

Synonyms
- Serica (Ophthalmoserica) umbrinella Brenske, 1898

Species of beetle

Serica thibetana is a species of beetle of the family Scarabaeidae. It is found in the Himalaya, including Tibet, Pakistan, India and Nepal.

== Description ==
Adults reach a length of about 7.2-9.3 mm. They have a reddish-brown, elongate-oval body. The antennae are yellowish-brown. The upper surface is mostly dull and has a few erect white hairs.
