= Serica xizang =

Scientific classification
- Kingdom: Animalia
- Phylum: Arthropoda
- Class: Insecta
- Order: Coleoptera
- Suborder: Polyphaga
- Infraorder: Scarabaeiformia
- Family: Scarabaeidae
- Genus: Serica
- Species: S. xizang

Binomial name
- Serica xizang Ahrens, Zhao, Pham & Liu, 2024

Species of beetle

Serica xizang is a species of beetle of the family Scarabaeidae. It is found in China (Xizang).

== Description ==
Adults reach a length of about 7.2–7.5 mm. They have a brown, oblong body, with a darker head. The antennae are yellow, the legs reddish brown and the punctures on the elytra lighter. The dorsal surface is dull, the elytra with sparse, moderately long, white setae, but otherwise glabrous.

== Etymology ==
The species name refers to its occurrence in Xizang.
