= Serica subansiriensis =

Scientific classification
- Kingdom: Animalia
- Phylum: Arthropoda
- Class: Insecta
- Order: Coleoptera
- Suborder: Polyphaga
- Infraorder: Scarabaeiformia
- Family: Scarabaeidae
- Genus: Serica
- Species: S. subansiriensis

Binomial name
- Serica subansiriensis Gupta, Bhunia, Ahrens & Chandra, 2025

Species of beetle

Serica subansiriensis is a species of beetle of the family Scarabaeidae. It is found in India (Arunachal Pradesh).

== Description ==
Adults reach a length of about 7.1 mm. They have a dark reddish brown, oblong body. The antennae are yellowish and the legs are reddish brown. The dorsal surface is sparsely setose and dull, except for the head.

== Etymology ==
The species is named after its type locality.
