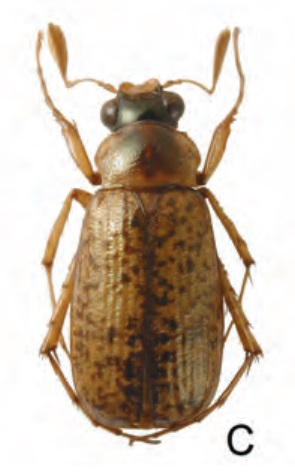

Scientific classification
- Kingdom: Animalia
- Phylum: Arthropoda
- Class: Insecta
- Order: Coleoptera
- Suborder: Polyphaga
- Infraorder: Scarabaeiformia
- Family: Scarabaeidae
- Genus: Serica
- Species: S. arborea

Binomial name
- Serica arborea Ahrens, 1999

= Serica arborea =

Species of beetle

Serica arborea is a species of beetle of the family Scarabaeidae. It is found in central Nepal and China (Xizang).

== Description ==
Adults reach a length of about 6.9 mm. They have a yellowish-brown, elongate body. The forehead and small markings on the elytra are dark. The upper surface is shiny and glabrous, except for some erect setae on the head and elytra
