= Serica duplex =

Scientific classification
- Kingdom: Animalia
- Phylum: Arthropoda
- Class: Insecta
- Order: Coleoptera
- Suborder: Polyphaga
- Infraorder: Scarabaeiformia
- Family: Scarabaeidae
- Genus: Serica
- Species: S. duplex

Binomial name
- Serica duplex Sharp, 1876

Species of beetle

Serica duplex is a species of beetle of the family Scarabaeidae. It is found in Indonesia (Java).

== Description ==
Adults reach a length of about 7.5 mm. They have a short, rounded-ovate, densely tomentose, vividly glossy, golden to dark purple body, which is silky opalescent underneath. The pronotum is not projecting forward at the anterior margin, but here and on the sides with setae. The hind angles are rounded. The elytra have fine rows of punctures, with the intervals conspicuously finely punctate.
