= Serica tongluana =

Scientific classification
- Kingdom: Animalia
- Phylum: Arthropoda
- Class: Insecta
- Order: Coleoptera
- Suborder: Polyphaga
- Infraorder: Scarabaeiformia
- Family: Scarabaeidae
- Genus: Serica
- Species: S. tongluana

Binomial name
- Serica tongluana Ahrens, 1999

Species of beetle

Serica tongluana is a species of beetle of the family Scarabaeidae. It is found in China (Xizang), India (Sikkim) and Nepal.

== Description ==
Adults reach a length of about 7-7.4 mm. They have a dark brown, elongate body. The ventral surface and the legs are reddish-brown, while the antennae are yellowish. The upper surface is mostly dull, except for the shiny head.
