= Serica taiyal =

Scientific classification
- Kingdom: Animalia
- Phylum: Arthropoda
- Class: Insecta
- Order: Coleoptera
- Suborder: Polyphaga
- Infraorder: Scarabaeiformia
- Family: Scarabaeidae
- Genus: Serica
- Species: S. taiyal

Binomial name
- Serica taiyal (Kobayashi & Yu, 2000)

Synonyms
- Taiwanoserica taiyal Kobayashi & Yu, 2000

Species of beetle

Serica taiyal is a species of beetle of the family Scarabaeidae. It is found in Taiwan.

== Description ==
Adults reach a length of about 8.3–8.9 mm. They have a light reddish brown or dark reddish brown elongate oval body, with the clypeus, tibiae and tarsi reddish brown, the posterior part of head blackish brown to dark reddish brown and the antennae yellowish brown. The dorsal surface is mottled with blackish patches. The surface of the body is opaque, with the clypeus, antennae and legs shining.

== Etymology ==
The species is named after a group of indigenous people who live in the high mountain ranges of Taiwan.
