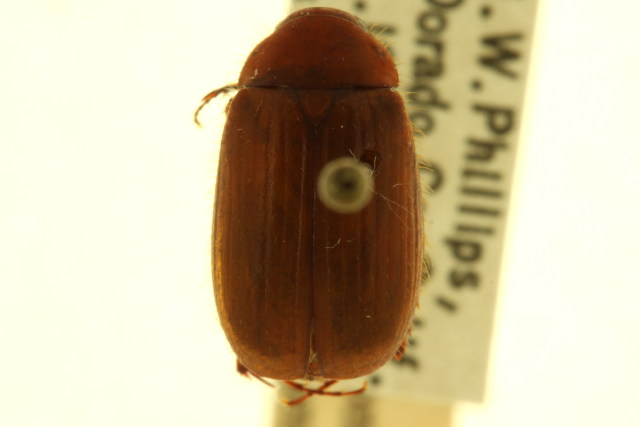

Scientific classification
- Kingdom: Animalia
- Phylum: Arthropoda
- Class: Insecta
- Order: Coleoptera
- Suborder: Polyphaga
- Infraorder: Scarabaeiformia
- Family: Scarabaeidae
- Genus: Serica
- Species: S. falcata

Binomial name
- Serica falcata Dawson, 1933

= Serica falcata =

Species of beetle

Serica falcata is a species of beetle of the family Scarabaeidae. It is found in the United States (California, Nevada, Oregon, Washington).

== Description ==
Adults reach a length of about 8 mm. The colour is brown (amber to argus). The surface is opaque and the elytra have a distinct, greyish bloom or pollen and have a trace of iridescence.
