= Serica polita =

Scientific classification
- Kingdom: Animalia
- Phylum: Arthropoda
- Class: Insecta
- Order: Coleoptera
- Suborder: Polyphaga
- Infraorder: Scarabaeiformia
- Family: Scarabaeidae
- Genus: Serica
- Species: S. polita

Binomial name
- Serica polita (Gebler, 1832)

Synonyms
- Omaloplia polita Gebler, 1832; Serica lutea Kim & Kim, 2003

Species of beetle

Serica polita is a species of beetle of the family Scarabaeidae. It is found in China (Ningxia), Mongolia, South Korea and Russia (the Russian Far East and Siberia).

== Description ==
Adults reach a length of about 6-9.5 mm. They have a shiny, yellow, elongate oval body. The elytra are yellowish brown to light brown.
