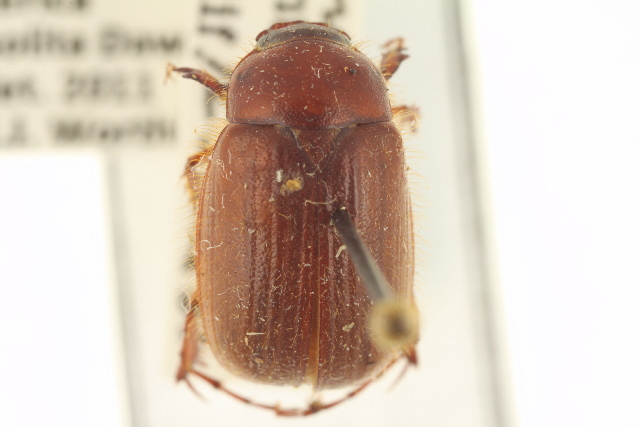

Scientific classification
- Kingdom: Animalia
- Phylum: Arthropoda
- Class: Insecta
- Order: Coleoptera
- Suborder: Polyphaga
- Infraorder: Scarabaeiformia
- Family: Scarabaeidae
- Genus: Serica
- Species: S. solita

Binomial name
- Serica solita Dawson, 1922

= Serica solita =

Species of beetle

Serica solita is a species of beetle of the family Scarabaeidae. It is found in the United States (California).

== Description ==
Adults reach a length of about 8.2 mm. The colour is dark auburn and subopaque, with traces of a metallic iridescence, but the iridescence and surface luster are somewhat obscured by short, erect, ochraceous hairs.
