= Serica granulosa =

Scientific classification
- Kingdom: Animalia
- Phylum: Arthropoda
- Class: Insecta
- Order: Coleoptera
- Suborder: Polyphaga
- Infraorder: Scarabaeiformia
- Family: Scarabaeidae
- Genus: Serica
- Species: S. granulosa

Binomial name
- Serica granulosa (Blanchard, 1850)

Synonyms
- Omaloplia granulosa Blanchard, 1850

Species of beetle

Serica granulosa is a species of beetle of the family Scarabaeidae. It is found in Madagascar.

== Description ==
Adults reach a length of about 9–10 mm. They are yellow and smooth, with a punctate-rugose head and testaceous antennae. The pronotum is very densely punctate and the elytra are shiny, furrowed and punctate. The legs and abdomen testaceous, punctate and sparsely hairy.
