= Serica karafutoensis =

Scientific classification
- Kingdom: Animalia
- Phylum: Arthropoda
- Class: Insecta
- Order: Coleoptera
- Suborder: Polyphaga
- Infraorder: Scarabaeiformia
- Family: Scarabaeidae
- Genus: Serica
- Species: S. karafutoensis

Binomial name
- Serica karafutoensis Niijima & Kinoshita, 1923

Species of beetle

Serica karafutoensis is a species of beetle of the family Scarabaeidae. It is found in Japan and the Russian Far East.

== Description ==
Adults reach a length of about 8–9.5 mm. They have a blackish-brown body, with irregularly distributed black markings.

== Subspecies ==
- Serica karafutoensis karafutoensis (Japan, Russia Far East)
- Serica karafutoensis honshuensis Nomura, 1972 (Japan)
