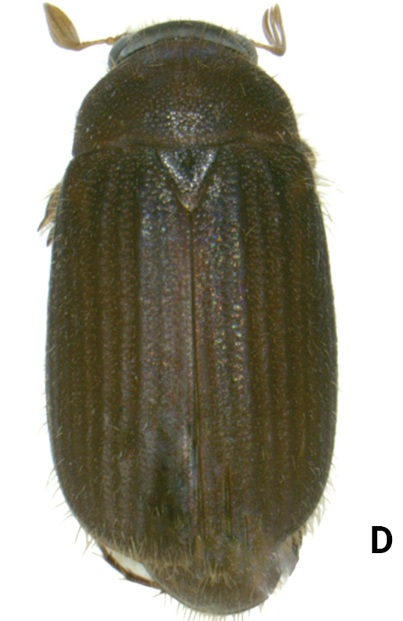

Scientific classification
- Kingdom: Animalia
- Phylum: Arthropoda
- Class: Insecta
- Order: Coleoptera
- Suborder: Polyphaga
- Infraorder: Scarabaeiformia
- Family: Scarabaeidae
- Genus: Serica
- Species: S. breviantennalis

Binomial name
- Serica breviantennalis Liu, Ahrens, Li & Su, 2023

= Serica breviantennalis =

Species of beetle

Serica breviantennalis is a species of beetle of the family Scarabaeidae. It is found in China (Yunnan).

== Description ==
Adults reach a length of about 7.5–8.2 mm. They have a reddish brown, oblong body. The frons is dark reddish brown and dull. The legs are yellowish brown and the antennae are yellow. There are moderately long setae on the head dorsal surface.

== Etymology ==
The species name is derived from Latin brevis (meaning short) and antennalis (meaning antenna) and refers to the short antenna.
