= Serica sinuosa =

Scientific classification
- Kingdom: Animalia
- Phylum: Arthropoda
- Class: Insecta
- Order: Coleoptera
- Suborder: Polyphaga
- Infraorder: Scarabaeiformia
- Family: Scarabaeidae
- Genus: Serica
- Species: S. sinuosa

Binomial name
- Serica sinuosa (Kobayashi & Yu, 2000)

Synonyms
- Taiwanoserica sinuosa Kobayashi & Yu, 2000

Species of beetle

Serica sinuosa is a species of beetle of the family Scarabaeidae. It is found in Taiwan.

== Description ==
Adults reach a length of about 7.8–8.5 mm. They have a light to medium reddish brown, elongate oval body. The clypeus, tibiae and tarsi are reddish brown, the frons and vertex blackish brown and the antennae yellowish brown. The dorsal surface is mottled with blackish patches. The surface of the body is opaque, with the clypeus, antennae and legs shining.

== Etymology ==
The species name refers to its sinuate middle femur.
