= Serica assingi =

Scientific classification
- Kingdom: Animalia
- Phylum: Arthropoda
- Class: Insecta
- Order: Coleoptera
- Suborder: Polyphaga
- Infraorder: Scarabaeiformia
- Family: Scarabaeidae
- Genus: Serica
- Species: S. assingi

Binomial name
- Serica assingi Ahrens, Zhao, Pham & Liu, 2024

Species of beetle

Serica assingi is a species of beetle of the family Scarabaeidae. It is found in China (Gansu).

== Description ==
Adults reach a length of about 8 mm. They have a reddish brown, oblong body, with the head and pronotum darker. The antennae and legs are yellowish brown and there are large, dark spots on the elytra. The dorsal surface is dull and mostly glabrous (except for the head and lateral margins of the pronotum and elytra). The elytra have sparse, moderately long, white setae.

== Etymology ==
The species name refers to the collector of the species, Volker Assing.
