= Serica serensia =

Scientific classification
- Kingdom: Animalia
- Phylum: Arthropoda
- Class: Insecta
- Order: Coleoptera
- Suborder: Polyphaga
- Infraorder: Scarabaeiformia
- Family: Scarabaeidae
- Genus: Serica
- Species: S. serensia

Binomial name
- Serica serensia Saylor, 1948

Species of beetle

Serica serensia is a species of beetle of the family Scarabaeidae. It is found in Mexico (Baja California).

== Description ==
Adults reach a length of about 10 mm. They have a castaneo-rufous, robust, pruinose-opaque body. The head and thorax are rich velvety brown and the front of the head is very sparsely punctate and faintly shining.
