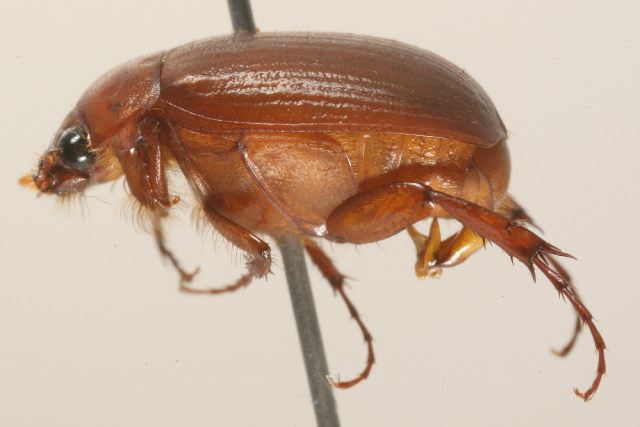

Scientific classification
- Kingdom: Animalia
- Phylum: Arthropoda
- Class: Insecta
- Order: Coleoptera
- Suborder: Polyphaga
- Infraorder: Scarabaeiformia
- Family: Scarabaeidae
- Genus: Serica
- Species: S. concinna

Binomial name
- Serica concinna Dawson, 1947

= Serica concinna =

Species of beetle

Serica concinna is a species of beetle of the family Scarabaeidae. It is found in the United States (Arizona, Colorado).

== Description ==
Adults reach a length of about 8 mm. The colour is auburn brown (varying from light to dark). The surface is polished and shining. The margins of the pronotum and elytra are fimbriate with light, coarse hairs.
