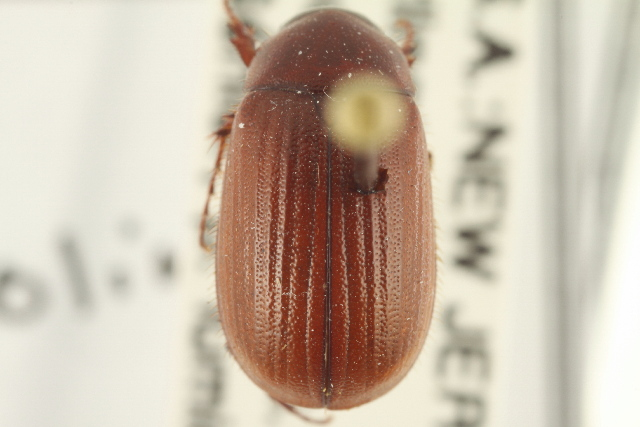

Scientific classification
- Kingdom: Animalia
- Phylum: Arthropoda
- Class: Insecta
- Order: Coleoptera
- Suborder: Polyphaga
- Infraorder: Scarabaeiformia
- Family: Scarabaeidae
- Genus: Serica
- Species: S. carolina

Binomial name
- Serica carolina Dawson, 1920

= Serica carolina =

Species of beetle

Serica carolina is a species of beetle of the family Scarabaeidae. It is found in the coastal United States from New York to Alabama, Maryland, North Carolina and South Carolina.

== Description ==
Adults reach a length of about 7.5–8 mm. The colour varies from Sanford's brown to chestnut. The surface is bare, polished and shining.
