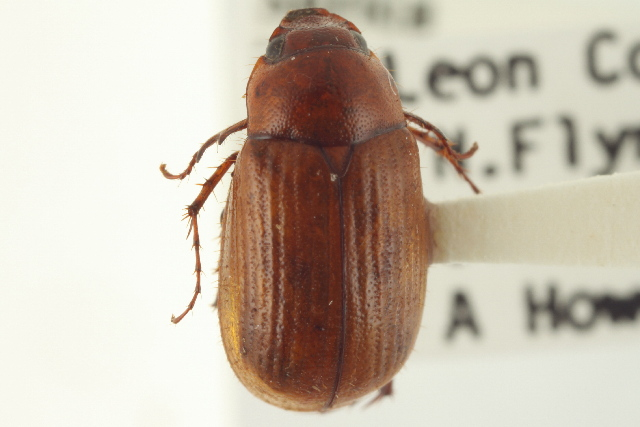

Scientific classification
- Kingdom: Animalia
- Phylum: Arthropoda
- Class: Insecta
- Order: Coleoptera
- Suborder: Polyphaga
- Infraorder: Scarabaeiformia
- Family: Scarabaeidae
- Genus: Serica
- Species: S. texana

Binomial name
- Serica texana LeConte, 1856

= Serica texana =

Species of beetle

Serica texana is a species of scarab beetle in the family Scarabaeidae. It is found in North America (Texas).
