= Serica elongatula =

Scientific classification
- Kingdom: Animalia
- Phylum: Arthropoda
- Class: Insecta
- Order: Coleoptera
- Suborder: Polyphaga
- Infraorder: Scarabaeiformia
- Family: Scarabaeidae
- Genus: Serica
- Species: S. elongatula

Binomial name
- Serica elongatula Horn, 1870

Species of beetle

Serica elongatula is a species of beetle of the family Scarabaeidae. It is found in the United States (California).

== Description ==
Adults reach a length of about 6.5 mm. The colour is bay to chestnut. The surface is subopaque and faintly sericeous.
