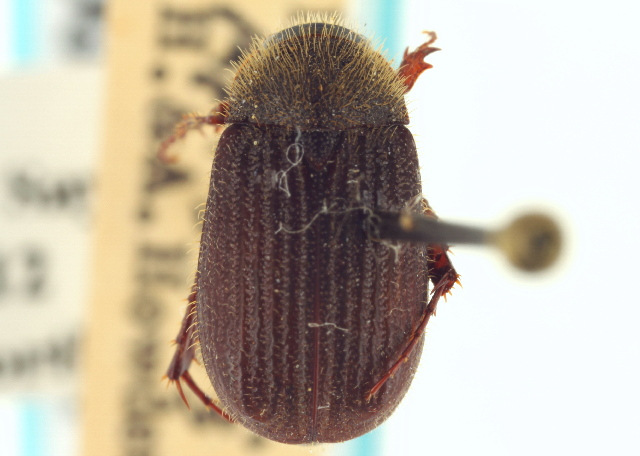

Scientific classification
- Kingdom: Animalia
- Phylum: Arthropoda
- Clade: Pancrustacea
- Class: Insecta
- Order: Coleoptera
- Suborder: Polyphaga
- Infraorder: Scarabaeiformia
- Family: Scarabaeidae
- Genus: Serica
- Species: S. iricolor

Binomial name
- Serica iricolor (Say, 1824)

Synonyms
- Melolontha iricolor Say, 1824

= Serica iricolor =

Species of beetle

Serica iricolor is a species of scarab beetle in the family Scarabaeidae. It is found in North America, where it has been recorded from Florida, Georgia, Maryland, Massachusetts, New Hamsphire, New Jersey, New York, North Carolina, Ohio, Pennsylvania, Rhode Island, Tennessee and Virginia.

== Description ==
They have a dark colour and are iridescent. There are dense, erect, rusty, hairs on the pronotum.
