= Serica pangwa =

Scientific classification
- Kingdom: Animalia
- Phylum: Arthropoda
- Class: Insecta
- Order: Coleoptera
- Suborder: Polyphaga
- Infraorder: Scarabaeiformia
- Family: Scarabaeidae
- Genus: Serica
- Species: S. pangwa

Binomial name
- Serica pangwa Ahrens, Fabrizi & Liu, 2022

Species of beetle

Serica pangwa is a species of beetle of the family Scarabaeidae. It is found in Myanmar.

== Description ==
Adults reach a length of about 7.9–8 mm. They have a yellowish brown, elongate eggshaped body. The head, pronotum, and scutellum are dark brown. The dorsal surface, except for the dull frons, is shiny, partly with a greenish shine. The elytra have dark brown spots and the antennae are yellow. The dorsal surface is almost glabrous, except for dense short erect setae on the anterior pronotal disc and head.

== Etymology ==
The species is named after its type locality, Pangwa.
