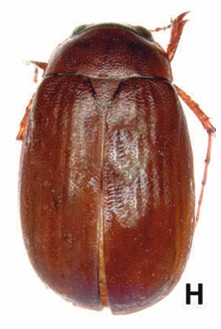

Scientific classification
- Kingdom: Animalia
- Phylum: Arthropoda
- Class: Insecta
- Order: Coleoptera
- Suborder: Polyphaga
- Infraorder: Scarabaeiformia
- Family: Scarabaeidae
- Genus: Serica
- Species: S. fashengi

Binomial name
- Serica fashengi Liu & Ahrens, 2014

= Serica fashengi =

Species of beetle

Serica fashengi is a species of beetle of the family Scarabaeidae. It is found in China (Xizang).

== Description ==
Adults reach a length of about 9.2–10 mm. They have an oblong-oval body. Their body, including legs, is dark reddish brown and dull, while the antennae are yellowish brown. The dorsal surface is nearly glabrous, with the head and pronotum moderately shiny.

== Etymology ==
The species is named after the collector of the species, Li Fasheng.
