= Serica klapperichi =

Scientific classification
- Kingdom: Animalia
- Phylum: Arthropoda
- Class: Insecta
- Order: Coleoptera
- Suborder: Polyphaga
- Infraorder: Scarabaeiformia
- Family: Scarabaeidae
- Genus: Serica
- Species: S. klapperichi

Binomial name
- Serica klapperichi (Frey, 1972)

Synonyms
- Trichoserica klapperichi Frey, 1972

Species of beetle

Serica klapperichi is a species of beetle of the family Scarabaeidae. It is found in China (Fujian, Guangdong, Guangxi).

== Description ==
Adults reach a length of about 7.4 mm. They have an oval body. The dorsal surface is light reddish-brown and dull, the elytra partly with an iridescent shine. The head is shiny, with dense, erect, moderately long setae and the antennae are yellow.
