= Serica angustatotibialis =

Scientific classification
- Kingdom: Animalia
- Phylum: Arthropoda
- Class: Insecta
- Order: Coleoptera
- Suborder: Polyphaga
- Infraorder: Scarabaeiformia
- Family: Scarabaeidae
- Genus: Serica
- Species: S. angustatotibialis

Binomial name
- Serica angustatotibialis Ahrens, 1999

Species of beetle

Serica angustatotibialis is a species of beetle of the family Scarabaeidae. It is found in India (Sikkim) and the southern face of the Himalaya in southern Tibet between Sikkim and Bhutan.

== Description ==
Adults reach a length of about 9.5-9.8 mm. They have a chestnut brown, elongate body. The upper surface is mostly dull and there are single, erect hairs on the forehead, pronotum and elytra.
