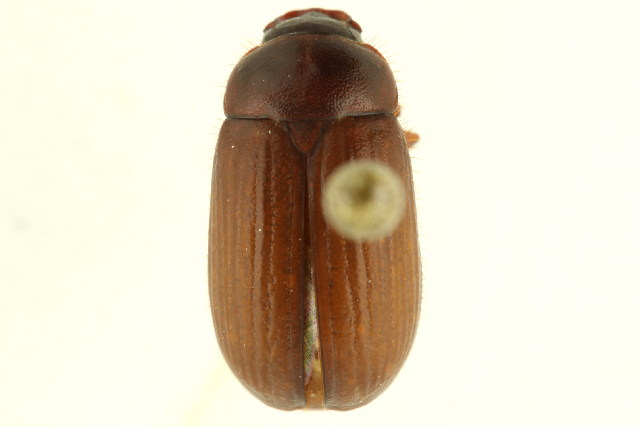

Scientific classification
- Kingdom: Animalia
- Phylum: Arthropoda
- Class: Insecta
- Order: Coleoptera
- Suborder: Polyphaga
- Infraorder: Scarabaeiformia
- Family: Scarabaeidae
- Genus: Serica
- Species: S. curvata

Binomial name
- Serica curvata LeConte, 1856

= Serica curvata =

Species of beetle

Serica curvata is a species of beetle of the family Scarabaeidae. It is found in the United States (California, Colorado, Idaho, Kansas, Montana, Nebraska, Nevada, North Dakota, Oregon, Utah, Washington) and Canada (Alberta, British Columbia, Manitoba, Northwest Territory, Saskatchewan).

== Description ==
Adults reach a length of about 7–10 mm. The colour varies from amber brown to a very dark auburn. The surface is somewhat shining, but not polished, and sometimes shows distinct traces of a sericeous, metallic luster.
