= Serica dissimillima =

Scientific classification
- Kingdom: Animalia
- Phylum: Arthropoda
- Class: Insecta
- Order: Coleoptera
- Suborder: Polyphaga
- Infraorder: Scarabaeiformia
- Family: Scarabaeidae
- Genus: Serica
- Species: S. dissimillima

Binomial name
- Serica dissimillima Ahrens, Fabrizi & Liu, 2022

Species of beetle

Serica dissimillima is a species of beetle of the family Scarabaeidae. It is found in China (Guangdong, Guangxi).

== Description ==
Adults reach a length of about 9.5–10.9 mm. They have a dark brown, dull, elongate body. The legs are reddish brown, the elytra yellowish brown with dark spots and the antennae are yellow. The dorsal surface is almost glabrous, except for single and short, white setae on the pronotum and elytra.

== Etymology ==
The species name is derived from Latin dissimile (meaning dissimilar) and refers to the dissimilar aedeagus morphology.
