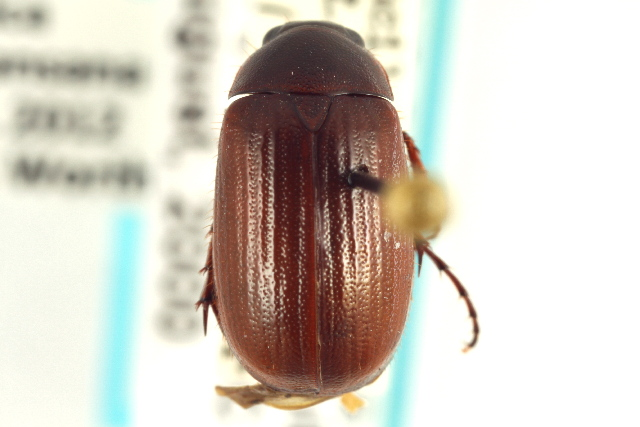

Scientific classification
- Kingdom: Animalia
- Phylum: Arthropoda
- Class: Insecta
- Order: Coleoptera
- Suborder: Polyphaga
- Infraorder: Scarabaeiformia
- Family: Scarabaeidae
- Genus: Serica
- Species: S. arkansana

Binomial name
- Serica arkansana Dawson, 1947

= Serica arkansana =

Species of beetle

Serica arkansana is a species of beetle of the family Scarabaeidae. It is found in the United States (Arkansas).

== Description ==
Adults reach a length of about 8 mm. The colour is chestnut brown, and the surface is glabrous and shining.
