= Serica craighead =

Scientific classification
- Kingdom: Animalia
- Phylum: Arthropoda
- Class: Insecta
- Order: Coleoptera
- Suborder: Polyphaga
- Infraorder: Scarabaeiformia
- Family: Scarabaeidae
- Genus: Serica
- Species: S. craighead

Binomial name
- Serica craighead Saylor, 1939

Species of beetle

Serica craighead is a species of beetle of the family Scarabaeidae. It is found in the United States (California) and Mexico (Baja California).

== Description ==
Adults reach a length of about 7.5–7.8 mm. There are testaceo-castaneous, the head with traces of piceous. The dorsal surface is moderately shining and faintly iridescent.
