= Serica chengtuensis =

Scientific classification
- Kingdom: Animalia
- Phylum: Arthropoda
- Class: Insecta
- Order: Coleoptera
- Suborder: Polyphaga
- Infraorder: Scarabaeiformia
- Family: Scarabaeidae
- Genus: Serica
- Species: S. chengtuensis

Binomial name
- Serica chengtuensis Ahrens, 2009

Species of beetle

Serica chengtuensis is a species of beetle of the family Scarabaeidae. It is found in China (Shaanxi, Sichuan).

== Description ==
Adults reach a length of about 8–9 mm. They have a reddish brown, oblong body. The antennae and elytra are yellow with dark spots. The dorsal surface is dull and, except for a few fine hairs on the head and elytra, almost glabrous.

== Etymology ==
The species name refers to its occurrence close to the town Chengtu.
