= Serica excisa =

Scientific classification
- Kingdom: Animalia
- Phylum: Arthropoda
- Class: Insecta
- Order: Coleoptera
- Suborder: Polyphaga
- Infraorder: Scarabaeiformia
- Family: Scarabaeidae
- Genus: Serica
- Species: S. excisa

Binomial name
- Serica excisa (Frey, 1972)

Synonyms
- Trichoserica excisa Frey, 1972

Species of beetle

Serica excisa is a species of beetle of the family Scarabaeidae. It is found in China (Fujian, Sichuan).

== Description ==
Adults reach a length of about 6.2 mm. They have an oval body. The dorsal surface is yellow and shiny, while the head and ventral surface are dark brown and shiny, with dense, moderately long setae. The antennae are yellow.
