= Serica taythien =

Scientific classification
- Kingdom: Animalia
- Phylum: Arthropoda
- Class: Insecta
- Order: Coleoptera
- Suborder: Polyphaga
- Infraorder: Scarabaeiformia
- Family: Scarabaeidae
- Genus: Serica
- Species: S. taythien

Binomial name
- Serica taythien Ahrens, Zhao, Pham & Liu, 2024

Species of beetle

Serica taythien is a species of beetle of the family Scarabaeidae. It is found in Vietnam.

== Description ==
Adults reach a length of about 8.8–9.9 mm. They have a dark brown, oval and strongly convex body. The head, pronotum and some spots on the elytra have a greenish shine. The elytra have darker spots and the antennae are yellow. The dorsal surface is weakly shiny or iridescent, with moderately dense, short, narrow, curved, white setae.

== Etymology ==
The species name is derived from its type locality, Tay Thien.
