= Serica assequens =

Scientific classification
- Kingdom: Animalia
- Phylum: Arthropoda
- Class: Insecta
- Order: Coleoptera
- Suborder: Polyphaga
- Infraorder: Scarabaeiformia
- Family: Scarabaeidae
- Genus: Serica
- Species: S. assequens

Binomial name
- Serica assequens Ahrens & Fabrizi, 2009

Species of beetle

Serica assequens is a species of beetle of the family Scarabaeidae. It is found in India (western Arunachal Pradesh).

== Description ==
Adults reach a length of about 7.9-8.3 mm. They have a dark brown, oblong body. The antennae are yellowish and the legs and elytra are reddisch brown, the latter with indistinct dark spots. The dorsal surface is dull, the frons, pronotal disc and elytra with some long erect setae.

== Etymology ==
The name of the species is derived from Latin assequens (meaning subsequent).
