= Serica septentrionalis =

Scientific classification
- Kingdom: Animalia
- Phylum: Arthropoda
- Class: Insecta
- Order: Coleoptera
- Suborder: Polyphaga
- Infraorder: Scarabaeiformia
- Family: Scarabaeidae
- Genus: Serica
- Species: S. septentrionalis

Binomial name
- Serica septentrionalis Murayama, 1935

Species of beetle

Serica septentrionalis is a species of beetle of the family Scarabaeidae. It is found in North Korea.

== Description ==
Adults reach a length of about 7–8 mm. They have a blackish brown to yellowish brown, short oval body, which is partially covered with fine, dense setae.
