= Serica jaegeri =

Scientific classification
- Kingdom: Animalia
- Phylum: Arthropoda
- Class: Insecta
- Order: Coleoptera
- Suborder: Polyphaga
- Infraorder: Scarabaeiformia
- Family: Scarabaeidae
- Genus: Serica
- Species: S. jaegeri

Binomial name
- Serica jaegeri Ahrens, 1999

Species of beetle

Serica jaegeri is a species of beetle of the family Scarabaeidae. It is found in central Nepal.

== Description ==
Adults reach a length of about 7.3-9.2 mm. They have a dark brown, elongate-oval body. The legs, margins of the pronotum and ventral surface are reddish-brown and the antennae are yellowish-brown. The upper surface is mostly dull.

== Etymology ==
The species is named after a colleague of the author, Olaf Jager.
