= Serica formosana =

Scientific classification
- Kingdom: Animalia
- Phylum: Arthropoda
- Clade: Pancrustacea
- Class: Insecta
- Order: Coleoptera
- Suborder: Polyphaga
- Infraorder: Scarabaeiformia
- Family: Scarabaeidae
- Genus: Serica
- Species: S. formosana

Binomial name
- Serica formosana Moser, 1915

Synonyms
- Maladera brevipilosa Kobayashi, 1985; Maladera curvifemora Nomura, 1974

Species of beetle

Serica formosana is a species of beetle of the family Scarabaeidae. It is found in Taiwan.

== Description ==
Adults reach a length of about 8 mm. They are blackish-brown, but somewhat lighter on the underside. The frons is sparsely punctate, with some setae. The antennae are yellowish-brown. The pronotum has a densely punctate surface, and the punctures have tiny setae. The lateral margins are setate. The elytra are irregularly punctate in the striae and the weakly convex intervals have extensive punctation. A narrow median stripe on the intervals is unpunctate towards the sides of the elytra. The punctures have tiny setae, and some longer setae are found next to the lateral margins of the elytra.
