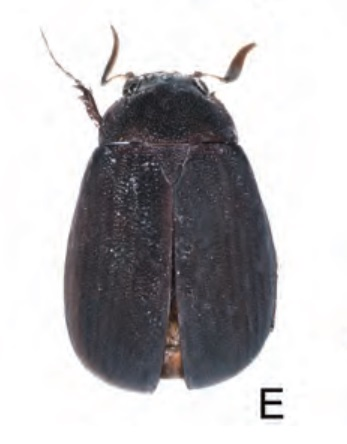

Scientific classification
- Kingdom: Animalia
- Phylum: Arthropoda
- Class: Insecta
- Order: Coleoptera
- Suborder: Polyphaga
- Infraorder: Scarabaeiformia
- Family: Scarabaeidae
- Genus: Serica
- Species: S. feresegregata

Binomial name
- Serica feresegregata Ahrens & Fabrizi, 2016

= Serica feresegregata =

Species of beetle

Serica feresegregata is a species of beetle of the family Scarabaeidae. It is found in India (Arunachal Pradesh).

== Description ==
Adults reach a length of about 8.8–9.6 mm. They have a dark brown, oval body, with yellowish brown antennae and reddish brown legs. The dorsal surface is dull, but the dorsal face of the pronotum and elytra is glabrous.

== Etymology ==
The species name is derived from Latin fere- (meaning nearly) and the species name segregata, and refers to the similarity to Serica segregata.
