= Serica monticola =

Scientific classification
- Kingdom: Animalia
- Phylum: Arthropoda
- Class: Insecta
- Order: Coleoptera
- Suborder: Polyphaga
- Infraorder: Scarabaeiformia
- Family: Scarabaeidae
- Genus: Serica
- Species: S. monticola

Binomial name
- Serica monticola (Kobayashi & Yu, 2000)

Synonyms
- Taiwanoserica monticola Kobayashi & Yu, 2000

Species of beetle

Serica monticola is a species of beetle of the family Scarabaeidae. It is found in Taiwan.

== Description ==
Adults reach a length of about 7.8–8.2 mm. They have a dark reddish brown to blackish brown, elongate oval body, with the legs reddish brown, the clypeus and posterior part of the head blackish brown and the antennae yellowish-brown. The dorsal surface is mottled with blackish patches, and the sides of the metasternum and abdomen are blackish brown or dark. The surface of the body is opaque, with the clypeus, antennae and legs shining.

== Etymology ==
The species name refers to its occurrence in the Central Mountain Range of Taiwan.
