= Serica subnisa =

Scientific classification
- Kingdom: Animalia
- Phylum: Arthropoda
- Class: Insecta
- Order: Coleoptera
- Suborder: Polyphaga
- Infraorder: Scarabaeiformia
- Family: Scarabaeidae
- Genus: Serica
- Species: S. subnisa

Binomial name
- Serica subnisa Dawson, 1947

Species of beetle

Serica subnisa is a species of beetle of the family Scarabaeidae. It is found in the United States (California).

== Description ==
Adults reach a length of about 8 mm. The colour is brown (chestnut to bay) with a distinct rainbow iridescence on the elytra. The striae on the elytra have a few minute, pale hairs, and the margins of the elytra and pronotum are moderately fimbriate.
