= Serica limbourgi =

Scientific classification
- Kingdom: Animalia
- Phylum: Arthropoda
- Class: Insecta
- Order: Coleoptera
- Suborder: Polyphaga
- Infraorder: Scarabaeiformia
- Family: Scarabaeidae
- Genus: Serica
- Species: S. limbourgi

Binomial name
- Serica limbourgi Ahrens, Fabrizi & Liu, 2022

Species of beetle

Serica limbourgi is a species of beetle of the family Scarabaeidae. It is found in Vietnam.

== Description ==
Adults reach a length of about 8.9–10.4 mm. They have a dark brown, iridescent and moderately shiny, oval body. The ventral surface and legs are reddish brown, while the elytra are yellow brown with numerous dark spots. The antennae are yellow. The dorsal surface is almost glabrous, except for some short, pale setae on the pronotum and elytra.

== Etymology ==
The species is named after one of its collectors, Poul Limbourg.
