= Serica opaciclypealis =

Scientific classification
- Kingdom: Animalia
- Phylum: Arthropoda
- Class: Insecta
- Order: Coleoptera
- Suborder: Polyphaga
- Infraorder: Scarabaeiformia
- Family: Scarabaeidae
- Genus: Serica
- Species: S. opaciclypealis

Binomial name
- Serica opaciclypealis Ahrens, 1999

Species of beetle

Serica opaciclypealis is a species of beetle of the family Scarabaeidae. It is found in India (Sikkim) and Nepal.

== Description ==
Adults reach a length of about 7.4–9.1 mm. They have a dark brown, elongate-oval body, partly with a greenish sheen. The legs and antennae are reddish-brown. The upper surface is nearly glabrous.
