= Serica zhangyaonani =

Scientific classification
- Kingdom: Animalia
- Phylum: Arthropoda
- Class: Insecta
- Order: Coleoptera
- Suborder: Polyphaga
- Infraorder: Scarabaeiformia
- Family: Scarabaeidae
- Genus: Serica
- Species: S. zhangyaonani

Binomial name
- Serica zhangyaonani Zhao & Ahrens, 2023

Species of beetle

Serica zhangyaonani is a species of beetle of the family Scarabaeidae. It is found in China (Xizang).

== Description ==
Adults reach a length of about 11.5–12 mm. They have a dull, greenish brown, ovoid body. The elytra are paler and have an irregular, dark pattern. The antennae are yellowish brown, while the legs are reddish brown.

== Etymology ==
The species is dedicated to Mr. Yao-Nan Zhang, who collected the species.
