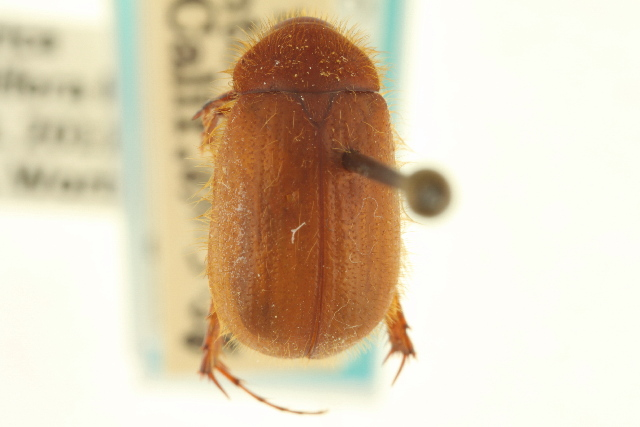

Scientific classification
- Kingdom: Animalia
- Phylum: Arthropoda
- Class: Insecta
- Order: Coleoptera
- Suborder: Polyphaga
- Infraorder: Scarabaeiformia
- Family: Scarabaeidae
- Genus: Serica
- Species: S. pilifera

Binomial name
- Serica pilifera Horn, 1894

= Serica pilifera =

Species of beetle

Serica pilifera is a species of beetle of the family Scarabaeidae. It is found in Mexico (Baja California).

== Description ==
Adults reach a length of about 8 mm. They have a pale brown, dull surface, with semi-erect fulvous hairs. The hairs on the elytra are vaguely arranged in rows.
