= Serica cuona =

Scientific classification
- Kingdom: Animalia
- Phylum: Arthropoda
- Class: Insecta
- Order: Coleoptera
- Suborder: Polyphaga
- Infraorder: Scarabaeiformia
- Family: Scarabaeidae
- Genus: Serica
- Species: S. cuona

Binomial name
- Serica cuona Ahrens, Zhao, Pham & Liu, 2024

Species of beetle

Serica cuona is a species of beetle of the family Scarabaeidae. It is found in China (Xizang).

== Description ==
Adults reach a length of about 7.5 mm. They have a yellowish brown, oblong body. The frons, disc of the pronotum and abdomen are dark brown and the legs and antennae are yellow. There are dense, small dark spots on the elytra. The dorsal surface is shiny and almost glabrous.

== Etymology ==
The species is named after its type locality, Cuona.
