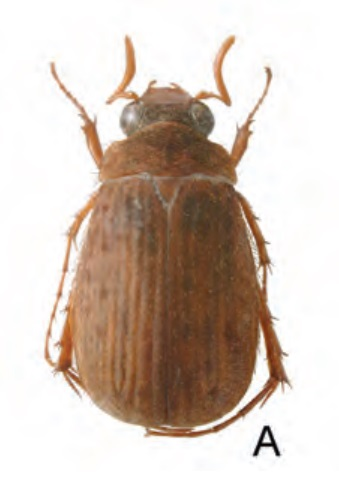

Scientific classification
- Kingdom: Animalia
- Phylum: Arthropoda
- Clade: Pancrustacea
- Class: Insecta
- Order: Coleoptera
- Suborder: Polyphaga
- Infraorder: Scarabaeiformia
- Family: Scarabaeidae
- Genus: Serica
- Species: S. khasiana

Binomial name
- Serica khasiana (Moser, 1918)

Synonyms
- Ophthalmoserica khasiana Moser, 1918; Trichoserica khasiana

= Serica khasiana =

Species of beetle

Serica khasiana is a species of beetle of the family Scarabaeidae. It is found in the western Himalaya, east towards central Nepal.

== Description ==
Adults reach a length of about 8.7-10.5 mm. They have a dark chestnut brown, elongate-oval body, with the legs, margins of the pronotum and ventral surface somewhat lighter. The antennae are yellowish-brown. The upper surface is mostly dull and has a few erect white hairs.
