= Serica yangzaichuni =

Scientific classification
- Kingdom: Animalia
- Phylum: Arthropoda
- Class: Insecta
- Order: Coleoptera
- Suborder: Polyphaga
- Infraorder: Scarabaeiformia
- Family: Scarabaeidae
- Genus: Serica
- Species: S. yangzaichuni

Binomial name
- Serica yangzaichuni Zhao & Ahrens, 2023

Species of beetle

Serica yangzaichuni is a species of beetle of the family Scarabaeidae. It is found in China (Guizhou).

== Description ==
Adults reach a length of about 7.8–8.2 mm. They have a yellowish brown, elongated ovoid body. The head is smooth, while the pronotum and scutellum are weakly dull and iridescent, with an irregular green pattern. The legs are reddish brown, while the antennae are yellowish brown.

== Etymology ==
The species is dedicated to Dr. Zai-Chun Yang, who kindly the first authors during a survey on Mount Leigongshan.
