= Serica coalinga =

Scientific classification
- Kingdom: Animalia
- Phylum: Arthropoda
- Class: Insecta
- Order: Coleoptera
- Suborder: Polyphaga
- Infraorder: Scarabaeiformia
- Family: Scarabaeidae
- Genus: Serica
- Species: S. coalinga

Binomial name
- Serica coalinga Dawson, 1952

Species of beetle

Serica coalinga is a species of beetle of the family Scarabaeidae. It is found in the United States (California).

== Description ==
Adults reach a length of about 9 mm. The colour is light reddish brown, the elytra with a feeble greyish bloom and conspicuous, bristling, fulvous hairs, mostly following the line-like striae. The margins and ventral surface of the body have conspicuous, fulvous hairs.
