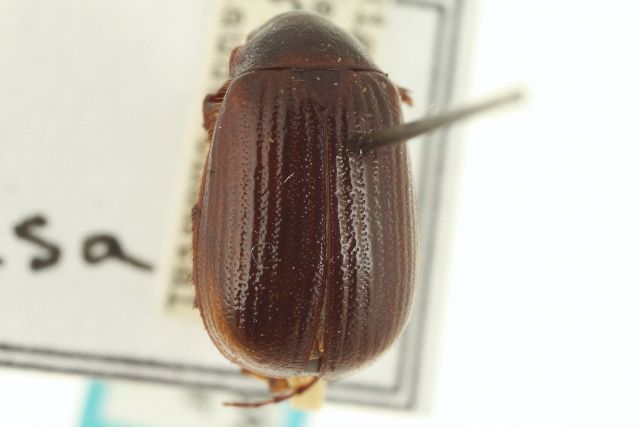

Scientific classification
- Kingdom: Animalia
- Phylum: Arthropoda
- Class: Insecta
- Order: Coleoptera
- Suborder: Polyphaga
- Infraorder: Scarabaeiformia
- Family: Scarabaeidae
- Genus: Serica
- Species: S. elusa

Binomial name
- Serica elusa Dawson, 1919

= Serica elusa =

Species of beetle

Serica elusa is a species of beetle of the family Scarabaeidae. It is found in Canada (Ontario, Quebec) and the United States (New Hampshire, New York).

== Description ==
Adults reach a length of about 10 mm. The colour is chestnut-brown. The upper surface is bare, polished and shining, without any trace of sericeous or pruinose luster.
