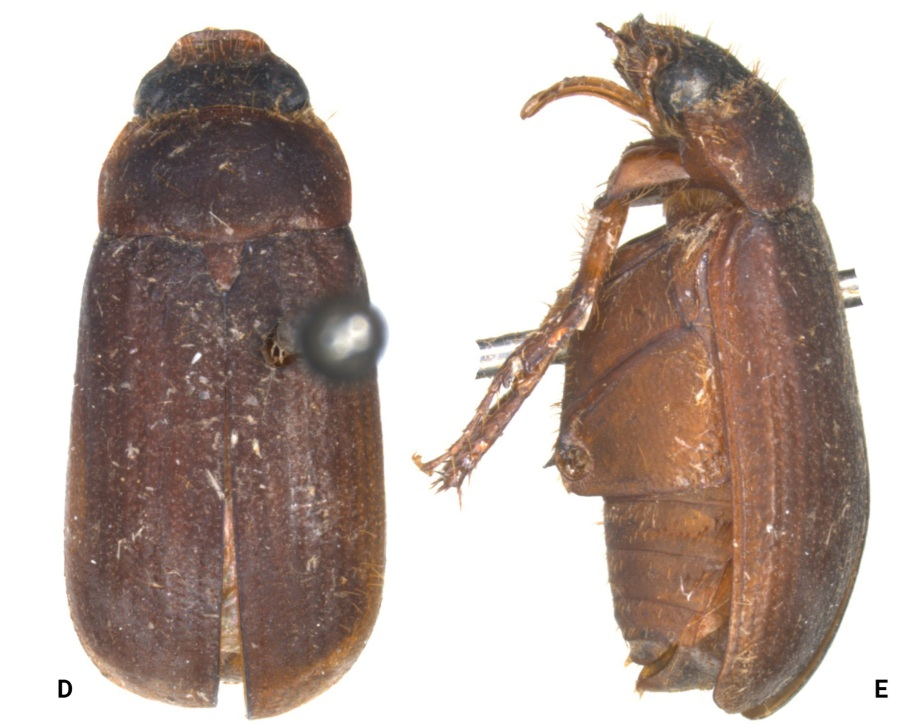

Scientific classification
- Kingdom: Animalia
- Phylum: Arthropoda
- Clade: Pancrustacea
- Class: Insecta
- Order: Coleoptera
- Suborder: Polyphaga
- Infraorder: Scarabaeiformia
- Family: Scarabaeidae
- Genus: Serica
- Species: S. fengensis

Binomial name
- Serica fengensis Liu, Ahrens, Li & Su, 2023

= Serica fengensis =

Species of beetle

Serica fengensis is a species of beetle of the family Scarabaeidae. It is found in China (Shaanxi).

== Description ==
Adults reach a length of about 6.8–8.4 mm. They have a dark brown, narrow, oblong body. The ventral surface, legs, and labroclypeus are reddish brown and the antennae are yellow. There are moderately dense, long setae on the dorsal surface.

== Etymology ==
The species name is derived from the location of the type locality in Feng County.
