= Serica chuttana =

Scientific classification
- Kingdom: Animalia
- Phylum: Arthropoda
- Class: Insecta
- Order: Coleoptera
- Suborder: Polyphaga
- Infraorder: Scarabaeiformia
- Family: Scarabaeidae
- Genus: Serica
- Species: S. chuttana

Binomial name
- Serica chuttana Ahrens, 1999

Species of beetle

Serica chuttana is a species of beetle of the family Scarabaeidae. It is found in western Nepal.

== Description ==
Adults reach a length of about 9.2 mm. They have a reddish-brown, elongate body. The upper surface is mostly dull and there are numerous moderately long, erect, yellow hairs on the pronotum and elytra.
