= Serica narya =

Scientific classification
- Kingdom: Animalia
- Phylum: Arthropoda
- Class: Insecta
- Order: Coleoptera
- Suborder: Polyphaga
- Infraorder: Scarabaeiformia
- Family: Scarabaeidae
- Genus: Serica
- Species: S. narya

Binomial name
- Serica narya Ahrens, 1999

Species of beetle

Serica narya is a species of beetle of the family Scarabaeidae. It is found in India (Sikkim).

== Description ==
Adults reach a length of about 9.6–9.8 mm. They have a light reddish-brown, elongate-oval body. There are numerous small dark spots on the elytra. The upper surface is mostly dull (partly with a metallic green sheen) and nearly glabrous.
