= Serica khajiaris =

Scientific classification
- Kingdom: Animalia
- Phylum: Arthropoda
- Class: Insecta
- Order: Coleoptera
- Suborder: Polyphaga
- Infraorder: Scarabaeiformia
- Family: Scarabaeidae
- Genus: Serica
- Species: S. khajiaris

Binomial name
- Serica khajiaris Mittal, 1988

Species of beetle

Serica khajiaris is a species of beetle of the family Scarabaeidae. It is found in Bhutan, China (Xizang), India (Arunachal Pradesh, Jammu and Kashmir, Sikkim, Uttarakhand), Nepal and Pakistan.

== Description ==
Adults reach a length of about 8.2–10.8 mm. They have a dark chestnut brown, elongate-oval body, with the legs and margins of the pronotum somewhat lighter. The antennae are yellowish-brown. The upper surface is mostly dull and has a few erect white hairs.
