= Serica pseudogracilipes =

Scientific classification
- Kingdom: Animalia
- Phylum: Arthropoda
- Class: Insecta
- Order: Coleoptera
- Suborder: Polyphaga
- Infraorder: Scarabaeiformia
- Family: Scarabaeidae
- Genus: Serica
- Species: S. pseudogracilipes

Binomial name
- Serica pseudogracilipes Ahrens, Fabrizi & Liu, 2022

Species of beetle

Serica pseudogracilipes is a species of beetle of the family Scarabaeidae. It is found in Taiwan.

== Description ==
Adults reach a length of about 9–9.5 mm. They have a dark brown, dull, elongate body. The elytra are yellowish-brown with dark brown to reddish brown spots, the antennae are yellow and the base and margins of the pronotum are lighter. The dorsal surface is almost glabrous, except for some short, white setae on the elytra.

== Etymology ==
The species name is derived from Greek pseudo and the species name gracilipes and refers to the similarity to Serica gracilipes.
