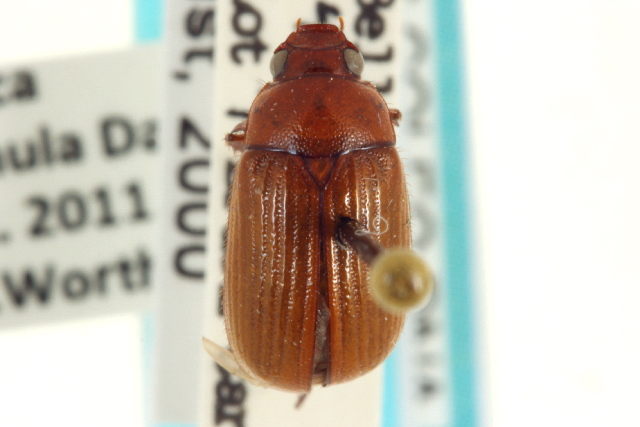

Scientific classification
- Kingdom: Animalia
- Phylum: Arthropoda
- Class: Insecta
- Order: Coleoptera
- Suborder: Polyphaga
- Infraorder: Scarabaeiformia
- Family: Scarabaeidae
- Genus: Serica
- Species: S. aemula

Binomial name
- Serica aemula Dawson, 1947

= Serica aemula =

Species of beetle

Serica aemula is a species of scarab beetle in the family Scarabaeidae. It is found in North America (Texas).

== Description ==
Adults reach a length of about 8 mm. Adults closely resemble Serica contorta, bu the puncturation is coarser and denser than in contorta and the anterior reflexed margin is evenly arcuate (instead of subangulate medially as in contorta).
