= Serica allotengchongana =

Scientific classification
- Kingdom: Animalia
- Phylum: Arthropoda
- Class: Insecta
- Order: Coleoptera
- Suborder: Polyphaga
- Infraorder: Scarabaeiformia
- Family: Scarabaeidae
- Genus: Serica
- Species: S. allotengchongana

Binomial name
- Serica allotengchongana Ahrens, Fabrizi & Liu, 2022

Species of beetle

Serica allotengchongana is a species of beetle of the family Scarabaeidae. It is found in China (Yunnan).

== Description ==
Adults reach a length of about 9.2 mm. They have a dark brown, elongate eggshaped body, partly with a greenish shine. The elytra have dark spots, the antennae are yellowish and the legs are brown. The dorsal surface is dull and densely covered with short yellow setae.

== Etymology ==
The species name is derived from Greek allo (meaning other) and the species name tengchongensis and refers to the similarity to Serica tengchongana.
