= Serica nigromaculosa =

Scientific classification
- Kingdom: Animalia
- Phylum: Arthropoda
- Class: Insecta
- Order: Coleoptera
- Suborder: Polyphaga
- Infraorder: Scarabaeiformia
- Family: Scarabaeidae
- Genus: Serica
- Species: S. nigromaculosa

Binomial name
- Serica nigromaculosa Fairmaire, 1891

Species of beetle

Serica nigromaculosa is a species of beetle of the family Scarabaeidae. It is found in China (Henan, Shaanxi, Sichuan, Zhejiang).

== Description ==
Adults reach a length of about 10 mm. They are similar to Serica nigroguttata as indicated by the light white pubescence and the spotted elytra. However, nigroguttata is smaller, the head is not shiny (only the anterior part of the clypeus is) and the head is also not coarsely punctate, the suture line is not impressed and the pygidium is not longitudinally impressed in the middle.
