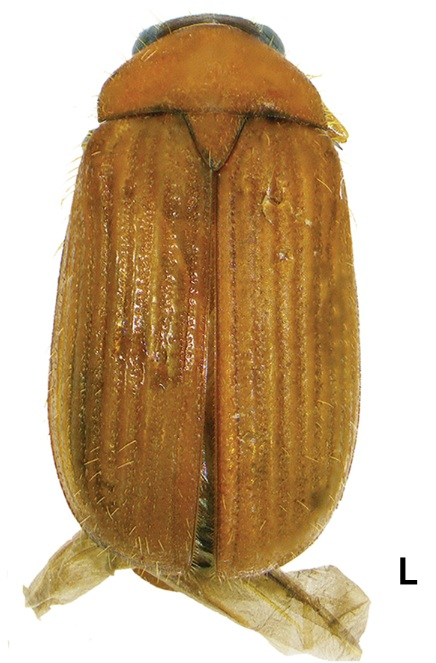

Scientific classification
- Kingdom: Animalia
- Phylum: Arthropoda
- Class: Insecta
- Order: Coleoptera
- Suborder: Polyphaga
- Infraorder: Scarabaeiformia
- Family: Scarabaeidae
- Genus: Serica
- Species: S. allonanhua

Binomial name
- Serica allonanhua Liu, Ahrens, Li & Su, 2023

= Serica allonanhua =

Species of beetle

Serica allonanhua is a species of beetle of the family Scarabaeidae. It is found in China (Yunnan).

== Description ==
Adults reach a length of about 7.8–7.6 mm. They have a light reddish brown, oblong body. The frons is reddish brown, and some lateral and basal parts of the elytral intervals are dark reddish brown and dull. The legs are yellowish brown and the antennae are yellow. There are moderately long setae on the dorsal surface.

== Etymology ==
The species name is derived from Greek allo (meaning different or other) and nanhua and refers to the similarity of the species to Serica nanhua.
