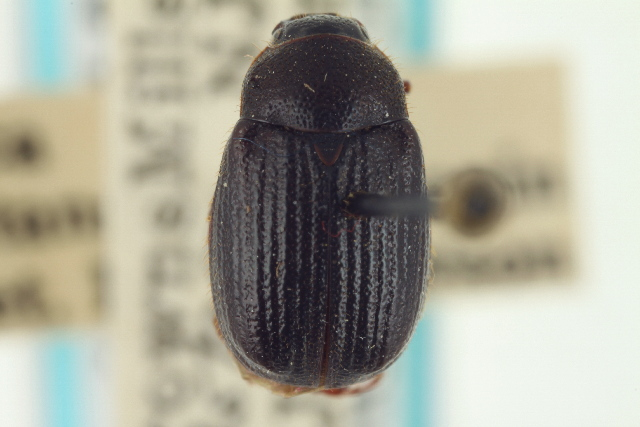

Scientific classification
- Kingdom: Animalia
- Phylum: Arthropoda
- Class: Insecta
- Order: Coleoptera
- Suborder: Polyphaga
- Infraorder: Scarabaeiformia
- Family: Scarabaeidae
- Genus: Serica
- Species: S. imitans

Binomial name
- Serica imitans Chapin, 1931

Synonyms
- Omaloplia trogiformis Uhler, 1855

= Serica imitans =

Species of beetle

Serica imitans is a species of beetle of the family Scarabaeidae. It is found in the United States (Indiana, Maryland, New Jersey).

== Description ==
Adults reach a length of about 5.7 mm. Adults are identical to Serica trociformis in form, size and coloration, but the upper parts are very distinctly hairy and the pronotum is without a distinct median longitudinal groove.
