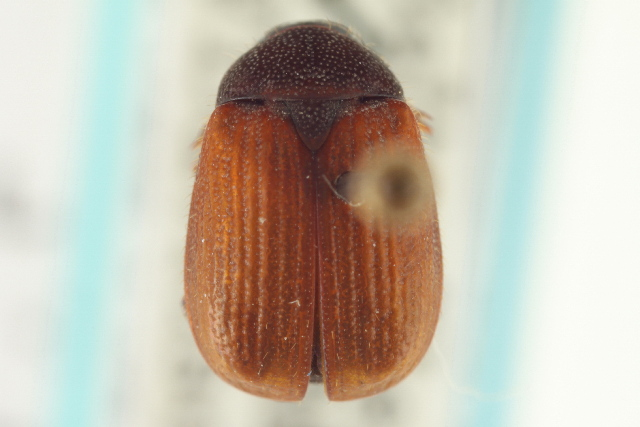

Scientific classification
- Kingdom: Animalia
- Phylum: Arthropoda
- Class: Insecta
- Order: Coleoptera
- Suborder: Polyphaga
- Infraorder: Scarabaeiformia
- Family: Scarabaeidae
- Genus: Serica
- Species: S. blatchleyi

Binomial name
- Serica blatchleyi Dawson, 1932

Synonyms
- Serica trociformis blatchleyi Dawson, 1932

= Serica blatchleyi =

Species of beetle

Serica blatchleyi is a species of scarab beetle in the family Scarabaeidae. It is found in North America (Connecticut, Indiana, Kentucky, Maryland, Massachusetts, Missouri, New Jersey, New York, North Carolina, Pennsylvania, Rhode Island, Tennessee, Virginia).

== Description ==
Adults are very similar to Serica trociformis, but differs from that species by the possession of a median groove on the pronotum, which usually expands into a distinct sub-basal impression.
