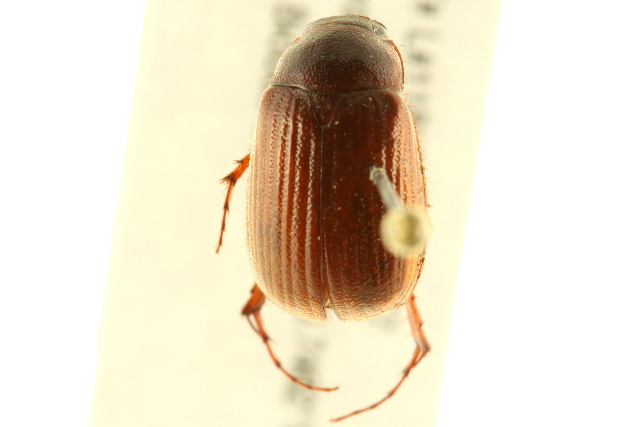

Scientific classification
- Kingdom: Animalia
- Phylum: Arthropoda
- Class: Insecta
- Order: Coleoptera
- Suborder: Polyphaga
- Infraorder: Scarabaeiformia
- Family: Scarabaeidae
- Genus: Serica
- Species: S. opposita

Binomial name
- Serica opposita Dawson, 1921

= Serica opposita =

Species of beetle

Serica opposita is a species of scarab beetle in the family Scarabaeidae. It is found in the United States (Maryland to Georgia, west to Michigan and Missouri, New Jersey, South Carolina).

== Description ==
Adults reach a length of about 8 mm. Adults are very similar to Serica spicula, but slightly larger.
