= Serica carbonaria =

Scientific classification
- Kingdom: Animalia
- Phylum: Arthropoda
- Class: Insecta
- Order: Coleoptera
- Suborder: Polyphaga
- Infraorder: Scarabaeiformia
- Family: Scarabaeidae
- Genus: Serica
- Species: S. carbonaria

Binomial name
- Serica carbonaria Fairmaire, 1898

Species of beetle

Serica carbonaria is a species of beetle of the family Scarabaeidae. It is found in Madagascar.

== Description ==
Adults reach a length of about 5.5 mm. They have an ovate, very convex, dark-pitchy, opaque body. The pronotum and elytra have yellow cilia and sparse tiny white setae.
