= Serica psammobuna =

Scientific classification
- Kingdom: Animalia
- Phylum: Arthropoda
- Class: Insecta
- Order: Coleoptera
- Suborder: Polyphaga
- Infraorder: Scarabaeiformia
- Family: Scarabaeidae
- Genus: Serica
- Species: S. psammobuna

Binomial name
- Serica psammobuna Hardy, 1987

Synonyms
- Serica psammobunus

Species of beetle

Serica psammobuna is a species of beetle of the family Scarabaeidae. It is found in the United States (Nevada).

== Description ==
Adults reach a length of about 8-8.5 mm. The colour ranges from black to dark brown. The head, thorax, elytra, abdomen and legs are black. The clypeus is shining, while the front and vertex are pruinose. Both the front and clypeus have a few scattered erect hairs. There are also scattered, pale, short, erect hairs on the elytra.

== Etymology ==
The species name is derived from Greek psammo (meaning sand) and bounos (meaning hill) and refers to the localities of collection of the type material (Sand Mountain and Blow Sand Mountain).
