= Serica rossi =

Scientific classification
- Kingdom: Animalia
- Phylum: Arthropoda
- Class: Insecta
- Order: Coleoptera
- Suborder: Polyphaga
- Infraorder: Scarabaeiformia
- Family: Scarabaeidae
- Genus: Serica
- Species: S. rossi

Binomial name
- Serica rossi Saylor, 1948

Species of beetle

Serica rossi is a species of beetle of the family Scarabaeidae. It is found in Mexico (Baja California).

== Description ==
Adults reach a length of about 8.5–9.5 mm. The surface is shining and the elytra are faintly pruinose. The colour is rufo-testaceons, with the head and thorax more rufous.
