= Serica guangnanensis =

Scientific classification
- Kingdom: Animalia
- Phylum: Arthropoda
- Class: Insecta
- Order: Coleoptera
- Suborder: Polyphaga
- Infraorder: Scarabaeiformia
- Family: Scarabaeidae
- Genus: Serica
- Species: S. guangnanensis

Binomial name
- Serica guangnanensis Ahrens, Fabrizi & Liu, 2022

Species of beetle

Serica guangnanensis is a species of beetle of the family Scarabaeidae. It is found in China (Yunnan).

== Description ==
Adults reach a length of about 8.4 mm. They have a dark brown, dull, oblong body. The legs are brown and the antennae are yellow. There are numerous short and long setae on the dorsal surface.

== Etymology ==
The species name is derived from its type locality, Guangnan.
