= Serica babaoshanensis =

Scientific classification
- Kingdom: Animalia
- Phylum: Arthropoda
- Class: Insecta
- Order: Coleoptera
- Suborder: Polyphaga
- Infraorder: Scarabaeiformia
- Family: Scarabaeidae
- Genus: Serica
- Species: S. babaoshanensis

Binomial name
- Serica babaoshanensis Zhao & Ahrens, 2023

Species of beetle

Serica babaoshanensis is a species of beetle of the family Scarabaeidae. It is found in China (Fujian, Guangdong, Guangxi).

== Description ==
Adults reach a length of about 7.7–8.5 mm. They have a dark brown, ovoid body. The labroclypeus and legs are reddish brown, while the antennae are yellowish brown.

== Etymology ==
The species name is derived from its type locality, Babaoshan Preserve Station in Nanling Nature Reserve.
