= Serica mureensis =

Scientific classification
- Kingdom: Animalia
- Phylum: Arthropoda
- Class: Insecta
- Order: Coleoptera
- Suborder: Polyphaga
- Infraorder: Scarabaeiformia
- Family: Scarabaeidae
- Genus: Serica
- Species: S. mureensis

Binomial name
- Serica mureensis Ahrens, 1999

Species of beetle

Serica mureensis is a species of beetle of the family Scarabaeidae. It is found in Nepal and India (Sikkim).

== Description ==
Adults reach a length of about 7.6–8.5 mm. They have a dark brown, elongate body, with lighter spots on the elytra. The legs are reddish-brown and the antennae are yellowish. The upper surface is mostly dull and has some single, long or short, erect hairs.
