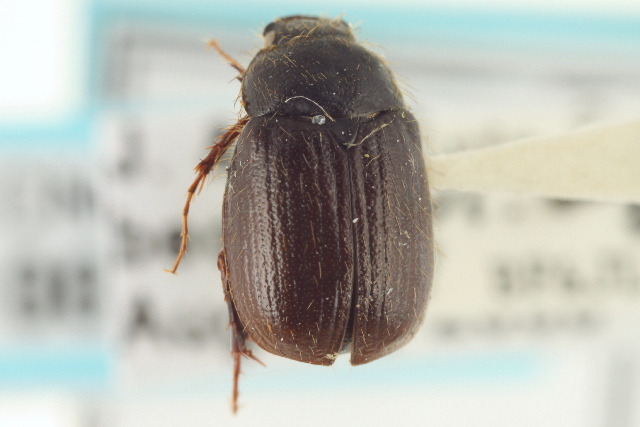

Scientific classification
- Kingdom: Animalia
- Phylum: Arthropoda
- Class: Insecta
- Order: Coleoptera
- Suborder: Polyphaga
- Infraorder: Scarabaeiformia
- Family: Scarabaeidae
- Genus: Serica
- Species: S. bruneri

Binomial name
- Serica bruneri Dawson, 1967

Synonyms
- Serica brunneri

= Serica bruneri =

Species of beetle

Serica bruneri is a species of beetle of the family Scarabaeidae. It is found in the United States (Colorado).

== Description ==
Adults reach a length of about 5–7 mm. The colour is dark brown to nearly black. There are sparse, shaggy, semi-erect, light brown hairs on the upper surface.
