= Serica hirsuta =

Scientific classification
- Kingdom: Animalia
- Phylum: Arthropoda
- Class: Insecta
- Order: Coleoptera
- Suborder: Polyphaga
- Infraorder: Scarabaeiformia
- Family: Scarabaeidae
- Genus: Serica
- Species: S. hirsuta

Binomial name
- Serica hirsuta Kim & Kim, 2003

Species of beetle

Serica hirsuta is a species of beetle of the family Scarabaeidae. It is found in South Korea.

== Description ==
Adults reach a length of about 7.3–9.8 mm. They have a shiny, light yellowish to dark brown, elongate oval body.
