= Serica nhiae =

Scientific classification
- Kingdom: Animalia
- Phylum: Arthropoda
- Class: Insecta
- Order: Coleoptera
- Suborder: Polyphaga
- Infraorder: Scarabaeiformia
- Family: Scarabaeidae
- Genus: Serica
- Species: S. nhiae

Binomial name
- Serica nhiae Ahrens, Zhao, Pham & Liu, 2024

Species of beetle

Serica nhiae is a species of beetle of the family Scarabaeidae. It is found in Vietnam.

== Description ==
Adults reach a length of about 10.6 mm. They have a dark reddish brown, elongate, eggshaped body, partly with greenish toment. The elytra have dark spots, and the even intervals are almost completely dark. The antennae are yellowish and the legs are brown. The dorsal surface is dull and densely covered with short yellow setae.

== Etymology ==
The species is named after Dr. Nhi Thi Pham.
