= Serica micans =

Scientific classification
- Kingdom: Animalia
- Phylum: Arthropoda
- Class: Insecta
- Order: Coleoptera
- Suborder: Polyphaga
- Infraorder: Scarabaeiformia
- Family: Scarabaeidae
- Genus: Serica
- Species: S. micans

Binomial name
- Serica micans (Fabricius, 1801)

Synonyms
- Melolontha micans Fabricius, 1801; Melolontha radiata Schönherr, 1817

Species of beetle

Serica micans is a species of beetle of the family Scarabaeidae. It is found in Indonesia (the Mollucas).

== Description ==
The elytra are striated, dark and shimmering with cyan and gold. The head and thorax are red and immaculate.
