= Serica bihluhensis =

Scientific classification
- Kingdom: Animalia
- Phylum: Arthropoda
- Class: Insecta
- Order: Coleoptera
- Suborder: Polyphaga
- Infraorder: Scarabaeiformia
- Family: Scarabaeidae
- Genus: Serica
- Species: S. bihluhensis

Binomial name
- Serica bihluhensis (Kobayashi & Yu, 2000)

Synonyms
- Taiwanoserica bihluhensis Kobayashi & Yu, 2000

Species of beetle

Serica bihluhensis is a species of beetle of the family Scarabaeidae. It is found in Taiwan.

== Description ==
Adults reach a length of about 10 mm. They have a reddish brown to dark reddish brown, elongate oval body, with the clypeus, tibiae and tarsi reddish brown, the posterior part of the head blackish brown, the antennae yellowish brown and the dorsal surface mottled with black patches. The surface of the body is opaque, with the clypeus, antennae and legs shining.

== Etymology ==
The species is named bihluhensis after one of the places it was captured.
