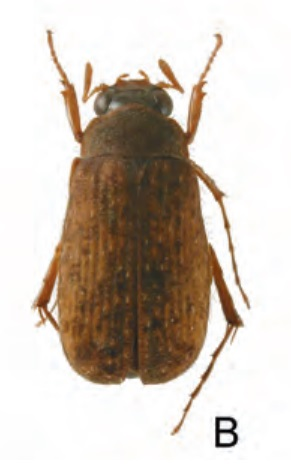

Scientific classification
- Kingdom: Animalia
- Phylum: Arthropoda
- Class: Insecta
- Order: Coleoptera
- Suborder: Polyphaga
- Infraorder: Scarabaeiformia
- Family: Scarabaeidae
- Genus: Serica
- Species: S. eberti

Binomial name
- Serica eberti (Frey, 1965)

Synonyms
- Ophthalmoserica eberti Frey, 1965

= Serica eberti =

Species of beetle

Serica eberti is a species of beetle of the family Scarabaeidae. It is found from the Kumaon Himalaya to eastern-central Nepal and in Bhutan. It is absent from eastern Nepal and the Sikkim/Darjeeling area.

== Description ==
Adults reach a length of about 6.2-7.5 mm. They have a dark brown, elongate body. The ventral surface and the legs are reddish-brown, while the antennae are yellowish. The upper surface is mostly dull, except for the shiny head.
