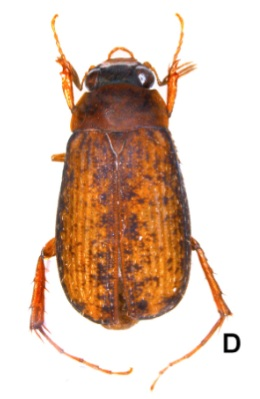

Scientific classification
- Kingdom: Animalia
- Phylum: Arthropoda
- Class: Insecta
- Order: Coleoptera
- Suborder: Polyphaga
- Infraorder: Scarabaeiformia
- Family: Scarabaeidae
- Genus: Serica
- Species: S. eberlei

Binomial name
- Serica eberlei Sreedevi, Ranasinghe, Fabrizi & Ahrens, 2019

= Serica eberlei =

Species of beetle

Serica eberlei is a species of beetle of the family Scarabaeidae. It is found in China (Xizang) and India (Arunachal Pradesh).

== Description ==
Adults reach a length of about 8.8 mm. They have a dark brown, oblong body, with yellowish antennae and legs. Wide parts on the elytra and pronotal lateral margins are reddish brown. The dorsal surface is dull. The frons, pronotum and elytra have sparse, erect setae.

== Etymology ==
The species is dedicated to Dr. Jonas Eberle.
