= Serica bomi =

Scientific classification
- Kingdom: Animalia
- Phylum: Arthropoda
- Class: Insecta
- Order: Coleoptera
- Suborder: Polyphaga
- Infraorder: Scarabaeiformia
- Family: Scarabaeidae
- Genus: Serica
- Species: S. bomi

Binomial name
- Serica bomi Ahrens, Zhao, Pham & Liu, 2024

Species of beetle

Serica bomi is a species of beetle of the family Scarabaeidae. It is found in China (Xizang).

== Description ==
Adults reach a length of about 7.5–9.2 mm. They have a dark brown, oblong body. The antennae are yellow, while the legs, margins of the pronotum and parts of the ventral surface are reddish brown. There are indistinct, large, slightly darker spots on the elytra. The dorsal surface is dull and glabrous, except for sparse setae on the elytra.

== Etymology ==
The species name refers to its type locality, Tomi.
