= Serica semicincta =

Scientific classification
- Kingdom: Animalia
- Phylum: Arthropoda
- Class: Insecta
- Order: Coleoptera
- Suborder: Polyphaga
- Infraorder: Scarabaeiformia
- Family: Scarabaeidae
- Genus: Serica
- Species: S. semicincta

Binomial name
- Serica semicincta (Walker, 1859)

Synonyms
- Omaloplia semicincta Walker, 1859

Species of beetle

Serica semicincta is a species of beetle of the family Scarabaeidae. It is found in Sri Lanka.

== Description ==
They are testaceous and shiny, with a green, finely punctate head and thorax. The head and margin of the thorax have testaceous scales. The lines on the elytra are roughly punctate, and the basal spot and sutural margin are green.
