= Serica hamifera =

Scientific classification
- Kingdom: Animalia
- Phylum: Arthropoda
- Class: Insecta
- Order: Coleoptera
- Suborder: Polyphaga
- Infraorder: Scarabaeiformia
- Family: Scarabaeidae
- Genus: Serica
- Species: S. hamifera

Binomial name
- Serica hamifera (Walker, 1859)

Synonyms
- Omaloplia hamifera Walker, 1859

Species of beetle

Serica hamifera is a species of beetle of the family Scarabaeidae. It is found in Sri Lanka.

== Description ==
They are testaceous and shiny, with a densely punctate green head.
