= Serica pilumna =

Scientific classification
- Kingdom: Animalia
- Phylum: Arthropoda
- Class: Insecta
- Order: Coleoptera
- Suborder: Polyphaga
- Infraorder: Scarabaeiformia
- Family: Scarabaeidae
- Genus: Serica
- Species: S. pilumna

Binomial name
- Serica pilumna Ahrens & Fabrizi, 2009

Species of beetle

Serica pilumna is a species of beetle of the family Scarabaeidae. It is endemic to western Arunachal Pradesh.

== Description ==
Adults reach a length of about 10.4 mm. They have a dark brown, oblong body. The antennae are yellowish and the legs, elytral striae and borders of the pronotum are reddish brown, the elytra with dark spots. The dorsal surface is dull and densely covered with erect setae.

== Etymology ==
The species name is derived from Latin pilumnus (meaning setose) and refers to the densely setose surface.
