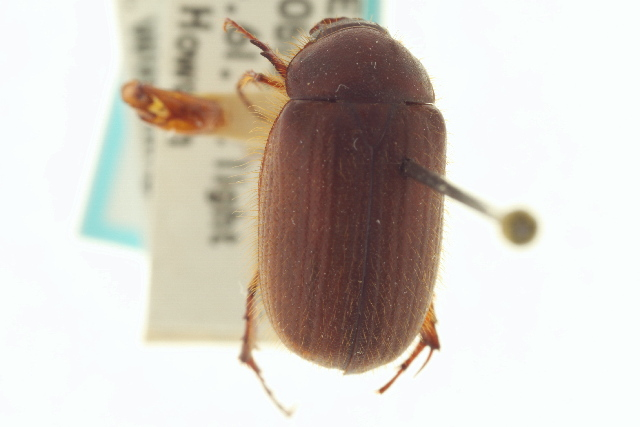

Scientific classification
- Kingdom: Animalia
- Phylum: Arthropoda
- Class: Insecta
- Order: Coleoptera
- Suborder: Polyphaga
- Infraorder: Scarabaeiformia
- Family: Scarabaeidae
- Genus: Serica
- Species: S. ventura

Binomial name
- Serica ventura Dawson, 1932

Synonyms
- Serica personata Dawson, 1932

= Serica ventura =

Species of beetle

Serica ventura is a species of beetle of the family Scarabaeidae. It is found in the United States (California).

== Description ==
Adults reach a length of about 9 mm. The colour is a light to middle shade of reddish brown. The colour of the pronotum is burnt sienna and the elytra are dulled to hazel by a greyish bloom.

== Subspecies ==
- Serica ventura ventura (California)
- Serica ventura dorsalis Dawson, 1952 (California)
- Serica ventura personata Dawson, 1932 (California)
