= Serica behluddinensis =

Scientific classification
- Kingdom: Animalia
- Phylum: Arthropoda
- Class: Insecta
- Order: Coleoptera
- Suborder: Polyphaga
- Infraorder: Scarabaeiformia
- Family: Scarabaeidae
- Genus: Serica
- Species: S. behluddinensis

Binomial name
- Serica behluddinensis Ahrens, 2005

Species of beetle

Serica behluddinensis is a species of beetle of the family Scarabaeidae. It is found in China (Sichuan).
