= Serica solivaga =

Scientific classification
- Kingdom: Animalia
- Phylum: Arthropoda
- Class: Insecta
- Order: Coleoptera
- Suborder: Polyphaga
- Infraorder: Scarabaeiformia
- Family: Scarabaeidae
- Genus: Serica
- Species: S. solivaga

Binomial name
- Serica solivaga Brenske, 1899

Species of beetle

Serica solivaga is a species of beetle of the family Scarabaeidae. It is found in China (Yunnan) and Myanmar.

== Description ==
Adults reach a length of about 8.5 mm. They have a dark brown, dull, oblong body. The legs are brown and the antennae are yellow. The dorsal surface is almost glabrous.
