= Serica kitulgalana =

Scientific classification
- Kingdom: Animalia
- Phylum: Arthropoda
- Class: Insecta
- Order: Coleoptera
- Suborder: Polyphaga
- Infraorder: Scarabaeiformia
- Family: Scarabaeidae
- Genus: Serica
- Species: S. kitulgalana

Binomial name
- Serica kitulgalana Fabrizi & Ahrens, 2014

Species of beetle

Serica kitulgalana is a species of beetle of the family Scarabaeidae. It is found in Sri Lanka.

== Description ==
Adults reach a length of about 4.5-4.6 mm. They have a reddish brown, moderately oblong, suboval body, with the antennae and legs also reddish brown. The head and pronotum have a strong green metallic shine, while this shine is weak on the elytra. There are four dark spots on the pronotum. The dorsal surface is dull and minutely setose.

== Etymology ==
The species is named after its type locality, Kitulgala.
