= Serica ramosa =

Scientific classification
- Kingdom: Animalia
- Phylum: Arthropoda
- Class: Insecta
- Order: Coleoptera
- Suborder: Polyphaga
- Infraorder: Scarabaeiformia
- Family: Scarabaeidae
- Genus: Serica
- Species: S. ramosa

Binomial name
- Serica ramosa Ahrens, 1999

Species of beetle

Serica ramosa is a species of beetle of the family Scarabaeidae. It is found in Nepal and India (Uttarakhand).

== Description ==
Adults reach a length of about 7–9.1 mm. They have a reddish-brown, elongate-oval body, with the forehead darker and the margins of the pronotum darker. The antennae are yellowish. The upper surface is mostly dull and has a few isolated hairs.
