= Serica lurida =

Scientific classification
- Kingdom: Animalia
- Phylum: Arthropoda
- Class: Insecta
- Order: Coleoptera
- Suborder: Polyphaga
- Infraorder: Scarabaeiformia
- Family: Scarabaeidae
- Genus: Serica
- Species: S. lurida

Binomial name
- Serica lurida Brenske, 1898

Synonyms
- Serica maculifera Brenske, 1898 (nec Brenske, 1894); Serica rubescens Arrow, 1916

Species of beetle

Serica lurida is a species of beetle of the family Scarabaeidae. It is found in Sri Lanka.

== Description ==
Adults reach a length of about 5.5 mm. They have a reddish brown, oblong, suboval body, with the antennae and legs also reddish brown. The head and pronotum have a strong green metallic shine, while this shine is weak on the elytra. The dorsal surface is dull and nearly glabrous.
