= Serica humboldti =

Scientific classification
- Kingdom: Animalia
- Phylum: Arthropoda
- Class: Insecta
- Order: Coleoptera
- Suborder: Polyphaga
- Infraorder: Scarabaeiformia
- Family: Scarabaeidae
- Genus: Serica
- Species: S. humboldti

Binomial name
- Serica humboldti Gordon, 1975

Species of beetle

Serica humboldti is a species of beetle of the family Scarabaeidae. It is found in the United States (Nevada).

== Description ==
Adults reach a length of about 6.7–8.1 mm. They are dull brown, with a pruinose sheen dorsally. The frons is shiny reddish brown and the ventral surface is shiny yellowish brown.
