= Serica fansipan =

Scientific classification
- Kingdom: Animalia
- Phylum: Arthropoda
- Class: Insecta
- Order: Coleoptera
- Suborder: Polyphaga
- Infraorder: Scarabaeiformia
- Family: Scarabaeidae
- Genus: Serica
- Species: S. fansipan

Binomial name
- Serica fansipan Ahrens, Zhao, Pham & Liu, 2024

Species of beetle

Serica fansipan is a species of beetle of the family Scarabaeidae. It is found in Vietnam.

== Description ==
Adults reach a length of about 8.8 mm. They have a reddish brown, oblong body, with the head and disc of the pronotum darker. The antennae and legs are yellowish to reddish brown and there are indistinct large, dark spots on the elytra. The dorsal surface is dull and mostly glabrous (except for the head and lateral margins of the pronotum and elytra). The elytra have sparse, moderately long, white setae.

== Etymology ==
The species name refers to its type locality, the Fansipan Mountain.
