= Serica maculosa =

Scientific classification
- Kingdom: Animalia
- Phylum: Arthropoda
- Clade: Pancrustacea
- Class: Insecta
- Order: Coleoptera
- Suborder: Polyphaga
- Infraorder: Scarabaeiformia
- Family: Scarabaeidae
- Genus: Serica
- Species: S. maculosa

Binomial name
- Serica maculosa Moser, 1915

Species of beetle

Serica maculosa is a species of beetle of the family Scarabaeidae. It is found in China (Guangxi, Shandong).

== Description ==
Adults reach a length of about 8.6–10.4 mm. They have a dark reddish-brown, partially shimmering dark green, elongate-oval body. The antennae and legs are brown. The surface is entirely dull or iridescent, except for the shiny labroclypeus. The upper surface has dense, fine, white scale-like hairs as well as individual, erect, long, white scale-like setae.
