= Serica ammomenisco =

Scientific classification
- Kingdom: Animalia
- Phylum: Arthropoda
- Class: Insecta
- Order: Coleoptera
- Suborder: Polyphaga
- Infraorder: Scarabaeiformia
- Family: Scarabaeidae
- Genus: Serica
- Species: S. ammomenisco

Binomial name
- Serica ammomenisco Hardy, 1987

Species of beetle

Serica ammomenisco is a species of beetle of the family Scarabaeidae. It is found in the United States (Nevada).

== Description ==
Adults reach a length of about 7.6 mm. The colour ranges from pale brown to brownish black. The head and thorax are black, while the elytra and legs are dark brown. The front and clypeus have scattered erect hairs.

== Etymology ==
The species name is derived from Greek ammo (meaning sand) and menisco (meaning crescent) and refers to the type locality, Crescent Dune.
