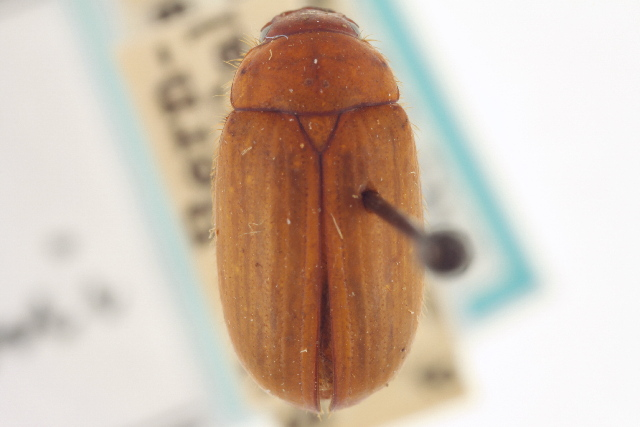

Scientific classification
- Kingdom: Animalia
- Phylum: Arthropoda
- Class: Insecta
- Order: Coleoptera
- Suborder: Polyphaga
- Infraorder: Scarabaeiformia
- Family: Scarabaeidae
- Genus: Serica
- Species: S. pavonia

Binomial name
- Serica pavonia Dawson, 1932

= Serica pavonia =

Species of beetle

Serica pavonia is a species of beetle of the family Scarabaeidae. It is found in the United States (California).

== Description ==
Adults reach a length of about 8 mm. The colour is light brown to testaceous (hazel to russet), the elytra with a rainbow iridescence.
