= Serica werneri =

Scientific classification
- Kingdom: Animalia
- Phylum: Arthropoda
- Class: Insecta
- Order: Coleoptera
- Suborder: Polyphaga
- Infraorder: Scarabaeiformia
- Family: Scarabaeidae
- Genus: Serica
- Species: S. werneri

Binomial name
- Serica werneri Ahrens, 2007

Species of beetle

Serica werneri is a species of beetle of the family Scarabaeidae. It is found in Laos.

== Description ==
Adults reach a length of about 7.7 mm. They have a dark reddish-brown, partially shimmering dark green, elongate-oval body. The antennae and legs are yellowish-brown. The surface is entirely dull, except for the shiny labroclypeus. The upper surface has moderately dense, fine, almost uniformly arranged, white scale-like hairs and individual, erect, long, white setae.

== Etymology ==
The species is named after Karl Werner.
