= Serica aviceps =

Scientific classification
- Kingdom: Animalia
- Phylum: Arthropoda
- Class: Insecta
- Order: Coleoptera
- Suborder: Polyphaga
- Infraorder: Scarabaeiformia
- Family: Scarabaeidae
- Genus: Serica
- Species: S. aviceps

Binomial name
- Serica aviceps Dawson, 1967

Species of beetle

Serica aviceps is a species of beetle of the family Scarabaeidae. It is found in the United States (California).

== Description ==
Adults reach a length of about 9 mm. The colour varies a little between the middle shades of dull brown, faintly shining, not pruinose or dusted, with only a faint trace of iridescence. The surface is finely, evenly and densely punctured.
