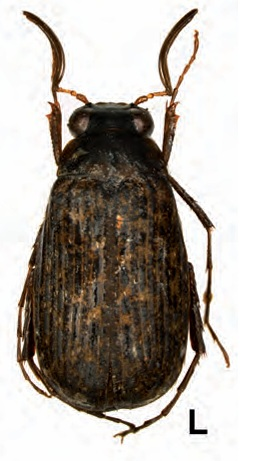

Scientific classification
- Kingdom: Animalia
- Phylum: Arthropoda
- Class: Insecta
- Order: Coleoptera
- Suborder: Polyphaga
- Infraorder: Scarabaeiformia
- Family: Scarabaeidae
- Genus: Serica
- Species: S. panwarensis

Binomial name
- Serica panwarensis Ahrens & Fabrizi, 2011

= Serica panwarensis =

Species of beetle

Serica panwarensis is a species of beetle of the family Scarabaeidae. It is found in Myanmar.

== Description ==
Adults reach a length of about 8.3 mm. They have an dark brown, oblong body. The antennae are brown and the tarsi and pronotal margins are reddish brown, the elytra with indistinct irregular dark spots. The dorsal surface is dull and almost glabrous.

== Etymology ==
The species is named after the village in the vicinity of the type locality, Panwar.
