= Serica jirii =

Scientific classification
- Kingdom: Animalia
- Phylum: Arthropoda
- Class: Insecta
- Order: Coleoptera
- Suborder: Polyphaga
- Infraorder: Scarabaeiformia
- Family: Scarabaeidae
- Genus: Serica
- Species: S. jirii

Binomial name
- Serica jirii Ahrens, Fabrizi & Liu, 2022

Species of beetle

Serica jirii is a species of beetle of the family Scarabaeidae. It is found in China (Yunnan) and Myanmar.

== Description ==
Adults reach a length of about 8–8.6 mm. They have a dark brown, elongate eggshaped body, partly with a greenish shine. The elytra are partly yellowish brown with dark brown spots, while the antennae and ventral surface are yellowish. The dorsal surface is dull and almost glabrous, except for a few single short setae on the pronotum and elytra.

== Etymology ==
The species is named after one of its collectors, Jiří Hájek.
