= Serica hongyii =

Scientific classification
- Kingdom: Animalia
- Phylum: Arthropoda
- Class: Insecta
- Order: Coleoptera
- Suborder: Polyphaga
- Infraorder: Scarabaeiformia
- Family: Scarabaeidae
- Genus: Serica
- Species: S. hongyii

Binomial name
- Serica hongyii Ahrens, Zhao, Pham & Liu, 2024

Species of beetle

Serica hongyii is a species of beetle of the family Scarabaeidae. It is found in China (Xizang).

== Description ==
Adults reach a length of about 7.8 mm. They have a dark yellowish brown, oblong body. The antennae and legs are yellow and there are dense, small, dark spots on the elytra. Except for the shiny head, the dorsal surface is dull, sparsely setose, and usually with lanceolate, white, setae and fine, long, erect, yellow setae.

== Etymology ==
The species is named after one of its collectors, Mr. Xu-Hong-Yi Zheng.
