= Serica tropdeana =

Scientific classification
- Kingdom: Animalia
- Phylum: Arthropoda
- Class: Insecta
- Order: Coleoptera
- Suborder: Polyphaga
- Infraorder: Scarabaeiformia
- Family: Scarabaeidae
- Genus: Serica
- Species: S. tropdeana

Binomial name
- Serica tropdeana Ahrens, 1999

Species of beetle

Serica tropdeana is a species of beetle of the family Scarabaeidae. It is found in China (Xizang) and Nepal.

== Description ==
Adults reach a length of about 8.4 mm. They have a reddish-brown, elongate body. The antennae are yellowish-brown. The upper surface is mostly dull and has a few erect white hairs.
