= Serica jani =

Scientific classification
- Kingdom: Animalia
- Phylum: Arthropoda
- Clade: Pancrustacea
- Class: Insecta
- Order: Coleoptera
- Suborder: Polyphaga
- Infraorder: Scarabaeiformia
- Family: Scarabaeidae
- Genus: Serica
- Species: S. jani

Binomial name
- Serica jani Ahrens, Fabrizi & Liu, 2022

Species of beetle

Serica jani is a species of beetle of the family Scarabaeidae. It is found in China (Zhejiang).

== Description ==
Adults reach a length of about 8.8–10 mm. They have a dark brown, dull, elongate body. The antennae and legs are reddish brown. The dorsal surface is almost glabrous, except for single and short, white setae on the pronotum and elytra.

== Etymology ==
The species is named after one of its collectors, Jan Růžička.
