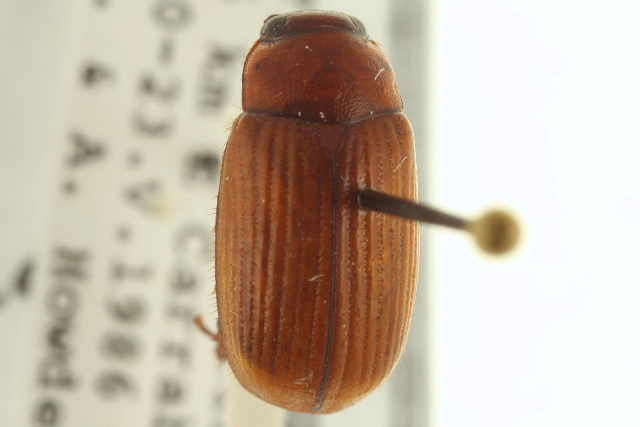

Scientific classification
- Kingdom: Animalia
- Phylum: Arthropoda
- Class: Insecta
- Order: Coleoptera
- Suborder: Polyphaga
- Infraorder: Scarabaeiformia
- Family: Scarabaeidae
- Genus: Serica
- Species: S. rhypha

Binomial name
- Serica rhypha Dawson, 1952

= Serica rhypha =

Species of beetle

Serica rhypha is a species of beetle of the family Scarabaeidae. It is found in the United States (Florida).

== Description ==
Adults reach a length of about 7 mm. The colour is light but dull golden brown. The surface is polished and shining.
