= Serica longula =

Scientific classification
- Kingdom: Animalia
- Phylum: Arthropoda
- Class: Insecta
- Order: Coleoptera
- Suborder: Polyphaga
- Infraorder: Scarabaeiformia
- Family: Scarabaeidae
- Genus: Serica
- Species: S. longula

Binomial name
- Serica longula Frey, 1972

Species of beetle

Serica longula is a species of beetle of the family Scarabaeidae. It is found in China (Fujian).

== Description ==
Adults reach a length of about 8.2 mm. They have an elongate body. The dorsal surface is yellow and dull and glabrous, the abdomen is brown and the antennae are yellow.
