= Serica guangxiensis =

Scientific classification
- Kingdom: Animalia
- Phylum: Arthropoda
- Class: Insecta
- Order: Coleoptera
- Suborder: Polyphaga
- Infraorder: Scarabaeiformia
- Family: Scarabaeidae
- Genus: Serica
- Species: S. guangxiensis

Binomial name
- Serica guangxiensis Ahrens, Zhao, Pham & Liu, 2024

Species of beetle

Serica guangxiensis is a species of beetle of the family Scarabaeidae. It is found in China (Guangxi).

== Description ==
Adults reach a length of about 8–8.8 mm. They have a dark reddish brown, oblong body. The antennae are yellow, while the legs are reddish brown. There are indistinct, large, darker spots on the elytra and the disc of the pronotum. The dorsal surface is dull and glabrous, except on the head and lateral margins of the pronotum and elytra. The pronotum and elytra have sparse, moderately long, white setae.

== Etymology ==
The species name refers to its occurrence in Guangxi province.
