= Serica bidentata =

Scientific classification
- Kingdom: Animalia
- Phylum: Arthropoda
- Clade: Pancrustacea
- Class: Insecta
- Order: Coleoptera
- Suborder: Polyphaga
- Infraorder: Scarabaeiformia
- Family: Scarabaeidae
- Genus: Serica
- Species: S. bidentata

Binomial name
- Serica bidentata Ahrens, 1999

Species of beetle

Serica bidentata is a species of beetle of the family Scarabaeidae. It is found in central Nepal.

== Description ==
Adults reach a length of about 6.5 mm. They have a light reddish-brown, elongate-oval body, with the forehead darker. The upper surface is mostly dull and has a few single, long hairs.
