= Serica parasquamosa =

Scientific classification
- Kingdom: Animalia
- Phylum: Arthropoda
- Class: Insecta
- Order: Coleoptera
- Suborder: Polyphaga
- Infraorder: Scarabaeiformia
- Family: Scarabaeidae
- Genus: Serica
- Species: S. parasquamosa

Binomial name
- Serica parasquamosa Ahrens, 2007

Species of beetle

Serica parasquamosa is a species of beetle of the family Scarabaeidae. It is found in China (Fujian, Hunan, Sichuan).

== Description ==
Adults reach a length of about 6.9–7.9 mm. They have a dark brown to reddish-brown, partially shimmering dark green, elongate-oval body. The antennae are yellowish-brown and the legs are yellow or reddish-brown. The surface is entirely dull, except for the shiny labroclypeus. The upper surface has dense, fine, white scale-like hairs as well as individual, erect, long, white scale-like setae. The elytra have a dark preapical spot.

== Etymology ==
The species name is derived from Greek para (meaning near) and Latin squamosus (meaning scaly).
