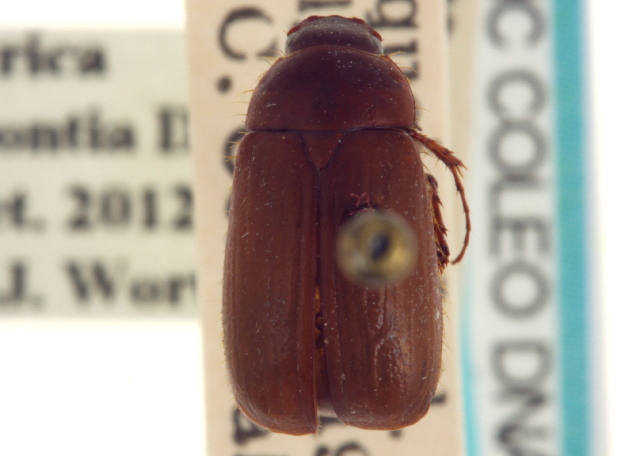

Scientific classification
- Kingdom: Animalia
- Phylum: Arthropoda
- Class: Insecta
- Order: Coleoptera
- Suborder: Polyphaga
- Infraorder: Scarabaeiformia
- Family: Scarabaeidae
- Genus: Serica
- Species: S. acontia

Binomial name
- Serica acontia Dawson, 1933

= Serica acontia =

Species of beetle

Serica acontia is a species of beetle of the family Scarabaeidae. It is found in the United States (California).

== Description ==
Adults reach a length of about 8 mm. The colour is brown (auburn to bay). They are sub-opaque with a trace of iridescence.
