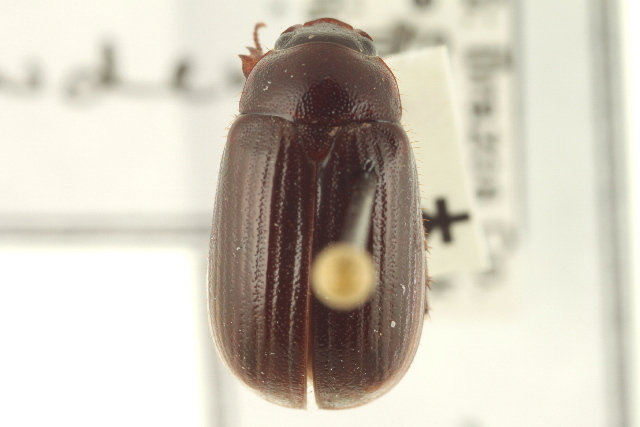

Scientific classification
- Kingdom: Animalia
- Phylum: Arthropoda
- Class: Insecta
- Order: Coleoptera
- Suborder: Polyphaga
- Infraorder: Scarabaeiformia
- Family: Scarabaeidae
- Genus: Serica
- Species: S. howdeni

Binomial name
- Serica howdeni Dawson, 1967

= Serica howdeni =

Species of beetle

Serica howdeni is a species of scarab beetle in the family Scarabaeidae. It is found in North America (Texas).

== Description ==
Adults reach a length of about 8 mm. The colour is dark brown. The surface is glabrous and shining, and densely covered with moderate-sized punctures.
