= Serica incognita =

Scientific classification
- Kingdom: Animalia
- Phylum: Arthropoda
- Class: Insecta
- Order: Coleoptera
- Suborder: Polyphaga
- Infraorder: Scarabaeiformia
- Family: Scarabaeidae
- Genus: Serica
- Species: S. incognita

Binomial name
- Serica incognita Ahrens, 1999

Species of beetle

Serica incognita is a species of beetle of the family Scarabaeidae. It is found from Bhutan to central Nepal.

== Description ==
Adults reach a length of about 8.8-8.9 mm. They have a chestnut brown, elongate body, with the pronotum and elytra lighter. The antennae are yellowish-brown. The upper surface is mostly dull and has some fine hairs.
