= Serica gwangjuensis =

Scientific classification
- Kingdom: Animalia
- Phylum: Arthropoda
- Class: Insecta
- Order: Coleoptera
- Suborder: Polyphaga
- Infraorder: Scarabaeiformia
- Family: Scarabaeidae
- Genus: Serica
- Species: S. gwangjuensis

Binomial name
- Serica gwangjuensis Ahrens, Zhao, Pham & Liu, 2024

Species of beetle

Serica gwangjuensis is a species of beetle of the family Scarabaeidae. It is found in South Korea.

== Description ==
Adults reach a length of about 7.4–7.6 mm. They have an oblong body. The body (including antennae and legs) is yellowish brown, while the eyes and frons are blackish and the elytra are without dark spots. The dorsal surface is shiny and finely shortly setose.

== Etymology ==
The species name refers to its type locality, Gwangju.
