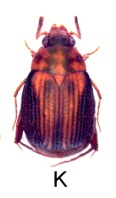

Scientific classification
- Kingdom: Animalia
- Phylum: Arthropoda
- Class: Insecta
- Order: Coleoptera
- Suborder: Polyphaga
- Infraorder: Scarabaeiformia
- Family: Scarabaeidae
- Genus: Serica
- Species: S. nana

Binomial name
- Serica nana Brenske, 1898

= Serica nana =

Species of beetle

Serica nana is a species of beetle of the family Scarabaeidae. It is found in Sri Lanka.

== Description ==
Adults reach a length of about 4.8 mm. They have a reddish brown, moderately oblong, suboval body, with the antennae and legs also reddish brown. The head and pronotum have a strong green metallic shine, while this shine is weak on the elytra. There are four dark spots on the pronotum. The dorsal surface is dull and minutely setose.
