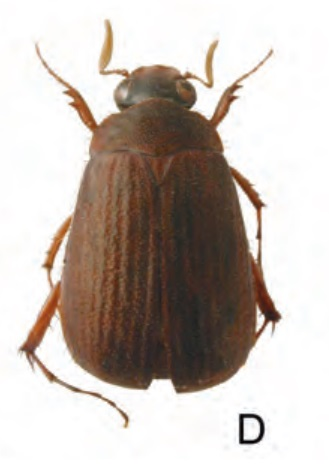

Scientific classification
- Kingdom: Animalia
- Phylum: Arthropoda
- Class: Insecta
- Order: Coleoptera
- Suborder: Polyphaga
- Infraorder: Scarabaeiformia
- Family: Scarabaeidae
- Genus: Serica
- Species: S. panchaseana

Binomial name
- Serica panchaseana Ahrens, 2004

= Serica panchaseana =

Species of beetle

Serica panchaseana is a species of beetle of the family Scarabaeidae. It is found in central Nepal (Annapurna mountains).

== Description ==
Adults reach a length of about 9.1–10 mm. They have a chestnut brown, elongate-oval body. The dorsal surface is dull with some setae on the head.

== Etymology ==
The species is named for its type locality, Mount Panchase.
