= Serica proclivis =

Scientific classification
- Kingdom: Animalia
- Phylum: Arthropoda
- Class: Insecta
- Order: Coleoptera
- Suborder: Polyphaga
- Infraorder: Scarabaeiformia
- Family: Scarabaeidae
- Genus: Serica
- Species: S. proclivis

Binomial name
- Serica proclivis Ahrens, 1999

Species of beetle

Serica proclivis is a species of beetle of the family Scarabaeidae. It is found in Nepal.

== Description ==
Adults reach a length of about 10.4 mm. They have a reddish-brown body, with the head, disc of the pronotum and spots on the elytra darker. The antennae are yellowish. The upper surface is mostly dull and nearly glabrous.
