= Serica qizhihaoi =

Scientific classification
- Kingdom: Animalia
- Phylum: Arthropoda
- Class: Insecta
- Order: Coleoptera
- Suborder: Polyphaga
- Infraorder: Scarabaeiformia
- Family: Scarabaeidae
- Genus: Serica
- Species: S. qizhihaoi

Binomial name
- Serica qizhihaoi Ahrens, Zhao, Pham & Liu, 2024

Species of beetle

Serica qizhihaoi is a species of beetle of the family Scarabaeidae. It is found in China (Xizang).

== Description ==
Adults reach a length of about 10.1–10.2 mm. They have an oblong body. The body (including antennae and legs) is reddish brown, while the antennal club is yellowish brown. The elytra have indistinct, darker spots. The dorsal surface is dull, the frons with green toment. There are white, scale-like setae on the pronotum and elytra. They are glabrous, except for the head and lateral margins of the pronotum and elytra.

== Etymology ==
The species is named after one of its collectors, Mr. Zhi-Hao Qi.
