= Serica jiulaoci =

Scientific classification
- Kingdom: Animalia
- Phylum: Arthropoda
- Class: Insecta
- Order: Coleoptera
- Suborder: Polyphaga
- Infraorder: Scarabaeiformia
- Family: Scarabaeidae
- Genus: Serica
- Species: S. jiulaoci

Binomial name
- Serica jiulaoci Ahrens, Zhao, Pham & Liu, 2024

Species of beetle

Serica jiulaoci is a species of beetle of the family Scarabaeidae. It is found in China (Sichuan).

== Description ==
Adults reach a length of about 9.5 mm. They have a dark brown, oblong body. The legs are reddish brown and the antennae are yellow. There are indistinct, dark spots on the elytra. The dorsal surface is dull and glabrous (except for the densely setose frons). The pronotum and elytra have sparse, short, white setae.

== Etymology ==
The species is named after its type locality, Jiulaoci.
