= Serica jindrai =

Scientific classification
- Kingdom: Animalia
- Phylum: Arthropoda
- Class: Insecta
- Order: Coleoptera
- Suborder: Polyphaga
- Infraorder: Scarabaeiformia
- Family: Scarabaeidae
- Genus: Serica
- Species: S. jindrai

Binomial name
- Serica jindrai Ahrens, 2007

Species of beetle

Serica jindrai is a species of beetle of the family Scarabaeidae. It is found in China (Guangdong, Guangxi, Guizhou, Hubei, Sichuan).

== Description ==
Adults reach a length of about 8.5–8.8 mm. They have a dark reddish-brown, elongate-oval body, partly shimmering dark green or simply glossy. The antennae and legs are yellowish-brown. The surface is entirely dull, except for the shiny labroclypeus. The upper surface has dense, fine, almost evenly distributed white scale-like hairs as well as individual, erect, long, white scale-like setae. The elytra have a dark preapical spot.

== Etymology ==
The species is named after its collector, Zd. Jindra.
