= Serica nepalensis =

Scientific classification
- Kingdom: Animalia
- Phylum: Arthropoda
- Class: Insecta
- Order: Coleoptera
- Suborder: Polyphaga
- Infraorder: Scarabaeiformia
- Family: Scarabaeidae
- Genus: Serica
- Species: S. nepalensis

Binomial name
- Serica nepalensis (Frey, 1969)

Synonyms
- Ophthalmoserica nepalensis Frey, 1969

Species of beetle

Serica nepalensis is a species of beetle of the family Scarabaeidae. It is found in Nepal and China (Xizang).

== Description ==
Adults reach a length of about 8.2–9.3 mm. They have a reddish-brown, elongate-oval body, with dark spots on the elytra. The forehead and disc of the pronotum are darker. The antennae are yellowish. The upper surface is mostly dull.
