= Serica tomiensis =

Scientific classification
- Kingdom: Animalia
- Phylum: Arthropoda
- Class: Insecta
- Order: Coleoptera
- Suborder: Polyphaga
- Infraorder: Scarabaeiformia
- Family: Scarabaeidae
- Genus: Serica
- Species: S. tomiensis

Binomial name
- Serica tomiensis Ahrens & Fabrizi, 2009

Species of beetle

Serica tomiensis is a species of beetle of the family Scarabaeidae. It is found in China (Xizang).

== Description ==
Adults reach a length of about 6.9 mm. They have a dark brown, oblong body. The antennae are yellowish and the legs and elytra are reddish brown, the latter with indistinct dark spots. The dorsal surface is mostly dull and sparsely setose.

== Etymology ==
The species is named after its type locality, Tomi.
