= Serica olivacea =

Scientific classification
- Kingdom: Animalia
- Phylum: Arthropoda
- Class: Insecta
- Order: Coleoptera
- Suborder: Polyphaga
- Infraorder: Scarabaeiformia
- Family: Scarabaeidae
- Genus: Serica
- Species: S. olivacea

Binomial name
- Serica olivacea Brenske, 1896

Species of beetle

Serica olivacea is a species of beetle of the family Scarabaeidae. It is found in India (Uttar Pradesh, Sikkim) and Nepal.

== Description ==
Adults reach a length of about 6.7 mm. They have a chestnut brown, elongate-oval body. The upper surface is dull (except for the shiny head) and nearly glabrous.
