= Serica frolovi =

Scientific classification
- Kingdom: Animalia
- Phylum: Arthropoda
- Class: Insecta
- Order: Coleoptera
- Suborder: Polyphaga
- Infraorder: Scarabaeiformia
- Family: Scarabaeidae
- Genus: Serica
- Species: S. frolovi

Binomial name
- Serica frolovi Ahrens, 2021

Species of beetle

Serica frolovi is a species of beetle of the family Scarabaeidae. It is found in Nepal.

== Description ==
Adults reach a length of about 9.6 mm. They have a dark brown, oblong body. The antennae and legs are yellowish and the ventral parts are reddish brown. The pronotal margins and punctures on the elytra are reddish brown. The dorsal surface is dull, the frons, pronotum and elytra with sparse white setae.

== Etymology ==
The species is named after Andrey Frolov.
