= Serica wrasei =

Scientific classification
- Kingdom: Animalia
- Phylum: Arthropoda
- Class: Insecta
- Order: Coleoptera
- Suborder: Polyphaga
- Infraorder: Scarabaeiformia
- Family: Scarabaeidae
- Genus: Serica
- Species: S. wrasei

Binomial name
- Serica wrasei Ahrens, 2007

Species of beetle

Serica wrasei is a species of beetle of the family Scarabaeidae. It is found in China (Guangxi, Hubei).

== Description ==
Adults reach a length of about 8.4 mm. They have a dark brown, partially shimmering dark green, elongate-oval body. The antennae are yellowish-brown and the legs are reddish-brown. The surface is entirely dull, except for the shiny labroclypeus. The upper surface has fine, loosely and evenly spaced, white scale-like hairs and single, erect, long, white scale-like setae. The elytra have a dark preapical angular marking.

== Etymology ==
The species is named after its collector, David Wrase.
