= Serica laguna =

Scientific classification
- Kingdom: Animalia
- Phylum: Arthropoda
- Class: Insecta
- Order: Coleoptera
- Suborder: Polyphaga
- Infraorder: Scarabaeiformia
- Family: Scarabaeidae
- Genus: Serica
- Species: S. laguna

Binomial name
- Serica laguna Saylor, 1935

Species of beetle

Serica laguna is a species of scarab beetle in the family Scarabaeidae. It is found in Central America and North America.
