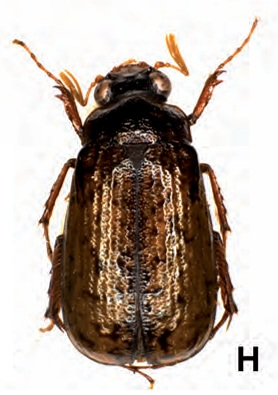

Scientific classification
- Kingdom: Animalia
- Phylum: Arthropoda
- Class: Insecta
- Order: Coleoptera
- Suborder: Polyphaga
- Infraorder: Scarabaeiformia
- Family: Scarabaeidae
- Genus: Serica
- Species: S. davidkrali

Binomial name
- Serica davidkrali Ahrens & Fabrizi, 2011

= Serica davidkrali =

Species of beetle

Serica davidkrali is a species of beetle of the family Scarabaeidae. It is found in China (Yunnan).

== Description ==
Adults reach a length of about 7.8–8.8 mm. They have a dark brown, oval-elongate body. The antennae, legs and elytra are yellowish brown, the latter with numerous small, irregular dark spots. The dorsal surface is shiny and sparsely setose.

== Etymology ==
The species name refers to David Král, Prague, who was one of the collectors of the species.
