= Serica jiangda =

Scientific classification
- Kingdom: Animalia
- Phylum: Arthropoda
- Class: Insecta
- Order: Coleoptera
- Suborder: Polyphaga
- Infraorder: Scarabaeiformia
- Family: Scarabaeidae
- Genus: Serica
- Species: S. jiangda

Binomial name
- Serica jiangda Ahrens, Zhao, Pham & Liu, 2024

Species of beetle

Serica jiangda is a species of beetle of the family Scarabaeidae. It is found in China (Xizang).

== Description ==
Adults reach a length of about 7.7–8.9 mm. They have a reddish brown, oblong body. The legs are also reddish brown, but the frons is darker and the antennae are yellow. There are large dark spots on the elytra, with lighter punctures. The dorsal surface is dull and glabrous, except for sparse, short, white setae on the elytra.

== Etymology ==
The species name refers to its type locality, Jiangda.
