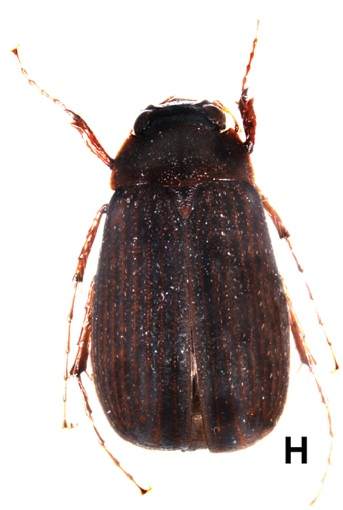

Scientific classification
- Kingdom: Animalia
- Phylum: Arthropoda
- Class: Insecta
- Order: Coleoptera
- Suborder: Polyphaga
- Infraorder: Scarabaeiformia
- Family: Scarabaeidae
- Genus: Serica
- Species: S. mahakaliensis

Binomial name
- Serica mahakaliensis Sreedevi, Speer, Fabrizi & Ahrens, 2018

= Serica mahakaliensis =

Species of beetle

Serica mahakaliensis is a species of beetle of the family Scarabaeidae. It is found in Nepal.

== Description ==
Adults reach a length of about 8-9.5 mm. They have a dark brown, oblong body. The antennae are yellowish and the ventral surface, elytral striae, legs, and lateral pronotal margins are reddish brown. The dorsal surface is dull and sparsely setose.

== Etymology ==
The species name refers to the Mahakali zone (Nepal).
