= Serica catalina =

Scientific classification
- Kingdom: Animalia
- Phylum: Arthropoda
- Class: Insecta
- Order: Coleoptera
- Suborder: Polyphaga
- Infraorder: Scarabaeiformia
- Family: Scarabaeidae
- Genus: Serica
- Species: S. catalina

Binomial name
- Serica catalina Dawson, 1947

Species of beetle

Serica catalina is a species of beetle of the family Scarabaeidae. It is found in the United States (California).

== Description ==
Adults reach a length of about 8 mm. The colour is brown (light to dark auburn). The surface is bare and shining with a trace of metallic or brassy iridescence.

== Etymology ==
The species is named after its type locality, Santa Catalina Island.
