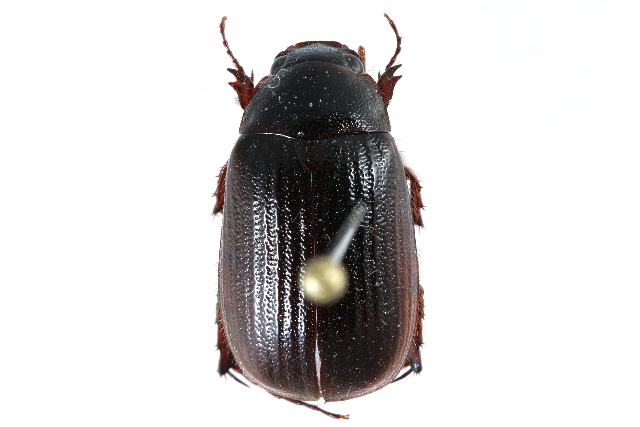

Scientific classification
- Kingdom: Animalia
- Phylum: Arthropoda
- Clade: Pancrustacea
- Class: Insecta
- Order: Coleoptera
- Suborder: Polyphaga
- Infraorder: Scarabaeiformia
- Family: Scarabaeidae
- Genus: Serica
- Species: S. georgiana

Binomial name
- Serica georgiana Leng, 1911

Synonyms
- Serica lecontei Dawson, 1921

= Serica georgiana =

Species of beetle

Serica georgiana is a species of scarab beetles in the family Scarabaeidae. It is native in North America, where it has been recorded from the United States and Canada.

== Description ==
Adults reach a length of about 9.5 mm. The colour varies from pale to very dark chestnut. The surface is polished and shining.

== Subspecies ==
- Serica georgiana georgiana (Alabama, Arkansas, Connecticut, Georgia, Indiana, Maryland, Massachusetts, Minnesota, New Hampshire, New Jersey, New York, North Carolina, Pennsylvania, Tennessee, Texas, Virginia, Canada)
- Serica georgiana lecontei Dawson, 1921 (Alabama, Connecticut, Delaware, Georgia, Illinois, Maine, Maryland, Massachusetts, Michigan, New Hampshire, New Jersey, New York, North Carolina, Pennsylvania, Rhode Island, Vermont, Virginia, Wisconsin, New Brunswick, Nova Scotia, Ontario, Prince Edward Island, Quebec)
