= Serica ensenada =

Scientific classification
- Kingdom: Animalia
- Phylum: Arthropoda
- Class: Insecta
- Order: Coleoptera
- Suborder: Polyphaga
- Infraorder: Scarabaeiformia
- Family: Scarabaeidae
- Genus: Serica
- Species: S. ensenada

Binomial name
- Serica ensenada Saylor, 1948

Species of beetle

Serica ensenada is a species of beetle of the family Scarabaeidae. It is found in the United States (California) and Mexico (Baja California).

== Description ==
Adults reach a length of about 9 mm. The colour is somewhat rufo-testaceous, with the elytra faintly shining and the thorax and front tawny coloured and very opaque. They are pilose above.
