= Serica tianmushan =

Scientific classification
- Kingdom: Animalia
- Phylum: Arthropoda
- Class: Insecta
- Order: Coleoptera
- Suborder: Polyphaga
- Infraorder: Scarabaeiformia
- Family: Scarabaeidae
- Genus: Serica
- Species: S. tianmushan

Binomial name
- Serica tianmushan Ahrens, Fabrizi & Liu, 2022

Species of beetle

Serica tianmushan is a species of beetle of the family Scarabaeidae. It is found in China (Fujian, Zhejiang).

== Description ==
Adults reach a length of about 8.6–8.9 mm. They have an elongate body. The dorsal surface is yellow, dull and glabrous, the abdomen is brown and the antennae are yellow.

== Etymology ==
The species name is derived from its type locality, Tianmushan.
