= Serica yexiaohani =

Scientific classification
- Kingdom: Animalia
- Phylum: Arthropoda
- Class: Insecta
- Order: Coleoptera
- Suborder: Polyphaga
- Infraorder: Scarabaeiformia
- Family: Scarabaeidae
- Genus: Serica
- Species: S. yexiaohani

Binomial name
- Serica yexiaohani Ahrens, Zhao, Pham & Liu, 2024

Species of beetle

Serica yexiaohani is a species of beetle of the family Scarabaeidae. It is found in China (Zhejiang).

== Description ==
Adults reach a length of about 7.5–7.7 mm. They have an oval body. The body (including legs) is dark reddish brown, while the femora and antennae are more yellowish, the head and pronotum darker and the elytra with irregular and sparse dark spots. The frons has green toment and the pronotum and elytra are iridescent. There are white, scale-like setae on the pronotum and elytra.

== Etymology ==
The species is named after one of its collectors, Mr. Xiao-Han Ye.
