= Serica rectidens =

Scientific classification
- Kingdom: Animalia
- Phylum: Arthropoda
- Class: Insecta
- Order: Coleoptera
- Suborder: Polyphaga
- Infraorder: Scarabaeiformia
- Family: Scarabaeidae
- Genus: Serica
- Species: S. rectidens

Binomial name
- Serica rectidens Ahrens & Fabrizi, 2009

Species of beetle

Serica rectidens is a species of beetle of the family Scarabaeidae. It is found in Bhutan, China (Xizang) and India (Arunachal Pradesh).

== Description ==
Adults reach a length of about 8-9.4 mm. They have a reddish brown, oblong body. The head is dark brown and the antennae are yellowish. The dorsal surface is dull, the frons, pronotal disc and elytra sparsely setose.

== Etymology ==
The name of the species is derived from Latin rectus (meaning upright) and dens (meaning tooth).
