= Serica tukucheana =

Scientific classification
- Kingdom: Animalia
- Phylum: Arthropoda
- Class: Insecta
- Order: Coleoptera
- Suborder: Polyphaga
- Infraorder: Scarabaeiformia
- Family: Scarabaeidae
- Genus: Serica
- Species: S. tukucheana

Binomial name
- Serica tukucheana Ahrens, 1999

Species of beetle

Serica tukucheana is a species of beetle of the family Scarabaeidae. It is found in Nepal and India (Sikkim).

== Description ==
Adults reach a length of about 10.3–10.5 mm. They have a dark brown, elongate-oval body. The margins of the pronotum and ventral surface are reddish-brown. The upper surface is mostly dull and there are a few short hairs on the pronotum and elytra.
