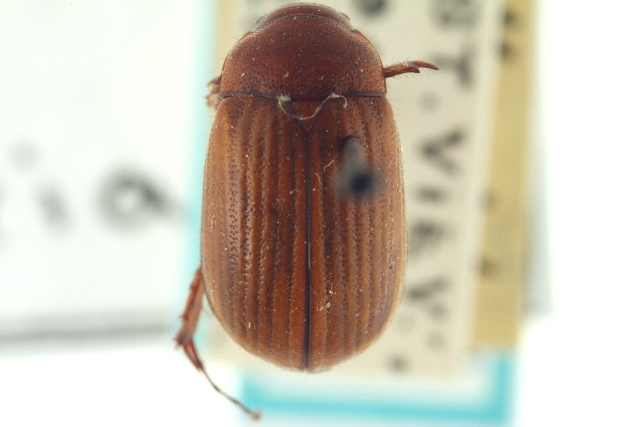

Scientific classification
- Kingdom: Animalia
- Phylum: Arthropoda
- Class: Insecta
- Order: Coleoptera
- Suborder: Polyphaga
- Infraorder: Scarabaeiformia
- Family: Scarabaeidae
- Genus: Serica
- Species: S. loxia

Binomial name
- Serica loxia Dawson, 1920

= Serica loxia =

Species of beetle

Serica loxia is a species of beetle of the family Scarabaeidae. It is found in the United States (Maryland to Georgia, west to Michigan and Missouri, Indiana, North Carolina, Wisconsin).

== Description ==
Adults reach a length of about 7 mm. The colour is auburn and the surface is bare, polished and shining.
