= Serica smetanai =

Scientific classification
- Kingdom: Animalia
- Phylum: Arthropoda
- Class: Insecta
- Order: Coleoptera
- Suborder: Polyphaga
- Infraorder: Scarabaeiformia
- Family: Scarabaeidae
- Genus: Serica
- Species: S. smetanai

Binomial name
- Serica smetanai Ahrens, Fabrizi & Liu, 2022

Species of beetle

Serica smetanai is a species of beetle of the family Scarabaeidae. It is found in Taiwan.

== Description ==
Adults reach a length of about 9.4 mm. They have a dark brown, dull, elongate body. The antennae are yellow and the base and margins of the pronotum are lighter. The dorsal surface is almost glabrous, except for some short, white setae on the elytra.

== Etymology ==
The species is named after its collector, Aleš Smetana.
