= Serica daqiaoana =

Scientific classification
- Kingdom: Animalia
- Phylum: Arthropoda
- Class: Insecta
- Order: Coleoptera
- Suborder: Polyphaga
- Infraorder: Scarabaeiformia
- Family: Scarabaeidae
- Genus: Serica
- Species: S. daqiaoana

Binomial name
- Serica daqiaoana Ahrens, Fabrizi & Liu, 2022

Species of beetle

Serica daqiaoana is a species of beetle of the family Scarabaeidae. It is found in China (Guangdong).

== Description ==
Adults reach a length of about 8.9–9.1 mm. They have an elongate body. The dorsal surface is yellow, dull and glabrous, while the ventral surface, frons and anterior portion of the pronotum are brown. The antennae are yellow.

== Etymology ==
The species name is derived from its type locality, Daqiao.
