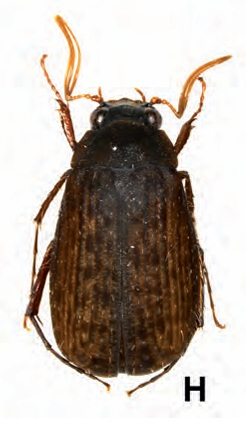

Scientific classification
- Kingdom: Animalia
- Phylum: Arthropoda
- Class: Insecta
- Order: Coleoptera
- Suborder: Polyphaga
- Infraorder: Scarabaeiformia
- Family: Scarabaeidae
- Genus: Serica
- Species: S. exhausta

Binomial name
- Serica exhausta Ahrens & Fabrizi, 2011

= Serica exhausta =

Species of beetle

Serica exhausta is a species of beetle of the family Scarabaeidae. It is found in Bhutan.

== Description ==
Adults reach a length of about 7.6–9 mm. They have an dark brown, oblong body. The antennae are yellowish, and the legs, labroclypeus, elytra and lateral margins of the pronotum are reddish brown, the elytra with indistinct irregular dark spots. The dorsal surface is dull, the frons and pronotum with moderately dense, erect setae.

== Etymology ==
The species name is derived from Latin exhaustus (meaning tired).
