= Serica moupinensis =

Scientific classification
- Kingdom: Animalia
- Phylum: Arthropoda
- Clade: Pancrustacea
- Class: Insecta
- Order: Coleoptera
- Suborder: Polyphaga
- Infraorder: Scarabaeiformia
- Family: Scarabaeidae
- Genus: Serica
- Species: S. moupinensis

Binomial name
- Serica moupinensis (Fairmaire, 1889)

Synonyms
- Omaloplia moupinensis Fairmaire, 1889

Species of beetle

Serica moupinensis is a species of beetle of the family Scarabaeidae. It is found in China (Sichuan) and Vietnam.

== Description ==
Adults reach a length of about 5.5–8 mm. They have an oval-oblong, convex, dark-velvety body. They are more or less covered with white setae and the elytra have dark-velvety spots. The pronotum is dark and the head brighter brownish-brown, but reddish in front and quite strongly punctate.
