= Serica variolosa =

Scientific classification
- Kingdom: Animalia
- Phylum: Arthropoda
- Class: Insecta
- Order: Coleoptera
- Suborder: Polyphaga
- Infraorder: Scarabaeiformia
- Family: Scarabaeidae
- Genus: Serica
- Species: S. variolosa

Binomial name
- Serica variolosa Motschulsky, 1863

Species of beetle

Serica variolosa is a species of beetle of the family Scarabaeidae. It is found in Sri Lanka.

== Description ==
They have a red-testaceous, elongate, sub-ovate, convex, sparsely punctate, velvety-opaque body, sprinkled with very short testaceous setae. The thorax has two large square spots.
