= Serica nigricans =

Scientific classification
- Kingdom: Animalia
- Phylum: Arthropoda
- Class: Insecta
- Order: Coleoptera
- Suborder: Polyphaga
- Infraorder: Scarabaeiformia
- Family: Scarabaeidae
- Genus: Serica
- Species: S. nigricans

Binomial name
- Serica nigricans Brenske, 1894

Species of beetle

Serica nigricans is a species of beetle of the family Scarabaeidae. It is found in Indonesia (Sumatra).

== Description ==
Adults reach a length of about 6.5 mm. The frons and pronotum are deeply dull, without distinct punctation. The punctate marks are scattered on the short thorax and bear extremely short hairs. The elytra are deeply streaked, the streaks formed from several rows of punctures. The intervening spaces are almost puncture-free, appearing somewhat darker than the streaks under the dense tomentum.
