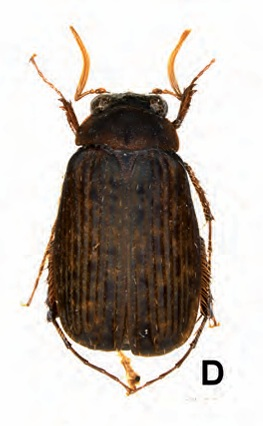

Scientific classification
- Kingdom: Animalia
- Phylum: Arthropoda
- Class: Insecta
- Order: Coleoptera
- Suborder: Polyphaga
- Infraorder: Scarabaeiformia
- Family: Scarabaeidae
- Genus: Serica
- Species: S. pelelaensis

Binomial name
- Serica pelelaensis Ahrens & Fabrizi, 2011

= Serica pelelaensis =

Species of beetle

Serica pelelaensis is a species of beetle of the family Scarabaeidae. It is found in Bhutan.

== Description ==
Adults reach a length of about 9.1–10.9 mm. They have an dark brown, oblong body. The antennae are yellowish, and the legs and pronotal margins are reddish brown. The elytra have indistinct irregular dark spots. The dorsal surface is dull, the frons with dense, erect setae.

== Etymology ==
The species is named after the type locality, Pele La.
