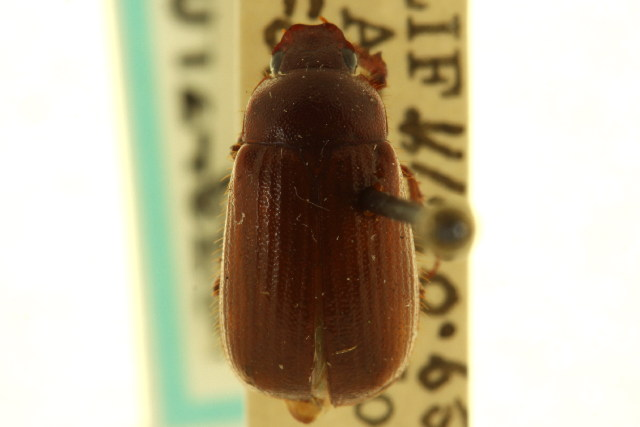

Scientific classification
- Kingdom: Animalia
- Phylum: Arthropoda
- Class: Insecta
- Order: Coleoptera
- Suborder: Polyphaga
- Infraorder: Scarabaeiformia
- Family: Scarabaeidae
- Genus: Serica
- Species: S. sculptilis

Binomial name
- Serica sculptilis Dawson, 1922

= Serica sculptilis =

Species of beetle

Serica sculptilis is a species of beetle of the family Scarabaeidae. It is found in the United States (California).

== Description ==
Adults reach a length of about 6.5–7 mm. The colour is bay to dark chestnut. The surface is bare and shining, without bloom or iridescence and nearly without pubescence (except for some erect, golden brown hairs in places, including along the margins of the pronotum and elytra).
