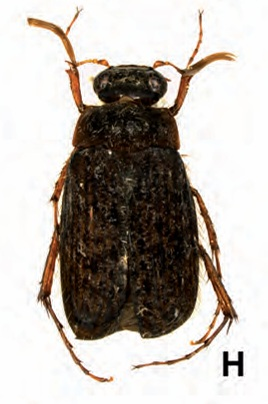

Scientific classification
- Kingdom: Animalia
- Phylum: Arthropoda
- Class: Insecta
- Order: Coleoptera
- Suborder: Polyphaga
- Infraorder: Scarabaeiformia
- Family: Scarabaeidae
- Genus: Serica
- Species: S. chinhillensis

Binomial name
- Serica chinhillensis Ahrens & Fabrizi, 2011

= Serica chinhillensis =

Species of beetle

Serica chinhillensis is a species of beetle of the family Scarabaeidae. It is found in Myanmar.

== Description ==
Adults reach a length of about 8.8–10.1 mm. They have an dark brown, oblong body. The antennae and legs are yellowish, while the elytral striae and lateral margins of the pronotum are reddish brown. The dorsal surface is dull. The frons, pronotum and elytra have sparse, erect setae.

== Etymology ==
The species name refers to its occurrence in the Chin Hills.
