= Serica cruzi =

Scientific classification
- Kingdom: Animalia
- Phylum: Arthropoda
- Class: Insecta
- Order: Coleoptera
- Suborder: Polyphaga
- Infraorder: Scarabaeiformia
- Family: Scarabaeidae
- Genus: Serica
- Species: S. cruzi

Binomial name
- Serica cruzi Saylor, 1939

Species of beetle

Serica cruzi is a species of beetle of the family Scarabaeidae. It is found in the United States (California).

== Description ==
Adults reach a length of about 5.4 mm. There are a few scattered hairs on the head and the thorax is glabrous, except for the lateral margins. The surface is shining.
