= Serica basumtsoensis =

Scientific classification
- Kingdom: Animalia
- Phylum: Arthropoda
- Class: Insecta
- Order: Coleoptera
- Suborder: Polyphaga
- Infraorder: Scarabaeiformia
- Family: Scarabaeidae
- Genus: Serica
- Species: S. basumtsoensis

Binomial name
- Serica basumtsoensis Ahrens, 2005

Species of beetle

Serica basumtsoensis is a species of beetle of the family Scarabaeidae. It is found in China (Xizang).
