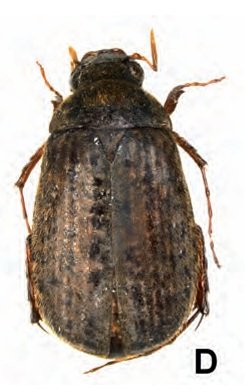

Scientific classification
- Kingdom: Animalia
- Phylum: Arthropoda
- Class: Insecta
- Order: Coleoptera
- Suborder: Polyphaga
- Infraorder: Scarabaeiformia
- Family: Scarabaeidae
- Genus: Serica
- Species: S. langeri

Binomial name
- Serica langeri Ahrens & Fabrizi, 2011

= Serica langeri =

Species of beetle

Serica langeri is a species of beetle of the family Scarabaeidae. It is found in Myanmar.

== Description ==
Adults reach a length of about 8.3–10.8 mm. They have an dark brown, elongate egg-shaped body. The antennae are yellowish and the legs are reddish brown. The dorsal surface is dull and densely covered with short yellow setae.

== Etymology ==
The species name refers to its collector, Michael Langer.
