= Serica anhua =

Scientific classification
- Kingdom: Animalia
- Phylum: Arthropoda
- Class: Insecta
- Order: Coleoptera
- Suborder: Polyphaga
- Infraorder: Scarabaeiformia
- Family: Scarabaeidae
- Genus: Serica
- Species: S. anhua

Binomial name
- Serica anhua Ahrens, Zhao, Pham & Liu, 2024

Species of beetle

Serica anhua is a species of beetle of the family Scarabaeidae. It is found in China (Hunan).

== Description ==
Adults reach a length of about 7.8 mm. They have a dark brown, oval and strongly convex body. The head, pronotum and some spots on the elytra have a greenish shine. The elytra have darker spots and the antennae are yellow. The dorsal surface is weakly shiny or iridescent, with dense, short, white setae.

== Etymology ==
The species name refers to its occurrence in Anhua County.
