= Serica caliginosa =

Scientific classification
- Kingdom: Animalia
- Phylum: Arthropoda
- Class: Insecta
- Order: Coleoptera
- Suborder: Polyphaga
- Infraorder: Scarabaeiformia
- Family: Scarabaeidae
- Genus: Serica
- Species: S. caliginosa

Binomial name
- Serica caliginosa Dawson, 1932

Synonyms
- Serica calignosa

Species of beetle

Serica caliginosa is a species of beetle of the family Scarabaeidae. It is found in the United States (California).

== Description ==
Adults reach a length of about 10 mm. The colour is black with a rusty or piceous tinge, and the elytra with a greyish or frosty bloom.
