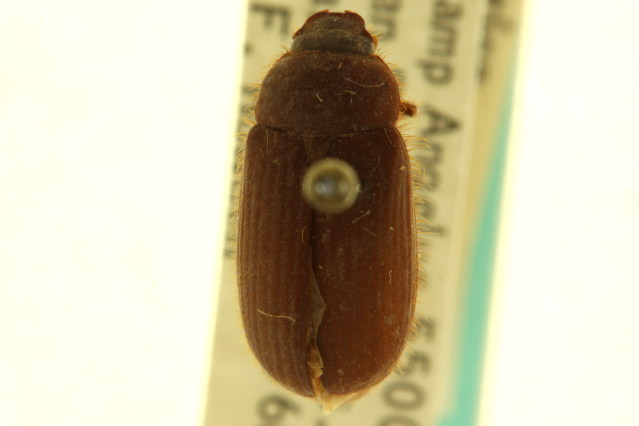

Scientific classification
- Kingdom: Animalia
- Phylum: Arthropoda
- Class: Insecta
- Order: Coleoptera
- Suborder: Polyphaga
- Infraorder: Scarabaeiformia
- Family: Scarabaeidae
- Genus: Serica
- Species: S. chaetosoma

Binomial name
- Serica chaetosoma Dawson, 1932

= Serica chaetosoma =

Species of beetle

Serica chaetosoma is a species of beetle of the family Scarabaeidae. It is found in the United States (California).

== Description ==
Adults reach a length of about 10 mm. The colour is dark brown (warm sepia), opaque with a slight greyish bloom or pollen on the elytra. The entire surface is bristling with short, erect, fulvous hairs.
