= Serica tianpingshanensis =

Scientific classification
- Kingdom: Animalia
- Phylum: Arthropoda
- Class: Insecta
- Order: Coleoptera
- Suborder: Polyphaga
- Infraorder: Scarabaeiformia
- Family: Scarabaeidae
- Genus: Serica
- Species: S. tianpingshanensis

Binomial name
- Serica tianpingshanensis Ahrens, Fabrizi & Liu, 2022

Species of beetle

Serica tianpingshanensis is a species of beetle of the family Scarabaeidae. It is found in China (Chongqing, Guizhou, Hubei, Hunan, Sichuan).

== Description ==
Adults reach a length of about 6.9–8.8 mm. They have a dark brown, dull, oval body. The ventral surface and legs are reddish brown, while the elytra are yellow brown with numerous dark spots. The antennae are yellow. The dorsal surface is almost glabrous, except for some single and short, white setae on the pronotum and elytra.

== Etymology ==
The species is named after its type locality, the Tianpingshan mountains.
