= Serica sherpa =

Scientific classification
- Kingdom: Animalia
- Phylum: Arthropoda
- Class: Insecta
- Order: Coleoptera
- Suborder: Polyphaga
- Infraorder: Scarabaeiformia
- Family: Scarabaeidae
- Genus: Serica
- Species: S. sherpa

Binomial name
- Serica sherpa (Sabatinelli & Migliaccio, 1982)

Synonyms
- Trichoserica sherpa Sabatinelli & Migliaccio, 1982

Species of beetle

Serica sherpa is a species of beetle of the family Scarabaeidae. It is found in China (Xizang) and Nepal.

== Description ==
Adults reach a length of about 6.2–8.1 mm. They have a dark chestnut brown, elongate-oval body. The legs, margins of the pronotum and ventral surface are reddish-brown, while the antennae are yellowish-brown. The upper surface is mostly dull and has a few erect white hairs.
