= Serica nigrovariata =

Scientific classification
- Kingdom: Animalia
- Phylum: Arthropoda
- Class: Insecta
- Order: Coleoptera
- Suborder: Polyphaga
- Infraorder: Scarabaeiformia
- Family: Scarabaeidae
- Genus: Serica
- Species: S. nigrovariata

Binomial name
- Serica nigrovariata Lewis, 1895

Synonyms
- Serica nigrovariata nigripennis Sawada, 1937

Species of beetle

Serica nigrovariata is a species of beetle of the family Scarabaeidae. It is found in Japan.

== Description ==
Adults reach a length of about 7 mm. They have an oblong, black and opaque body. The clypeus is emarginate anteriorly, with the rim, especially at the sides, strongly raised, and the surface rugosely punctured and shining. The head between the eyes is opaque, with scattered shallow punctures. The thorax is punctured like the head and the scutellum is obscurely punctured. The elytra are striate, with the interstices somewhat roughened, black on the outer and sutural margins, within reddish brown with black markings. The antennae and legs are dusky or obscurely black.
