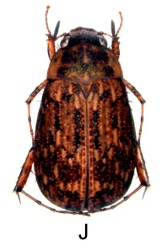

Scientific classification
- Kingdom: Animalia
- Phylum: Arthropoda
- Class: Insecta
- Order: Coleoptera
- Suborder: Polyphaga
- Infraorder: Scarabaeiformia
- Family: Scarabaeidae
- Genus: Serica
- Species: S. fusa

Binomial name
- Serica fusa Brenske, 1898

= Serica fusa =

Species of beetle

Serica fusa is a species of beetle of the family Scarabaeidae. It is found in Sri Lanka.

== Description ==
Adults reach a length of about 9.6 mm. They have a yellowish brown, oblong body, with the antennae and legs also yellowish brown. The head and pronotum are darker brown, with the midline, lateral margins and punctures yellowish. There are dark spots on the elytra. The dorsal surface is dull and nearly glabrous.
