= Serica sigipinensis =

Scientific classification
- Kingdom: Animalia
- Phylum: Arthropoda
- Class: Insecta
- Order: Coleoptera
- Suborder: Polyphaga
- Infraorder: Scarabaeiformia
- Family: Scarabaeidae
- Genus: Serica
- Species: S. sigipinensis

Binomial name
- Serica sigipinensis Ahrens, 2009

Species of beetle

Serica sigipinensis is a species of beetle of the family Scarabaeidae. It is found in China (Sichuan).

== Description ==
Adults reach a length of about 8.4 mm. They have a reddish brown, oblong body. The antennae and elytra are yellow with dark spots. The dorsal surface is dull and, except for a few fine hairs on the head and elytra, almost glabrous.

== Etymology ==
The species is named after its type locality, Si Gi Pin.
