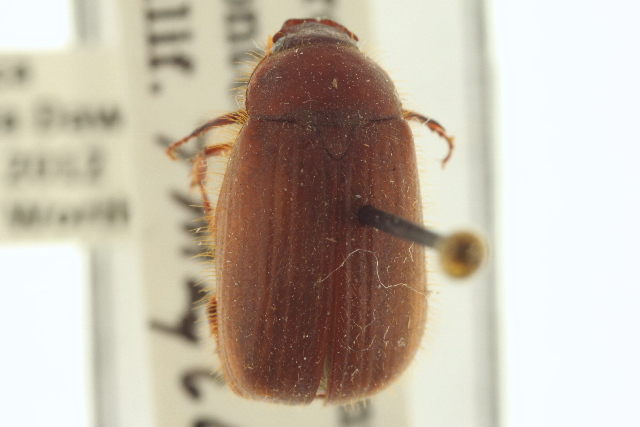

Scientific classification
- Kingdom: Animalia
- Phylum: Arthropoda
- Class: Insecta
- Order: Coleoptera
- Suborder: Polyphaga
- Infraorder: Scarabaeiformia
- Family: Scarabaeidae
- Genus: Serica
- Species: S. senta

Binomial name
- Serica senta Dawson, 1933

= Serica senta =

Species of beetle

Serica senta is a species of beetle of the family Scarabaeidae. It is found in the United States (California).

== Description ==
Adults reach a length of about 8-9.5 mm. The colour is brown (auburn to bay). The surface is subopaque but with a distinct sheen and iridescence.
