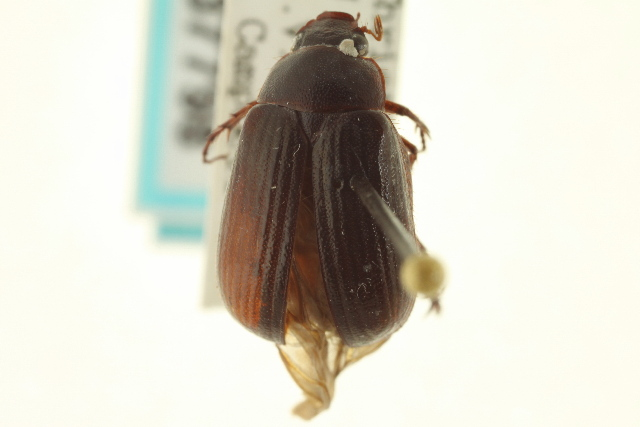

Scientific classification
- Kingdom: Animalia
- Phylum: Arthropoda
- Class: Insecta
- Order: Coleoptera
- Suborder: Polyphaga
- Infraorder: Scarabaeiformia
- Family: Scarabaeidae
- Genus: Serica
- Species: S. evidens

Binomial name
- Serica evidens Blatchley, 1919

Synonyms
- Serica carinata Blatchley, 1910

= Serica evidens =

Species of beetle

Serica evidens is a species of beetle of the family Scarabaeidae. It is found in the United States (Indiana, Illinois, Iowa, Kansas, Nebraska, New Jersey).

== Description ==
Adults reach a length of about 8–10 mm. They have a piceous-brown, feebly shining, oblong-oval body. The antennae, legs and under surface are reddish-brown.
