= Serica shiduensis =

Scientific classification
- Kingdom: Animalia
- Phylum: Arthropoda
- Class: Insecta
- Order: Coleoptera
- Suborder: Polyphaga
- Infraorder: Scarabaeiformia
- Family: Scarabaeidae
- Genus: Serica
- Species: S. shiduensis

Binomial name
- Serica shiduensis Ahrens, Fabrizi & Liu, 2022

Species of beetle

Serica shiduensis is a species of beetle of the family Scarabaeidae. It is found in China (Guizhou).

== Description ==
Adults reach a length of about 7–7.1 mm. They have an oval body. The dorsal surface is light reddish-brown and dull and the head is shiny, with dense, erect, moderately long setae. The antennae are yellow.

== Etymology ==
The species name is derived from its type locality, Shidu village.
