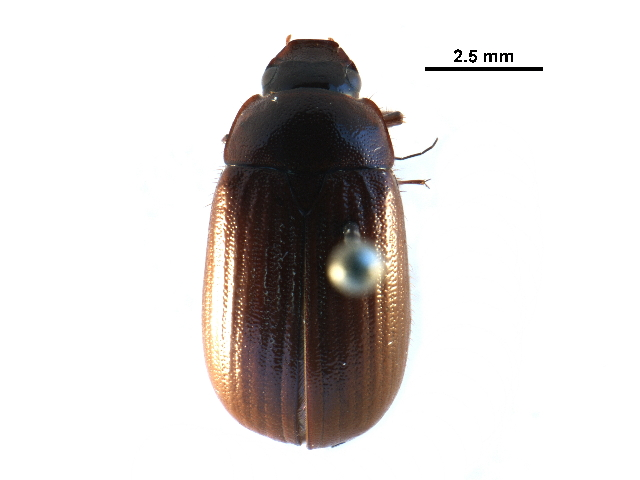

Scientific classification
- Kingdom: Animalia
- Phylum: Arthropoda
- Class: Insecta
- Order: Coleoptera
- Suborder: Polyphaga
- Infraorder: Scarabaeiformia
- Family: Scarabaeidae
- Genus: Serica
- Species: S. intermixta

Binomial name
- Serica intermixta Blatchley, 1910

= Serica intermixta =

Species of beetle

Serica intermixta is a species of scarab beetle in the family Scarabaeidae. It is found in North America (Arizona, Colorado, Connecticut, Florida, Georgia, Illinois, Indiana, Iowa, Kansas, Kentucky, Maryland, Massachusetts, Michigan, Minnesota, Mississippi, Missouri, Montana, Nebraska, New Hampshire, New Jersey, New Mexico, New York, North Carolina, North Dakota, South Carolina, South Dakota, Tennessee, Texas, Virginia, Wisconsin, Alberta, British Columbia, Manitoba, North West Territory, Ontario, Quebec, Saskatchewan) and has also been recorded from Germany.

== Description ==
Adults reach a length of about 7.5-9.5 mm. They are oblong, convex, smooth and shining. The colour ranges from dull brownish-yellow to chestnut-brown or even black.
