= Serica christophreuteri =

Scientific classification
- Kingdom: Animalia
- Phylum: Arthropoda
- Class: Insecta
- Order: Coleoptera
- Suborder: Polyphaga
- Infraorder: Scarabaeiformia
- Family: Scarabaeidae
- Genus: Serica
- Species: S. christophreuteri

Binomial name
- Serica christophreuteri Ahrens, Zhao, Pham & Liu, 2024

Species of beetle

Serica christophreuteri is a species of beetle of the family Scarabaeidae. It is found in Myanmar.

== Description ==
Adults reach a length of about 10.2 mm. They have a dark brown, oblong body. The antennae are yellow, the legs and ventral surface are reddish brown and the elytra are without spots. The dorsal surface is dull and glabrous, except for sparse setae on the elytra.

== Etymology ==
The species is named after its collector, Christoph Reuter.
