= Serica squamosa =

Scientific classification
- Kingdom: Animalia
- Phylum: Arthropoda
- Class: Insecta
- Order: Coleoptera
- Suborder: Polyphaga
- Infraorder: Scarabaeiformia
- Family: Scarabaeidae
- Genus: Serica
- Species: S. squamosa

Binomial name
- Serica squamosa Ahrens, 2007

Species of beetle

Serica squamosa is a species of beetle of the family Scarabaeidae. It is found in China (Fujian, Hubei, Jiangxi).

== Description ==
Adults reach a length of about 7.5–7.9 mm. They have a yellowish to reddish-brown, partially shimmering dark green, elongate-oval body. The antennae are yellowish-brown and the legs are yellowish-brown or reddish-brown. The surface is entirely dull, except for the shiny labroclypeus. The upper surface has fine, loosely and evenly distributed, white scale-like hairs as well as individual, erect, long, white scale-like setae. The elytra have a dark preapical spot.

== Etymology ==
The species name is derived from Latin squamosus (meaning scaly).
