= Serica latesquamata =

Scientific classification
- Kingdom: Animalia
- Phylum: Arthropoda
- Class: Insecta
- Order: Coleoptera
- Suborder: Polyphaga
- Infraorder: Scarabaeiformia
- Family: Scarabaeidae
- Genus: Serica
- Species: S. latesquamata

Binomial name
- Serica latesquamata Ahrens, 2007

Species of beetle

Serica latesquamata is a species of beetle of the family Scarabaeidae. It is found in Vietnam.

== Description ==
Adults reach a length of about 7.7–8.2 mm. They have a dark reddish-brown, partially shimmering dark green, elongate-oval body. The antennae and legs are yellowish-brown. The surface is entirely dull, except for the shiny labroclypeus. The upper surface has dense, fine, white scale-like hairs as well as individual, erect, long, white scale-like setae.

== Etymology ==
The species name is derived from Latin latus (meaning broad) and squamata (meaning scaly).
