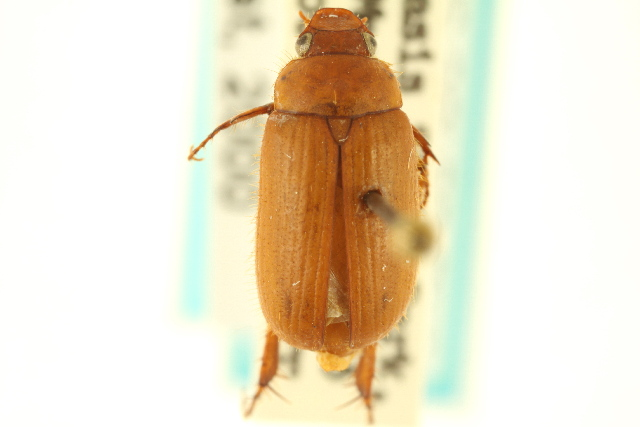

Scientific classification
- Kingdom: Animalia
- Phylum: Arthropoda
- Class: Insecta
- Order: Coleoptera
- Suborder: Polyphaga
- Infraorder: Scarabaeiformia
- Family: Scarabaeidae
- Genus: Serica
- Species: S. barri

Binomial name
- Serica barri Dawson, 1967

= Serica barri =

Species of beetle

Serica barri is a species of beetle of the family Scarabaeidae. It is found in the United States (Idaho).

== Description ==
Adults reach a length of about 5-7.5 mm. The colour is a middle shade of brown dulled by a thin, light grey dust and a trace of fine, pale pubescence, most evident on the bases of the front and middle legs and on the elytral margin.
