= Serica variegata =

Scientific classification
- Kingdom: Animalia
- Phylum: Arthropoda
- Class: Insecta
- Order: Coleoptera
- Suborder: Polyphaga
- Infraorder: Scarabaeiformia
- Family: Scarabaeidae
- Genus: Serica
- Species: S. variegata

Binomial name
- Serica variegata (Nomura, 1974)

Synonyms
- Taiwanoserica variegata Nomura, 1974

Species of beetle

Serica variegata is a species of beetle of the family Scarabaeidae. It is found in Taiwan.

== Description ==
Adults reach a length of about 9.6 mm.
