= Serica fengxue =

Scientific classification
- Kingdom: Animalia
- Phylum: Arthropoda
- Class: Insecta
- Order: Coleoptera
- Suborder: Polyphaga
- Infraorder: Scarabaeiformia
- Family: Scarabaeidae
- Genus: Serica
- Species: S. fengxue

Binomial name
- Serica fengxue Ahrens, Zhao, Pham & Liu, 2024

Species of beetle

Serica fengxue is a species of beetle of the family Scarabaeidae. It is found in China (Yunnan).

== Description ==
Adults reach a length of about 9.8 mm. They have a dark brown, narrow, oblong body. The antennae are yellow and the elytra and legs red-brown. The elytra with large reddish spots. The dorsal surface is dull with fine and dense, short and moderately long, semi-erect setae.

== Etymology ==
The species name refers to its type locality, the Fengxue Mountain Pass.
