= Serica zhamu =

Scientific classification
- Kingdom: Animalia
- Phylum: Arthropoda
- Class: Insecta
- Order: Coleoptera
- Suborder: Polyphaga
- Infraorder: Scarabaeiformia
- Family: Scarabaeidae
- Genus: Serica
- Species: S. zhamu

Binomial name
- Serica zhamu Ahrens, Zhao, Pham & Liu, 2024

Species of beetle

Serica zhamu is a species of beetle of the family Scarabaeidae. It is found in China (Xizang).

== Description ==
Adults reach a length of about 7–7.2 mm. They have a red-brown, oblong body, with a darker head. The antennae are yellow and the legs are yellowish brown. There are indistinct, slightly darker spots on the elytra. The dorsal surface is dull and mostly glabrous, except for sparse, moderately long, white setae on the pronotum and elytra.

== Etymology ==
The species name refers to its type locality, Zhamu.
