= Serica filitarsata =

Scientific classification
- Kingdom: Animalia
- Phylum: Arthropoda
- Class: Insecta
- Order: Coleoptera
- Suborder: Polyphaga
- Infraorder: Scarabaeiformia
- Family: Scarabaeidae
- Genus: Serica
- Species: S. filitarsata

Binomial name
- Serica filitarsata Ahrens, 1999

Species of beetle

Serica filitarsata is a species of beetle of the family Scarabaeidae. It is found in Bhutan.

== Description ==
Adults reach a length of about 11.2-11.3 mm. They have a light chestnut brown, elongate body, with the head and the disc of the pronotum darker. The upper surface is mostly dull (partly with a greenish sheen) and has short hairs.
