= Serica shengtangshan =

Scientific classification
- Kingdom: Animalia
- Phylum: Arthropoda
- Class: Insecta
- Order: Coleoptera
- Suborder: Polyphaga
- Infraorder: Scarabaeiformia
- Family: Scarabaeidae
- Genus: Serica
- Species: S. shengtangshan

Binomial name
- Serica shengtangshan Ahrens, Fabrizi & Liu, 2022

Species of beetle

Serica shengtangshan is a species of beetle of the family Scarabaeidae. It is found in China (Guangxi).

== Description ==
Adults reach a length of about 8.4 mm. They have a dark brown, dull, elongate body. The legs are reddish brown, the elytra yellow brown with dark spots and the antennae are yellow. The dorsal surface is almost glabrous, except for single and short, white setae on the pronotum and elytra.

== Etymology ==
The species is named after its type locality, the Shengtangshan mountains.
