= Serica caiyiyiae =

Scientific classification
- Kingdom: Animalia
- Phylum: Arthropoda
- Class: Insecta
- Order: Coleoptera
- Suborder: Polyphaga
- Infraorder: Scarabaeiformia
- Family: Scarabaeidae
- Genus: Serica
- Species: S. caiyiyiae

Binomial name
- Serica caiyiyiae Zhao & Ahrens, 2023

Species of beetle

Serica caiyiyiae is a species of beetle of the family Scarabaeidae. It is found in China (Guizhou).

== Description ==
Adults reach a length of about 8.2–8.6 mm. They have a dark brown, ovoid body. The anterior two thirds of the labroclypeus and legs are reddish brown, while the antennae are yellowish brown.

== Etymology ==
The species is dedicated to Ms. Yi-Yi Cai, the mother of Mr. Bao-Xiang Zhan.
