= Serica pigrans =

Scientific classification
- Kingdom: Animalia
- Phylum: Arthropoda
- Class: Insecta
- Order: Coleoptera
- Suborder: Polyphaga
- Infraorder: Scarabaeiformia
- Family: Scarabaeidae
- Genus: Serica
- Species: S. pigrans

Binomial name
- Serica pigrans Ahrens & Fabrizi, 2009

Species of beetle

Serica pigrans is a species of beetle of the family Scarabaeidae. It is found in China (Xizang) and India (Arunachal Pradesh).

== Description ==
Adults reach a length of about 7.5 mm. They have a dark brown, oblong body. The antennae are yellowish and the legs, pronotal borders and elytra are reddish brown, the latter with indistinct dark spots. The dorsal surface is dull and sparsely setose.

== Etymology ==
The name of the species is derived from Latin pigrans (meaning lazy or slow).
