= Serica semicribrosa =

Scientific classification
- Kingdom: Animalia
- Phylum: Arthropoda
- Class: Insecta
- Order: Coleoptera
- Suborder: Polyphaga
- Infraorder: Scarabaeiformia
- Family: Scarabaeidae
- Genus: Serica
- Species: S. semicribrosa

Binomial name
- Serica semicribrosa Fairmaire, 1886

Species of beetle

Serica semicribrosa is a species of beetle of the family Scarabaeidae. It is found in Madagascar.

== Description ==
Adults reach a length of about 10 mm. They have a large, broad, yellowish-brown, shiny body. The pronotum is densely and strongly punctate and the posterior corners are not rounded. The posterior margin has a deep marginal line. The scutellum is dull and the elytra have fine ribs.
