= Serica zhenba =

Scientific classification
- Kingdom: Animalia
- Phylum: Arthropoda
- Class: Insecta
- Order: Coleoptera
- Suborder: Polyphaga
- Infraorder: Scarabaeiformia
- Family: Scarabaeidae
- Genus: Serica
- Species: S. zhenba

Binomial name
- Serica zhenba Ahrens, Fabrizi & Liu, 2022

Species of beetle

Serica zhenba is a species of beetle of the family Scarabaeidae. It is found in China (Shaanxi).

== Description ==
Adults reach a length of about 9 mm. They have a dark brown, dull, oval body. The legs are reddish brown, the elytra yellowish brown with dark spots and the antennae are yellow. The dorsal surface has numerous, short, white setae on the pronotum and elytra.

== Etymology ==
The species is named after its type locality, Zhenba.
