= Serica inaequalis =

Scientific classification
- Kingdom: Animalia
- Phylum: Arthropoda
- Class: Insecta
- Order: Coleoptera
- Suborder: Polyphaga
- Infraorder: Scarabaeiformia
- Family: Scarabaeidae
- Genus: Serica
- Species: S. inaequalis

Binomial name
- Serica inaequalis Ahrens, 2007

Species of beetle

Serica inaequalis is a species of beetle of the family Scarabaeidae. It is found in Vietnam.

== Description ==
Adults reach a length of about 9.1 mm. They have a dark reddish-brown, elongate-oval body, partly shimmering dark green. The antennae and legs are yellowish-brown. The surface is entirely dull, except for the shiny labroclypeus. The upper surface has dense, fine, almost evenly distributed white scale-like hairs as well as individual, erect, long, white scale-like setae.

== Etymology ==
The species name is derived from Latin word inaequalis (meaning unequal).
