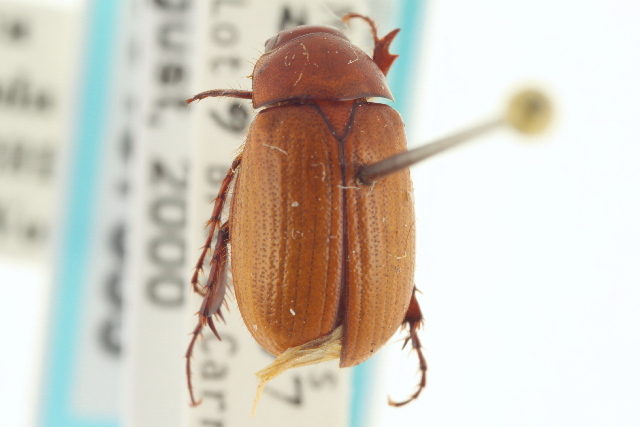

Scientific classification
- Kingdom: Animalia
- Phylum: Arthropoda
- Class: Insecta
- Order: Coleoptera
- Suborder: Polyphaga
- Infraorder: Scarabaeiformia
- Family: Scarabaeidae
- Genus: Serica
- Species: S. porcula

Binomial name
- Serica porcula Casey, 1884

= Serica porcula =

Species of beetle

Serica porcula is a species of scarab beetle in the family Scarabaeidae. It is found in North America (Arizona, Colorado, New Mexico, Texas, Wyoming).

== Description ==
Adults reach a length of about 7 mm. They are dark reddish brown, with the legs and under surface slightly paler. They are shining throughout, but not iridescent and glabrous above. The pronotum is finely and somewhat irregularly punctate, but narrowly impunctate along the middle. The scutellum is as wide as long, triangular and acutely rounded at the tip. It is punctate except broadly along the middle. The elytra are at base as wide as the pronotum, widest at two-thirds the length from the base. The sides are very feebly arcuate. The longitudinal costae are very feeble, broadly convex, impunctate and polished, the intervals much narrower, finely and very irregularly punctate. The punctures are round and rather feebly impressed.
