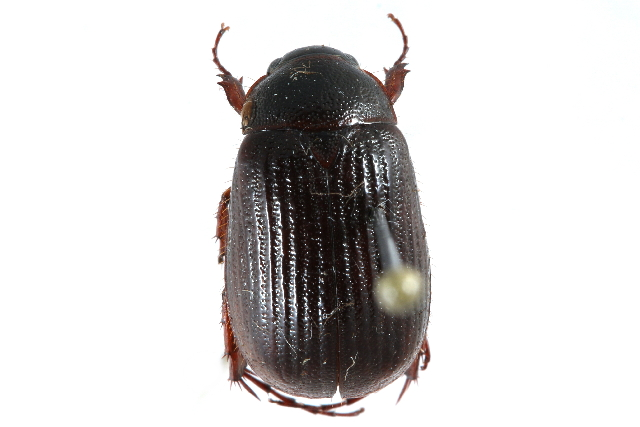

Scientific classification
- Kingdom: Animalia
- Phylum: Arthropoda
- Class: Insecta
- Order: Coleoptera
- Suborder: Polyphaga
- Infraorder: Scarabaeiformia
- Family: Scarabaeidae
- Genus: Serica
- Species: S. sponsa

Binomial name
- Serica sponsa Dawson, 1919

= Serica sponsa =

Species of beetle

Serica sponsa is a species of scarab beetle in the family Scarabaeidae. It is found in North America (Ontario, Quebec, Indiana, Iowa, New Jersey, New York, Ohio, Wisconsin).

== Description ==
Adults reach a length of about 8–9 mm. The colour varies from chestnut-brown to nearly black. The surface is highly polished and shining.
