= Serica palaea =

Scientific classification
- Kingdom: Animalia
- Phylum: Arthropoda
- Class: Insecta
- Order: Coleoptera
- Suborder: Polyphaga
- Infraorder: Scarabaeiformia
- Family: Scarabaeidae
- Genus: Serica
- Species: S. palaea

Binomial name
- Serica palaea Ahrens, 2004

Species of beetle

Serica palaea is a species of beetle of the family Scarabaeidae. It is found in India (Sikkim).

== Description ==
Adults reach a length of about 7.7–8 mm. They have a dark brown, elongate body, with yellowish brown antennae. The upper surface is metallic dark green and with some reddish-brown spots.

== Etymology ==
The species name is derived from Ancient Greek palaea (meaning old).
