= Serica nigroguttata =

Scientific classification
- Kingdom: Animalia
- Phylum: Arthropoda
- Class: Insecta
- Order: Coleoptera
- Suborder: Polyphaga
- Infraorder: Scarabaeiformia
- Family: Scarabaeidae
- Genus: Serica
- Species: S. nigroguttata

Binomial name
- Serica nigroguttata Brenske, 1898

Species of beetle

Serica nigroguttata is a species of beetle of the family Scarabaeidae. It is found in China (Fujian, Guangdong, Hong Kong, Hubei, Hunan, Jiangsu, Jiangxi, Shandong, Shanghai, Sichuan), Taiwan and Vietnam.

== Description ==
Adults reach a length of about 8.1–8.9 mm. They have a yellowish to dark brown, partially shimmering dark green, elongate-oval body. The antennae are yellowish-brown and the legs are yellowish or reddish-brown. The surface is entirely dull, except for the shiny labroclypeus. The upper surface has dense, fine, white scale-like hairs as well as individual, erect, long, white scale-like setae. The elytra have a dark preapical spot.
