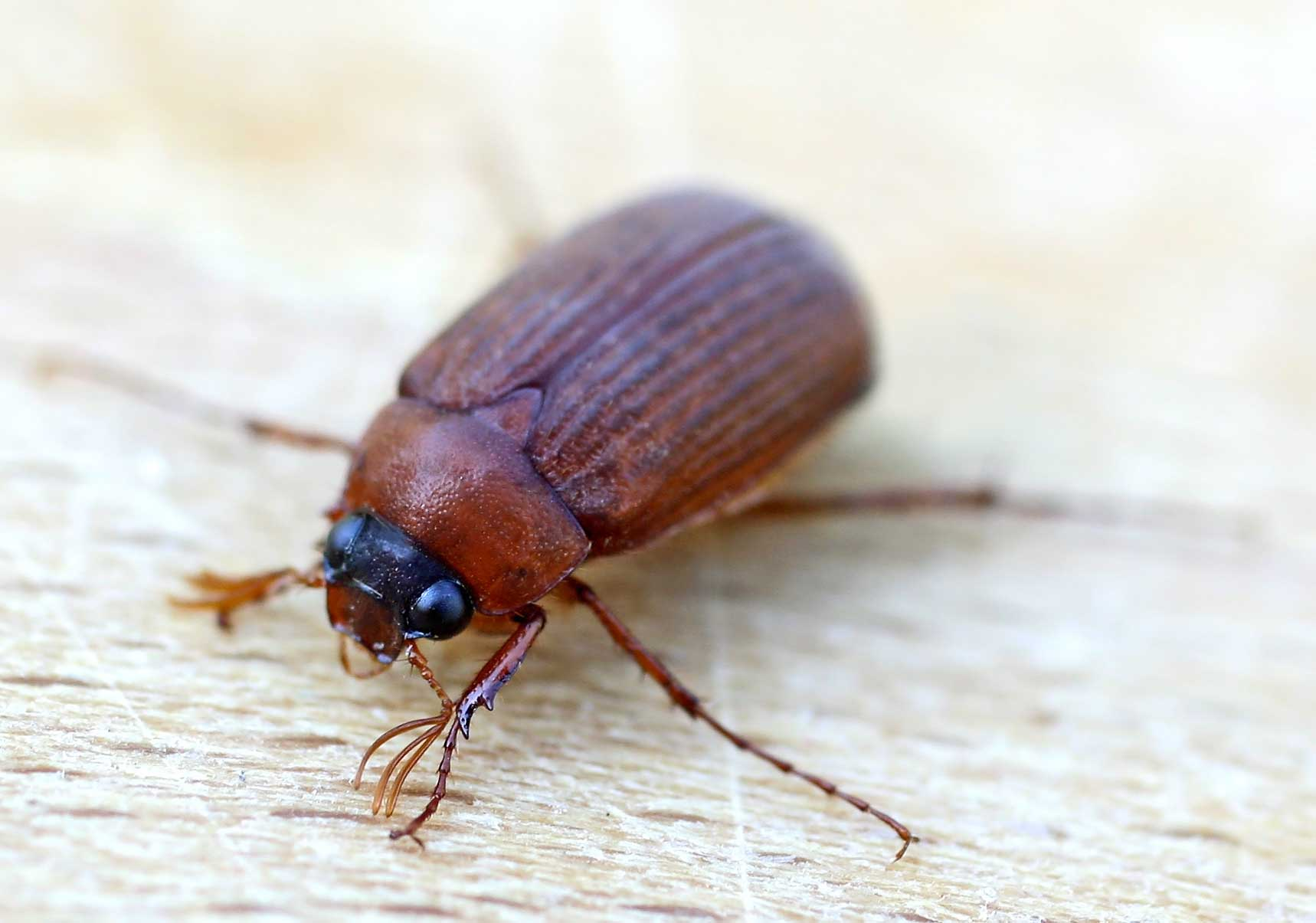
- on light wood

Conservation status
- Least Concern (IUCN 3.1)

Scientific classification
- Kingdom: Animalia
- Phylum: Arthropoda
- Class: Insecta
- Order: Coleoptera
- Suborder: Polyphaga
- Infraorder: Scarabaeiformia
- Family: Scarabaeidae
- Genus: Serica
- Species: S. brunnea

Binomial name
- Serica brunnea (Linnaeus, 1758)

Synonyms
- Scarabaeus brunneus Linnaeus, 1758; Serica brunnea berardii Luigioni, 1929; Serica brunnea heymesi Hubenthal, 1915; Melolontha erythrocephala Petagna, 1786; Scarabaeus fulvescens Geoffroy, 1785; Scarabaeus fulvus Degeer, 1774

= Serica brunnea =

Species of beetle

Serica brunnea, the brown chafer, is a species of beetle of the family Scarabaeidae. It is found in Albania, Austria, Belarus, Belgium, Bosnia Herzegovina, Bulgaria, China (Xinjiang), Croatia, the Czech Republic, Denmark, Finland, France, Germany, Great Britain, Hungary, Ireland, Italy, Kazakhstan, Latvia, Lichtenstein, Lithuania, Luxembourg, North Macedonia, Moldova, Mongolia, the Netherlands, Norway, Poland, Romania, Russia, Serbia, Slovakia, Slovenia, Spain, Sweden, Switzerland and Ukraine.

== Description ==
Adults reach a length of about 7–10 mm. They are yellowish-brown. The upper surface of the pronotum is finely punctate, with small lateral cilia. The elytra have densely and irregularly punctured striae, with narrow, raised, less punctured intervals. They are attracted to artificial lights.
