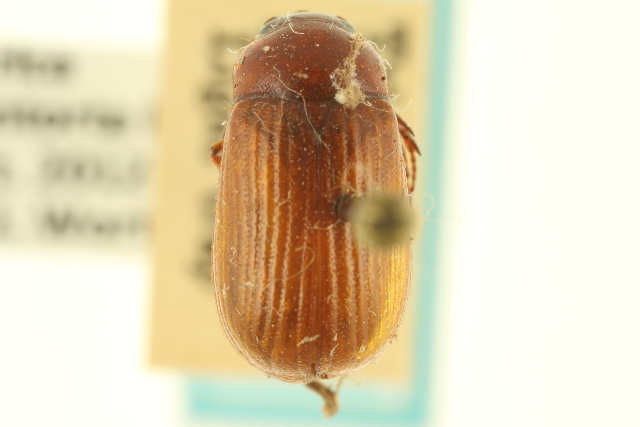

Scientific classification
- Kingdom: Animalia
- Phylum: Arthropoda
- Class: Insecta
- Order: Coleoptera
- Suborder: Polyphaga
- Infraorder: Scarabaeiformia
- Family: Scarabaeidae
- Genus: Serica
- Species: S. contorta

Binomial name
- Serica contorta Dawson, 1947

= Serica contorta =

Species of beetle

Serica contorta is a species of beetle of the family Scarabaeidae. It is found in the United States (Arkansas, Oklahoma, Texas).

== Description ==
Adults reach a length of about 7 mm. The colour is light brown (amber brown to argus brown) and the surface is polished and shining. The striae and margins of the elytra have short, inconspicuous hairs in sparse single rows.
