= Serica gracilipes =

Scientific classification
- Kingdom: Animalia
- Phylum: Arthropoda
- Clade: Pancrustacea
- Class: Insecta
- Order: Coleoptera
- Suborder: Polyphaga
- Infraorder: Scarabaeiformia
- Family: Scarabaeidae
- Genus: Serica
- Species: S. gracilipes

Binomial name
- Serica gracilipes Moser, 1915

Species of beetle

Serica gracilipes is a species of beetle of the family Scarabaeidae. It is found in India (Tamil Nadu).

== Description ==
Adults reach a length of about 7 mm. They are dull, with the upper surface dark brown, while the underside is light brown and the frons is blackish. The head is weakly punctate and the antennae are reddish-yellow. The pronotum has weak punctation, and the punctures, like those of the elytra, show tiny setae. The elytra are irregularly punctate in rows within the striae, with the interstices almost devoid of punctures.
