= Serica spicula =

Scientific classification
- Kingdom: Animalia
- Phylum: Arthropoda
- Class: Insecta
- Order: Coleoptera
- Suborder: Polyphaga
- Infraorder: Scarabaeiformia
- Family: Scarabaeidae
- Genus: Serica
- Species: S. spicula

Binomial name
- Serica spicula Dawson, 1921

Species of beetle

Serica spicula is a species of beetle of the family Scarabaeidae. It is found in the United States (Georgia).

== Description ==
Adults reach a length of about 7.5 mm. The colour is claret brown to chestnut. The surface is bare, polished and shining.
