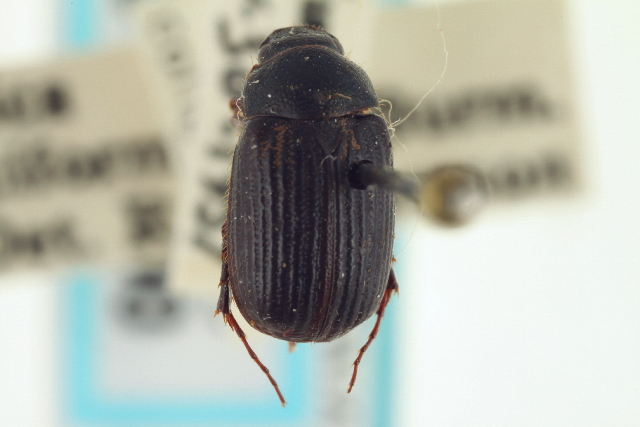

Scientific classification
- Kingdom: Animalia
- Phylum: Arthropoda
- Class: Insecta
- Order: Coleoptera
- Suborder: Polyphaga
- Infraorder: Scarabaeiformia
- Family: Scarabaeidae
- Genus: Serica
- Species: S. trociformis

Binomial name
- Serica trociformis Burmeister, 1844

Synonyms
- Melolontha aphodiina Billberg, 1820

= Serica trociformis =

Species of beetle

Serica trociformis is a species of May beetle or June bug in the family Scarabaeidae. It is found in North America (Georgia, North Carolina, South Carolina).

== Description ==
Adults reach a length of about 5–6 mm. They have an ovate, convex, nearly smooth and feebly shining body. The head, thorax and under surface are black or piceous, while the elytra are reddish-brown, the sides margined with piceous.
