= Serica longipes =

Scientific classification
- Kingdom: Animalia
- Phylum: Arthropoda
- Class: Insecta
- Order: Coleoptera
- Suborder: Polyphaga
- Infraorder: Scarabaeiformia
- Family: Scarabaeidae
- Genus: Serica
- Species: S. longipes

Binomial name
- Serica longipes Ahrens, Fabrizi & Liu, 2022

Species of beetle

Serica longipes is a species of beetle of the family Scarabaeidae. It is found in China (Guizhou, Yunnan).

== Description ==
Adults reach a length of about 9–9.8 mm. They have a dark reddish brown, dull, oblong body. The legs are brown and the antennae are yellow. There are numerous short and long setae on the dorsal surface.

== Etymology ==
The species name is derived from Latin long (meaning long) and pes (meaning leg) and refers to the long legs of the species.
