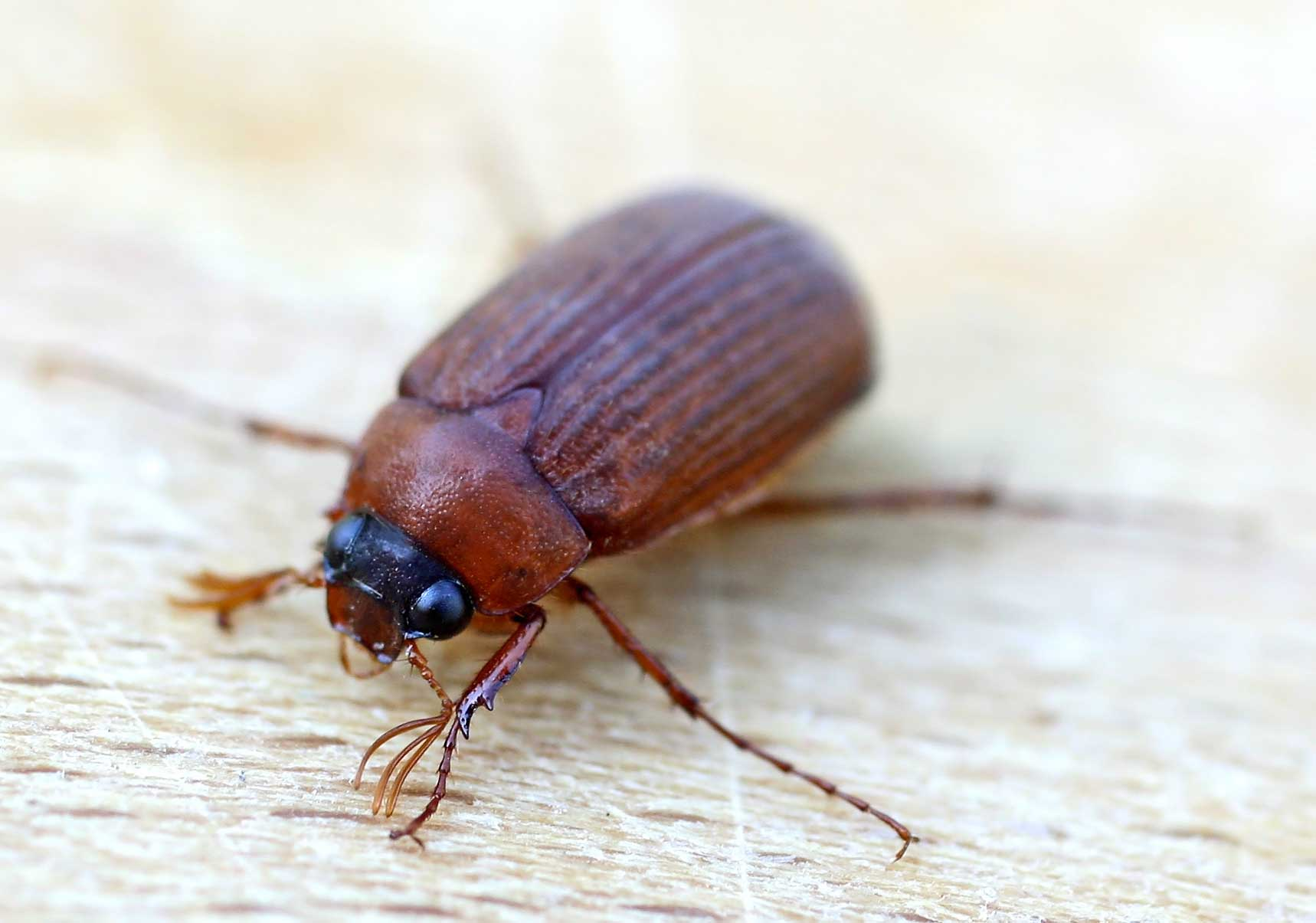
- Serica brunnea

Scientific classification
- Kingdom: Animalia
- Phylum: Arthropoda
- Clade: Pancrustacea
- Class: Insecta
- Order: Coleoptera
- Suborder: Polyphaga
- Infraorder: Scarabaeiformia
- Family: Scarabaeidae
- Tribe: Sericini
- Genus: Serica; MacLeay, 1819

Synonyms
- Camptorhina Kirby, 1837; Ophthalmosericea Brenske, 1897; Podosericea Breit, 1912; Trichosericea Reitter, 1896; Emphania Blanchard, 1850; Paramaladera Nikolajev, 1979; Stilbolemma Harris, 1827

= Serica (beetle) =

Genus of beetles

Serica is a genus from the group of May beetles and junebugs in the family Scarabaeidae. There are at least 100 described species in Serica.

== See also ==
- List of Serica species
