= Spiraea obovata =

Spiraea obovata can refer to the following plant species:

- Spiraea obovata Raf., a synonym of Spiraea latifolia (Aiton) Borkh.
- Spiraea obovata Rchb., a synonym of Spiraea hypericifolia L. subsp. obovata (Waldst. & Kit. ex Willd.) H.Huber
- Spiraea obovata Waldst. & Kit. ex Willd., a synonym of Spiraea hypericifolia L. subsp. obovata (Waldst. & Kit. ex Willd.) H.Huber
