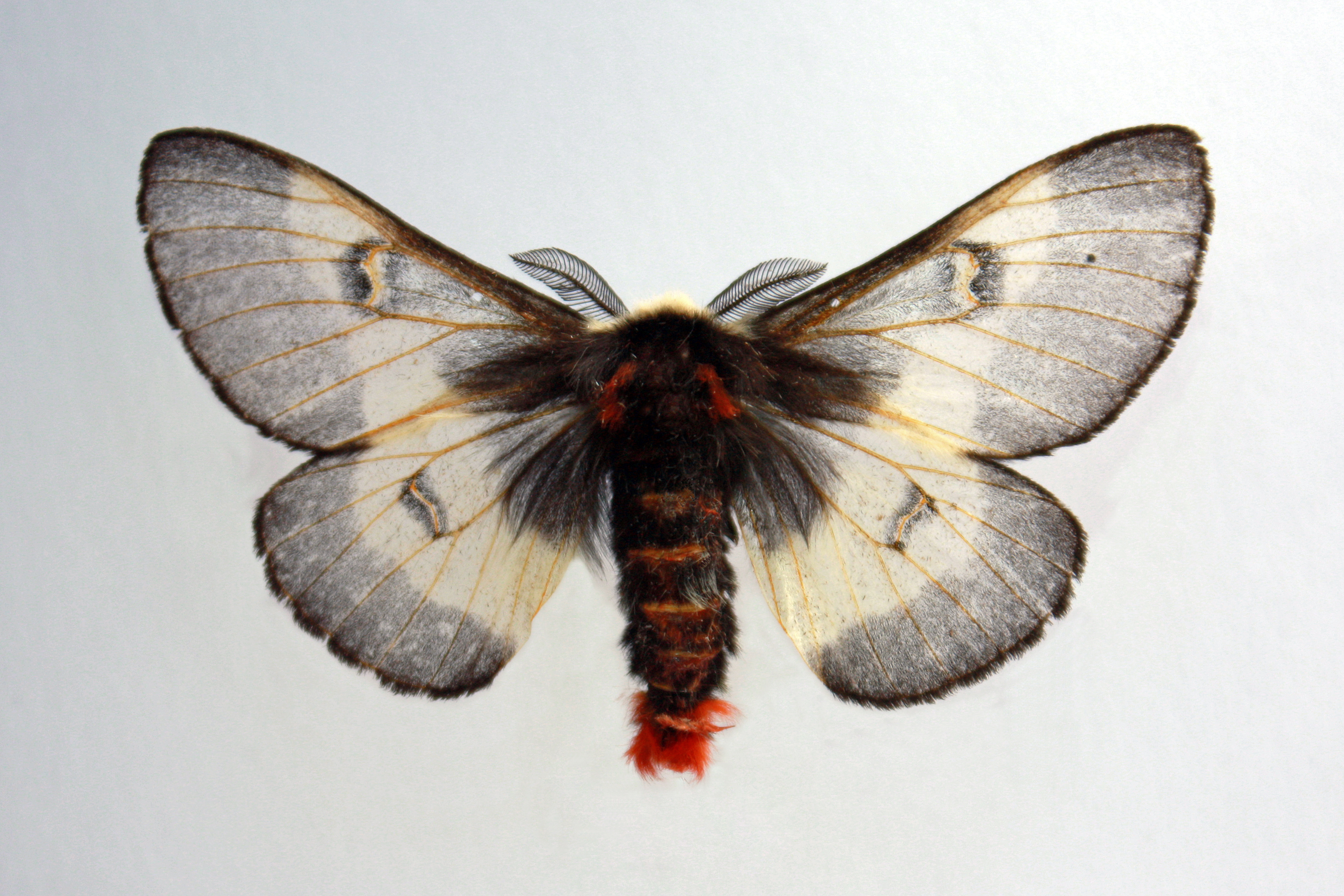
- Adult

Scientific classification
- Kingdom: Animalia
- Phylum: Arthropoda
- Clade: Pancrustacea
- Class: Insecta
- Order: Lepidoptera
- Family: Saturniidae
- Genus: Hemileuca
- Species: H. lucina

Binomial name
- Hemileuca lucina H. Edwards, 1887

Synonyms
- Hemileuca obsoleta Reiff, 1910; Hemileuca lutea Reiff, 1910

= Hemileuca lucina =

New England buck moth

Species of moth

Hemileuca lucina, the New England buck moth, is a species of moth in the family Saturniidae. This moth species is only found in the New England region of the United States. Larvae in early stages mainly feed on broadleaf meadowsweet (Spiraea latifolia) whereas larvae in later stages show variation in food sources such as blackberry and black cherry leaves. Larvae have a black body with orange/black spines on their back that are used to deter predators. Pupation occurs during the summer and adult moths come out around September.

Adult females are usually bigger than males. Both males and females have dark colored bodies and wide white bands on their wings that are similarly observed in their sister species, Hemileuca maia.

The flight season for adult Hemileuca lucina is in September and it lasts around two weeks. Females secrete a pheromone to attract the males and once they pair up, they copulate for about one to two hours. Hemileuca lucina is univoltine, meaning that it has one brood per year. Females lay eggs on the twig of their host plants that look like a tightly packed ring.

H. lucina larvae are subject to prey by wasps, stinkbugs, and certain types of spiders. There is a tachinid fly and ichneumonid wasp that are parasitoids of caterpillars as well.

== Taxonomy ==
The New England buck moth is one of the many species in genus Hemileuca and family Saturniidae. The genus Hemileuca was first named by Francis Walker in 1855. The family Saturniidae, which usually refers to giant silkworm moth or royal moth, was created by Jean Baptiste Boisduval in 1837. The New England buck moth's binomial name, Hemileuca lucina, was given by Henry Edwards in 1887. At first, this species was widely confused with Hemileuca maia (Drury, 1773) as the species' caterpillars and adult forms were nearly indistinguishable. However, subtle but noticeable differences shown in wing translucence and band width allowed separation of the species.

There are 33 known species of the genus Hemileuca. Of these 33 species, distinct species groups are formed based on larval characteristics, adult phenotype and relative food resources.

Below are the list of specific species in the maia group of genus Hemileuca.

- Hemileuca lucina (H. Edwards, 1887)
- Hemileuca maia (Drury, 1773)
- Hemileuca nevadensis (Stretch, 1872)
- Hemileuca slosseri (Peigler & Stone, 1989)

All of the maia group species reside on the east of Mississippi River and also exhibit similar appearances, making them sister species.

== Description ==
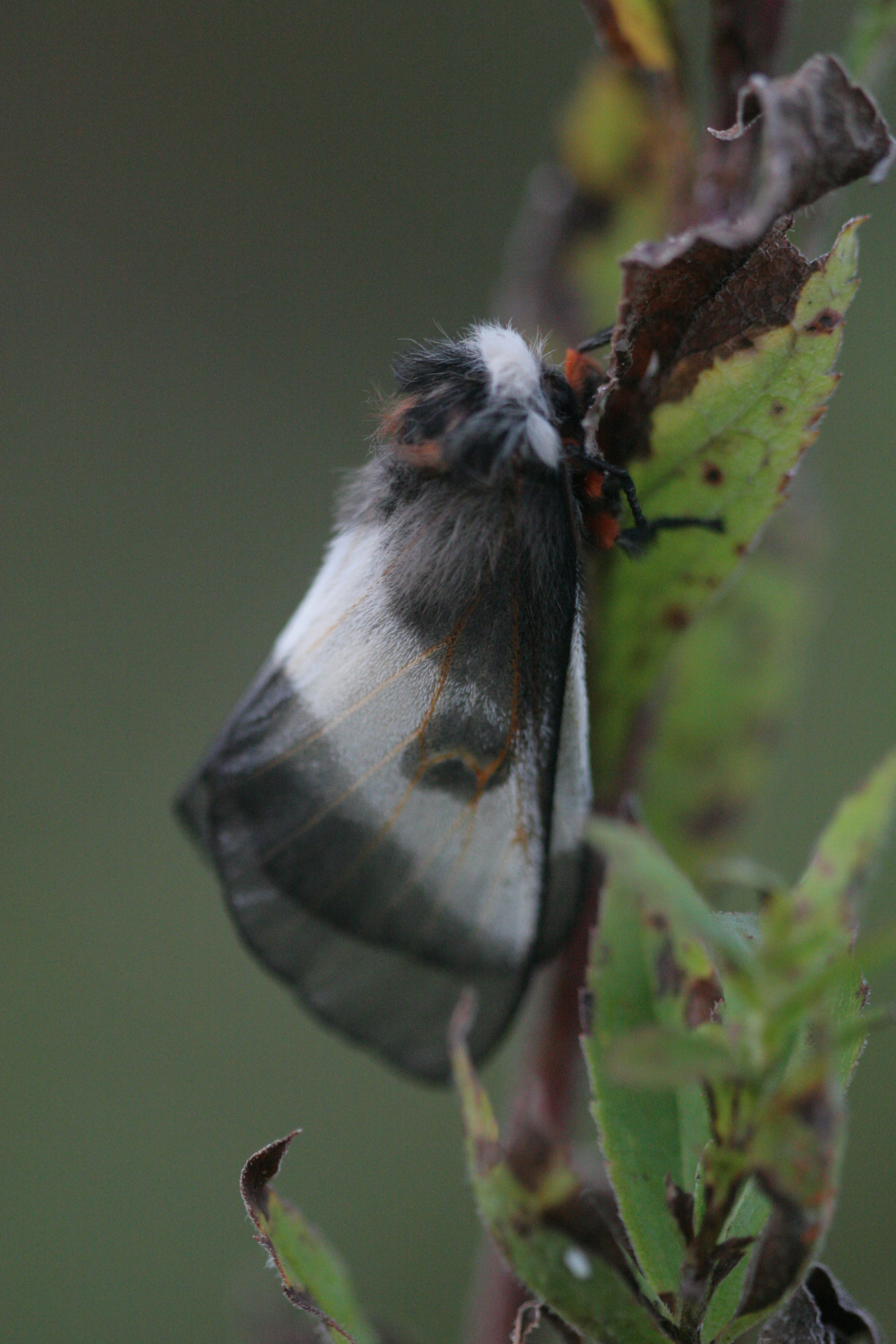
Side view

Adult females are generally larger than adult males. Males and females also have different abdominal tufts. The width of the female forewing bands range from 30 to 34 mm whereas the male forewing bands range from 23 to 28 mm. Among the species, each adult moth tends to have a different wingspan, wing translucence and band width. In general, smaller and more translucent-winged moths are observed in central Maine and larger and darker moths are observed in southern Massachusetts. This hints that moth phenotype varies and possibly depends on a variety of factors including location, temperature, etc.

Both Hemileuca lucina larvae and adult are often mistaken for that of Hemileuca maia and Hemileuca nevadensis. The early stages of Hemileuca maia larvae appear very similar to Hemileuca lucina larvae and the larvae in later stages are almost identical. Compared to Hemileuca maia larvae, Hemileuca lucina larvae are in general smaller and exhibit a sharply defined white stripe above the feet that is either faintly present or absent in H. maia larvae. For adult moths, H. maia is darker than H. lucina and also has narrower white forewing bands with circular spots. In contrast, H. nevadensis adults have wider white forewing bands that are more convex than H. lucina adults. In terms of translucence, H. nevadensis are generally more opaque.

== Distribution and habitat ==
As given by the name, the New England buck moth can be found in the New England states, specifically Maine, New Hampshire and Massachusetts. It is reported to live in wet meadows in the New England region. The species is very local and few have been found in other regions in the world. Because of this, population density is often subject to large fluctuations due to changes in the local environment. Distribution of this species is not fully understood yet due to the species' restricted habitat range compared to its host plants' range.

== Food resources ==
Early findings of larval host plants state that H. lucina caterpillars feed on broadleaf spirea and oaks but recent findings suggest that they mainly feed on meadowsweet (Spiraea latifolia). The relative age of the shrub that the caterpillars consume also influences caterpillar growth as larvae (third instar) both showed preference to new leaves and exhibited increased growth after the consumption of new leaves as compared to mature leaves. Larvae in the early instars primarily feed on meadow-sweet but larvae in later instars were also seen consuming blackberry (Rubus species), cinquefoil (Potentilla species) and black cherry.

Adult female moths are known to not feed on anything, but the general pattern of adult feeding needs more exploration.

== Parental care ==
=== Oviposition ===
Oviposition refers to a process in which animals lay eggs. Hemileuca lucina females lay eggs in batches three months after the larval developmental period, which is usually around September. Females tend to make one or very few decisions on where to deposit the eggs. This is different from other species that oviposit eggs singularly as it is known that they make hundreds of decisions on where to oviposit the eggs, when to oviposit the eggs, etc. The flight time of Hemileuca lucina is about two weeks during September and they lay eggs once a year (univoltine). Hemileuca lucina females expand their wings, which is often seen as a signal for hormone production. The hormone is used to attract males and once males are with females, they copulate for about one to two hours. The host plant in which females oviposit eggs is called Spiraea latifolia and they usually lay one or two batches of eggs on the stem of the host plant.

Females use their abdomen and shift it left and right around the twig and start laying eggs in a half-circle. At first, these half-circles of eggs are nearly empty, lacking any form. Females then re-crawl up the twig to fill in the gaps, which makes the batch of eggs look like a long ring. These eggs overwinter and hatch around May. Local weather conditions are one of the known factors that can change the hatching period. It was also observed that females preferred the periphery of the twig for their oviposition location as sunlight was more abundant compared to the inner side. Shady regions were avoided for most of the females but the reason is not fully understood.

== Social behavior ==
=== Caterpillar sociality ===
Larval response to predators or other harmful factors are mainly defense or escape. Defense takes on multiple forms, as larvae thrash, bite and regurgitate when near predators. Such defensive behavior is mostly seen in larvae of the first three instars. Aggregation behavior can be explained by the early instar larvae's tendency to group together to defend themselves against predators. Once larvae enter the fourth instar however, they show escape behaviors as most larvae are in solitary phase. Escape behavior also takes on multiple forms as larvae drops from the host plant to the ground or cringe and curl tightly on the plant. As a result of escaping, late instar larvae tended to disperse rather than aggregate.

== Life cycle ==
=== Eggs ===
An average of 146 eggs are laid per batch. Each egg weighs around 1.63 mg and ranges from 1.13 to 1.89 mg. The specific time in which the eggs are laid does not seem to determine larval fitness. Similarly, the range of egg weight seems insignificant as there is no known information on whether or not quality/health of larvae depends on egg weight. However, female age seems to control egg weight, as the weights declined as females aged. The eggs hatch in May.

=== Larvae ===
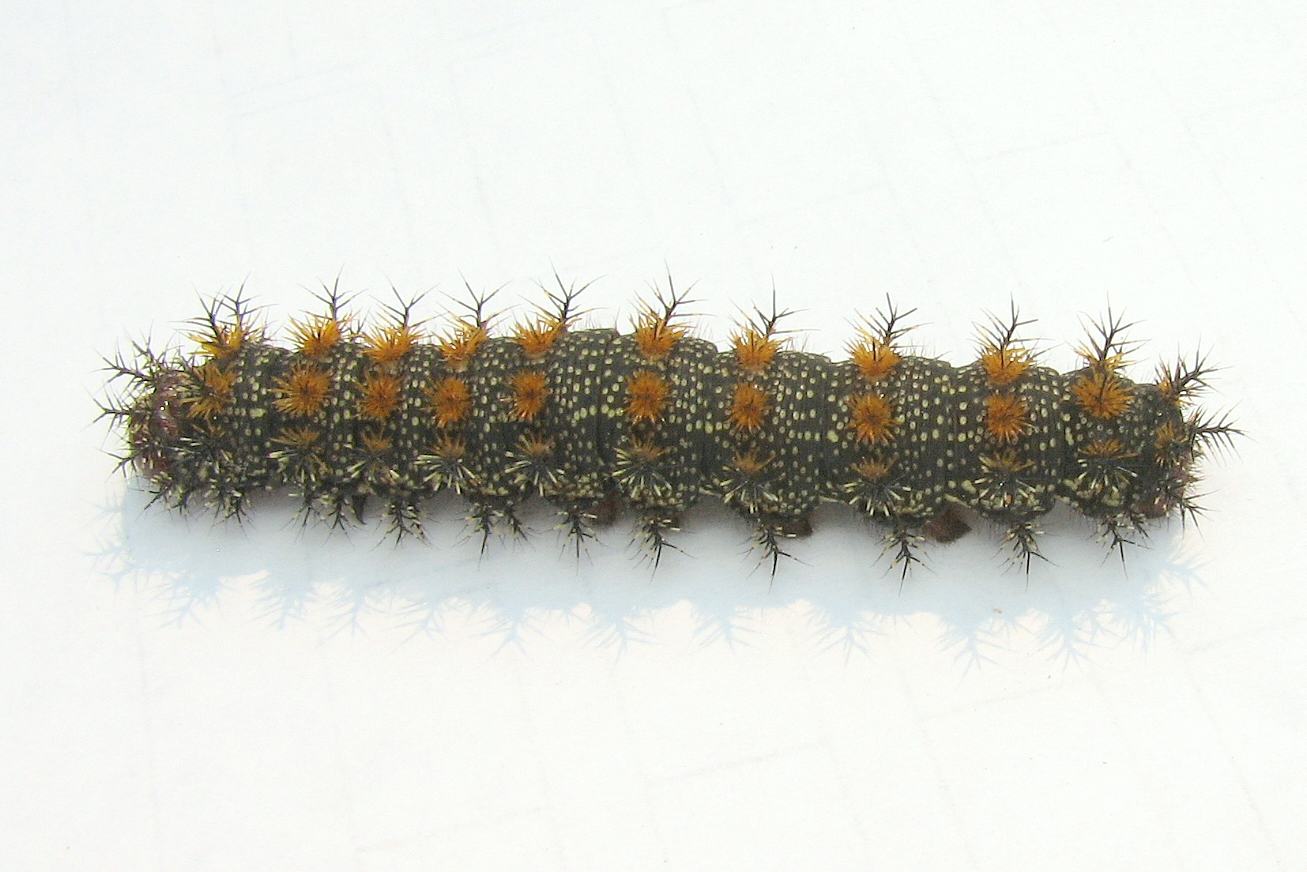
Larva

Generation for Hemileuca lucina larvae starts around May and lasts until July. Larvae are black and have spines on their back that are black and orange. These spines can cause pain through dermatitis when handled improperly. During the first four instars, larvae show gregarious behaviors as they move in clumps. Group size tends to decrease over time due to various factors including weather, predators, parasitoids, food availability, etc. During the fourth and fifth instars, most larvae show solitary behavior. During the sixth instar, larvae are completely solitary and display yellow stripes on their back.

=== Pupa ===
During this stage, larvae move away from the host plant and burrow into the ground for pupation. The pupa resides in the soil for the entire summer until September.

=== Adult ===
Adult New England buck moths usually emerge in the morning, faster than its sister species, Hemileuca maia. Flight season is about two weeks long for adult moths. Flight usually occurs in September but, depending on weather conditions, it often occurs in October. Males are known to fly in the late morning and mating occurs around 10:00 am – 1:00 pm. After copulating for about two hours, females find host plants for oviposition.

== Enemies ==
=== Predators ===
Few predators of Hemileuca lucina larvae have been reported, including wasps, stinkbugs and orb-weaving spiders. Specifically, vespid wasps (Polistes dominula and Polistes fuscatus) have shown to prey upon H. lucina caterpillars that are masticated and given to wasp larvae as nutritional sources. It was observed that wasps attack one member of the group rather than attacking multiple larvae at the same time but the specific method of wasp predation requires further investigation. Moreover, H. lucina larvae's spines are known to be ineffective against some social wasps (P. dominulus and P. fuscatus) as they are able to bite off the spines before masticating the larvae. Stinkbugs such as Podisus maculiventris are also reported predators of gregarious caterpillars like H. lucina, but their interaction with the caterpillars are rarely observed due to low numbers of stinkbugs in the spring. It has been observed that adult moths are attracted to three species of araneid spiders and their webs. The specific cause behind the moth's attraction to these webs is not known but pheromone mimicry seems to be the widely used strategy in these spiders.

=== Parasites ===
There are few notable parasites of Hemileuca lucina caterpillars including tachinid fly (Compsilura concinnata) and ichneumonid wasp (Ichneumonidae - Hyposoter fugitivus), both of which are not H. lucina specific parasites. Of these two, C. concinnata is responsible for mortality of H. lucina caterpillars as 30% mortality was found in Massachusetts. Even though C. concinnata is a major cause of H. lucina caterpillar mortality, its predation is not specific to H. lucina caterpillars as 36% mortality on Hemileuca maia was found in southern Massachusetts. It was observed that C. concinnata attacks each H. lucina caterpillar aggregation and ultimately lays live larvae in the host. The specific mechanism in which the tachinid fly lays the larvae needs further investigation. It was also found that the tachinid fly's attack triggers H. lucina caterpillars to separate from the aggregation by dropping off the host plant or inducing solitary status. In both cases, the tachinid fly then had an advantage to prey on the separated larvae that fails to rejoin the aggregation. Similarly, ichneumonid wasps do not only parasitize on H. lucina as there are reported incidents of H. maia getting parasitized.

== Defense mechanisms ==
Defense mechanisms refer to ways in which an organism protects itself from dangers caused by enemies. Various lepidopteran larvae are known to have urticating spines or stinging hairs that contain venoms. Not all chemical components of the venom have been identified but it is currently known that histamine or histamine-like substances are parts of the venom. These urticating spines and hairs that serve as protectors for these larvae could have evolutionarily developed as those free of such spines and hairs were easily preyed on. Even if the spines do not contain venoms, they still serve to protect larvae as physical barriers from small invertebrate predators. Painful stings and swellings are noted results that are inflicted by Hemileuca lucina's spines. Other than the spines or hairs, aposematic larvae often use regurgitation as an alternative deterrent method. Acquisition of multiple defense mechanisms are especially beneficial as it not only maximizes protection but it also allows matching a certain type of defense to specific predators/parasites.

== Mating ==
Males will fly during the late morning, with mating occurring during the late morning and into the early afternoon. H. lucina females use a pheromone to attract males. Once male and female adults meet, copulation occurs. The mated pairs remain copulated for about 2 hours. After separation, females look for an oviposition site and lay eggs in their most preferable spot. It has been found that H. lucina males do not have the ability to discern pheromones secreted by H. lucina and H. nevadensis, often resulting in interspecific mating.
