= Spiraea hispanica =

Spiraea hispanica can refer to the following plant species:

- Spiraea hispanica Barrelier ex Zabel, a synonym of Spiraea hypericifolia L. subsp. obovata (Waldst. & Kit. ex Willd.) H.Huber
- Spiraea hispanica Ortega, a synonym of Spiraea hypericifolia L. subsp. obovata (Waldst. & Kit. ex Willd.) H.Huber
- Spiraea hispanica Ortega ex C.Vicioso, a synonym of Spiraea hypericifolia L. subsp. obovata (Waldst. & Kit. ex Willd.) H.Huber
- Spiraea hispanica (Willd.) Hoffmanns. & Link, a synonym of Spiraea media Schmidt var. media
