= Hemileuca peigleri =

Scientific classification
- Kingdom: Animalia
- Phylum: Arthropoda
- Class: Insecta
- Order: Lepidoptera
- Family: Saturniidae
- Genus: Hemileuca
- Species: H. peigleri

Binomial name
- Hemileuca peigleri Lemaire, 1981

Species of moth

Hemileuca peigleri, the Texas buck moth, is a moth in the family Saturniidae.

== Description ==
The male abdomen is black with a red tip, and the female abdomen is solid black. Their wings are almost transparent, with the upper side of the wing being gray with narrow black borders and a black wing base. Each wing has a wide white band with a small eyespot. Their wingspan ranges from 5.8 – 8.2 cm.

== Range ==
Their range covers central Texas.

== Habitat ==
Their habitat consists of oak-covered hills.

== Ecology ==
Adult moths of this species do not feed. Female Texas buck moths fly 10–20 feet above the ground within oak trees while males fly near the ground.

Hosts of the Texas buck moth include Texas live oak (Quercus fusiformis), Havard's oak (Q. havardii), Shumard's oak (Q. shumardii), and Nuttall oak (Q. texana).

== Taxonomy ==
Hemileuca peigleri is at times considered a subspecies of Hemileuca maia, but many authors consider it its own species.
