= Spiraea sibirica =

Spiraea sibirica can refer to the following plant species:

- Spiraea sibirica Raf., a synonym of Spiraea salicifolia L. var. salicifolia
- Spiraea sibirica Zabel, a synonym of Spiraea hypericifolia L. subsp. hypericifolia
