= Serica mckenziei =

Scientific classification
- Kingdom: Animalia
- Phylum: Arthropoda
- Class: Insecta
- Order: Coleoptera
- Suborder: Polyphaga
- Infraorder: Scarabaeiformia
- Family: Scarabaeidae
- Genus: Serica
- Species: S. mckenziei

Binomial name
- Serica mckenziei Saylor, 1935

Species of beetle

Serica mckenziei is a species of beetle of the family Scarabaeidae. It is found in the United States (California).

== Life history ==
Adults have been recorded feeding on Eriogonum fasciculatum and the flowers of Adenostoma fasciculatum.
