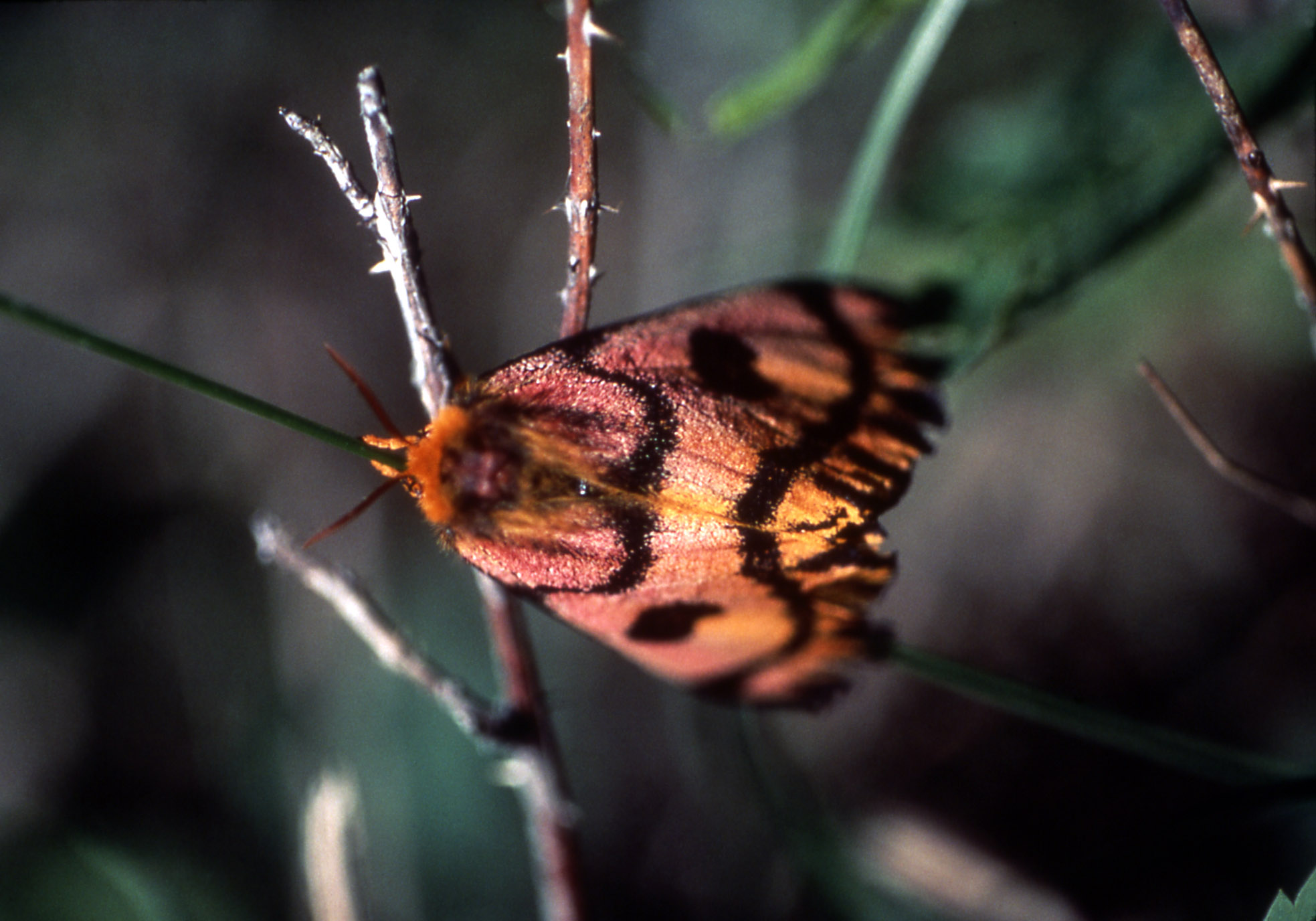

Scientific classification
- Kingdom: Animalia
- Phylum: Arthropoda
- Clade: Pancrustacea
- Class: Insecta
- Order: Lepidoptera
- Family: Saturniidae
- Genus: Hemileuca
- Species: H. eglanterina

Binomial name
- Hemileuca eglanterina Boisduval, 1852

= Sheep moth =

Species of moth

The sheep moth, or common sheep moth (Hemileuca eglanterina), is a member of the family Saturniidae of silk moths and is native to western North America. In California, its range is west of the Sierran crest and the mountains of Southern California, ranging near to the coast. The moth is dayflying and appears in summer. It feeds on plants of three genera: Ceanothus, Rhamnus (including coffeeberry), and Rosa. Nuttall's sheep moth and one other species are similar, occurring in sagebrush areas east of the Sierra Nevada. The species was first described by Jean Baptiste Boisduval in 1852.

The sheep moth has a 5.5-8.5 centimeter wingspan and a relatively slender body. Its forewings are pink with a yellow streak in the middle and the hindwings are yellowish with variable black markings. There is an all-black form near Mount Shasta. The larvae are black with branched yellowish spines that become orange in later development and an orange-brown head.

== Gallery ==
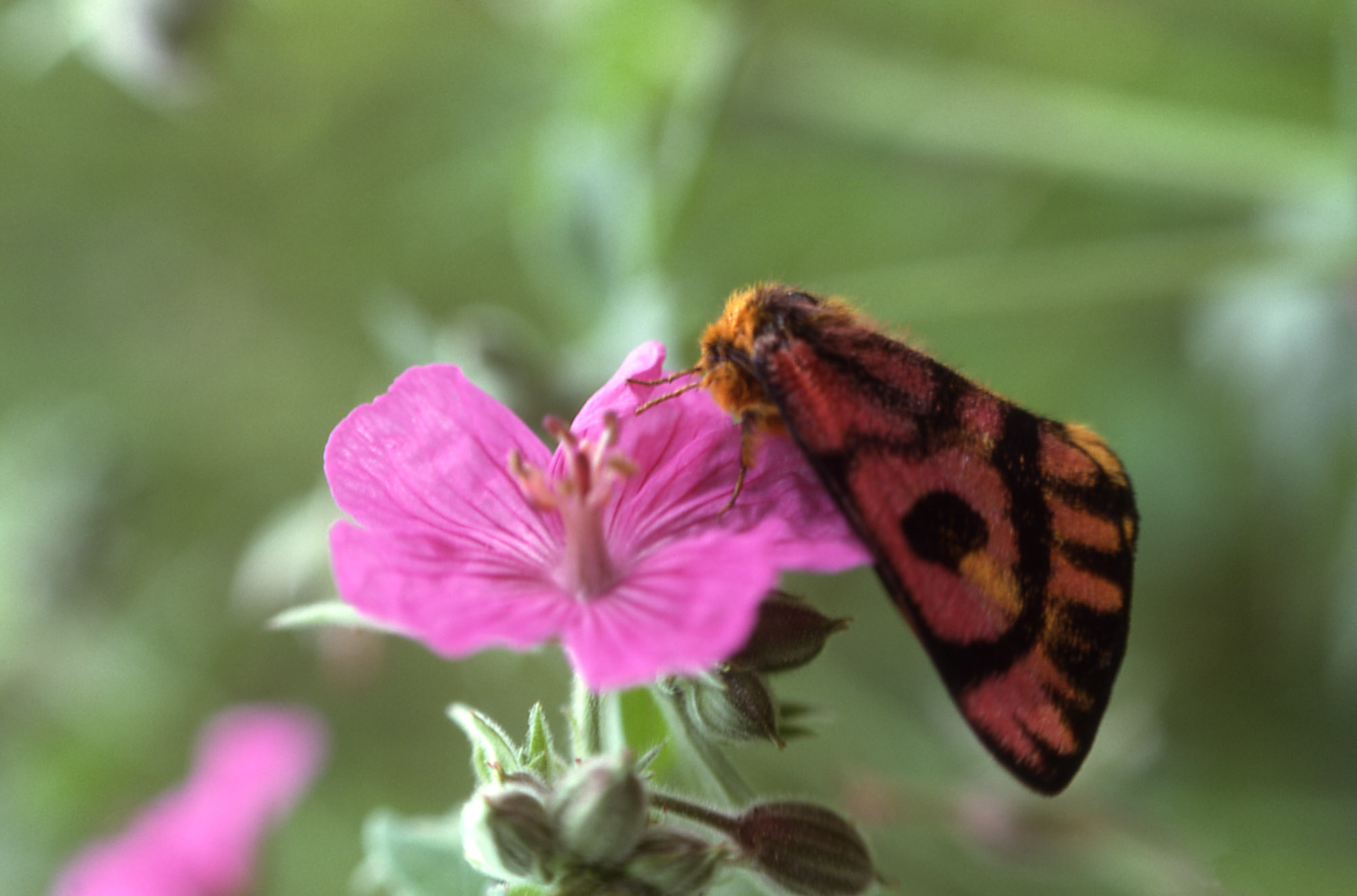
Adult on flower

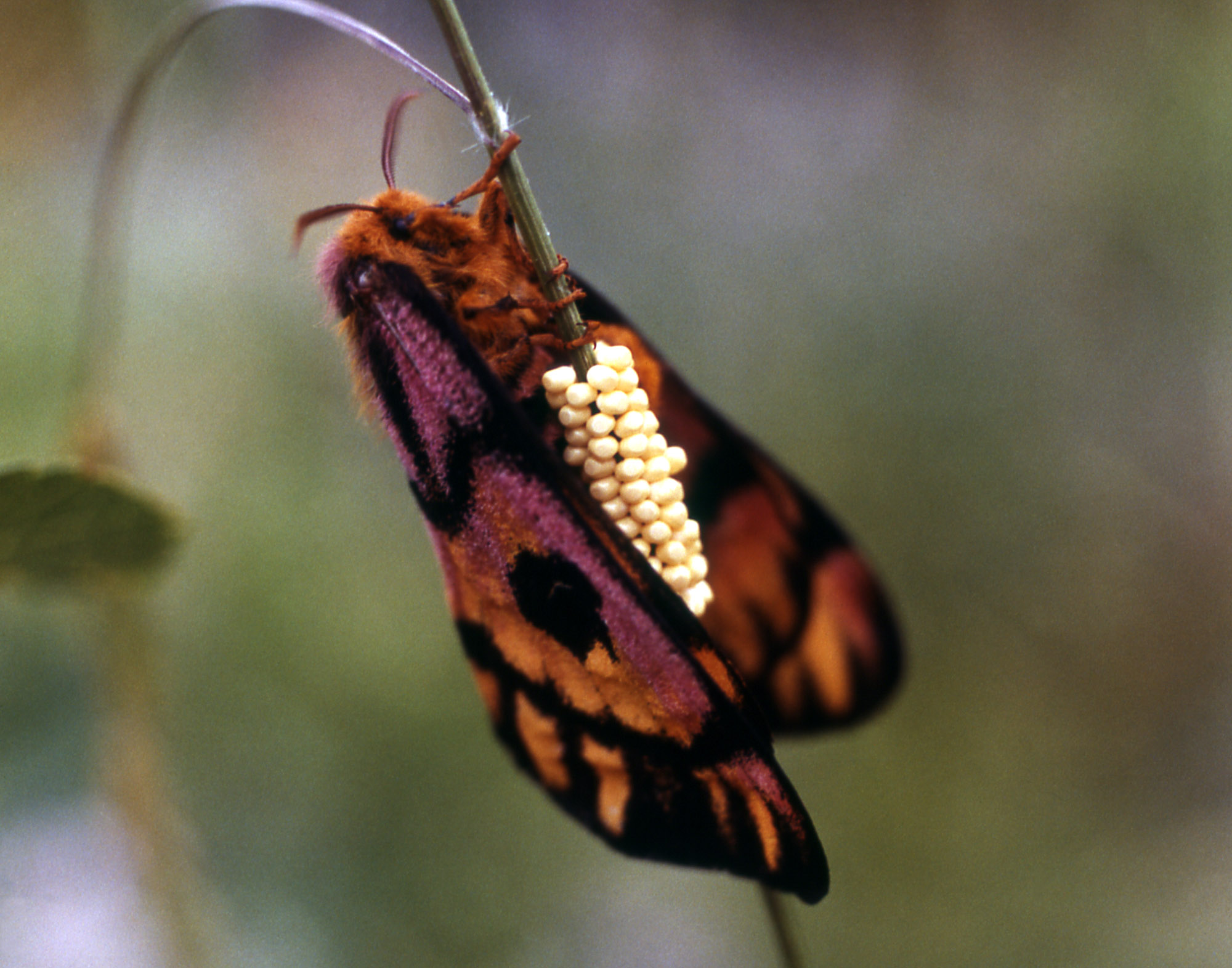
Adult laying eggs

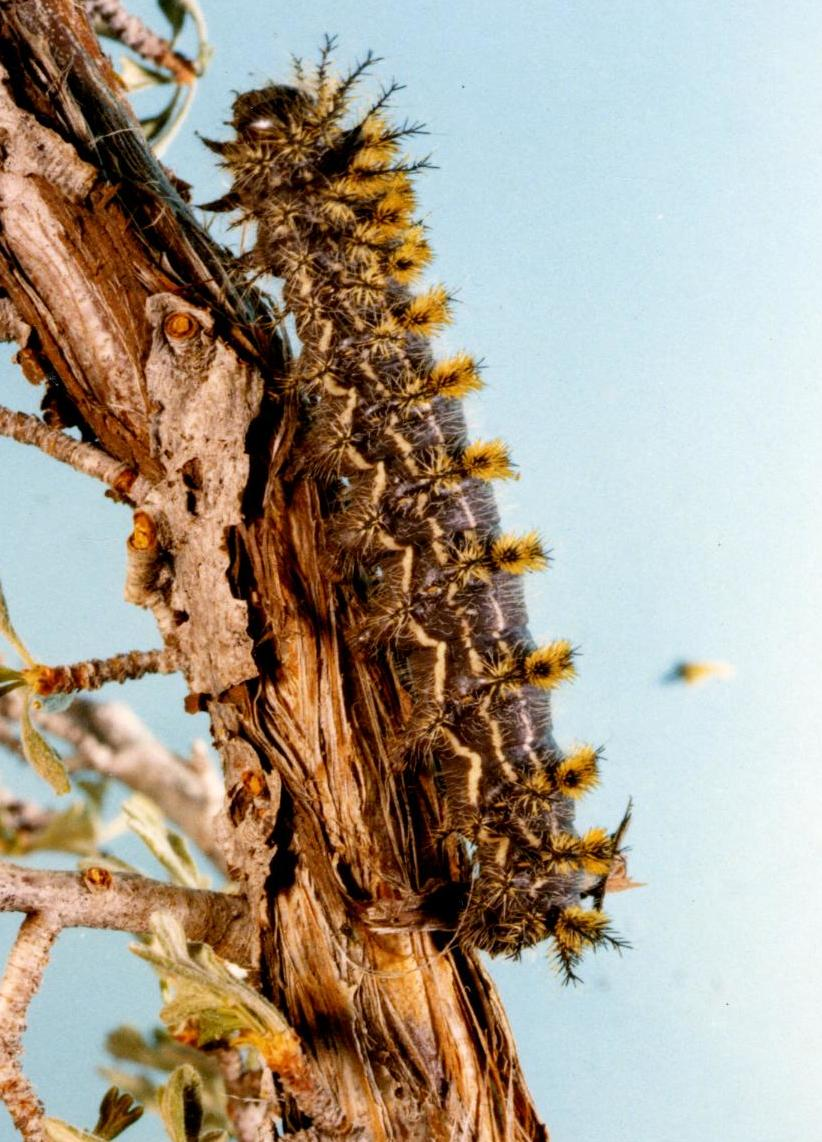
Caterpillar larva on bitterbrush.
