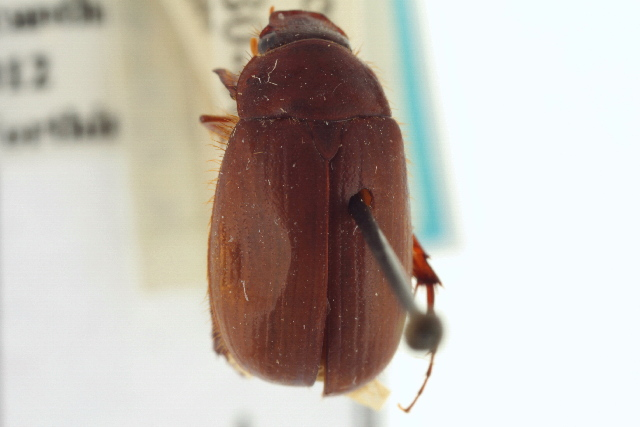

Scientific classification
- Kingdom: Animalia
- Phylum: Arthropoda
- Class: Insecta
- Order: Coleoptera
- Suborder: Polyphaga
- Infraorder: Scarabaeiformia
- Family: Scarabaeidae
- Genus: Serica
- Species: S. heteracantha

Binomial name
- Serica heteracantha Dawson, 1967

= Serica heteracantha =

Species of beetle

Serica heteracantha is a species of beetle of the family Scarabaeidae. It is found in the United States (California).

== Description ==
Adults reach a length of about 8 mm. The colour is light golden brown, dulled by a grey pollen, most noticeable on the elytra.

== Life history ==
Adults have been recorded feeding on the flowers of Eriogonum fasciculatum and the flowers of Adenostoma fasciculatum.
