= Hemileuca griffini =

Scientific classification
- Kingdom: Animalia
- Phylum: Arthropoda
- Class: Insecta
- Order: Lepidoptera
- Family: Saturniidae
- Subfamily: Hemileucinae
- Genus: Hemileuca
- Species: H. griffini

Binomial name
- Hemileuca griffini Tuskes, 1978

Species of moth

Hemileuca griffini, known generally as the Griffin's sheepmoth or Canadian fleabane moth, is a species of insect in the family Saturniidae. It is found in North America.

The MONA or Hodges number for Hemileuca griffini is 7740.
