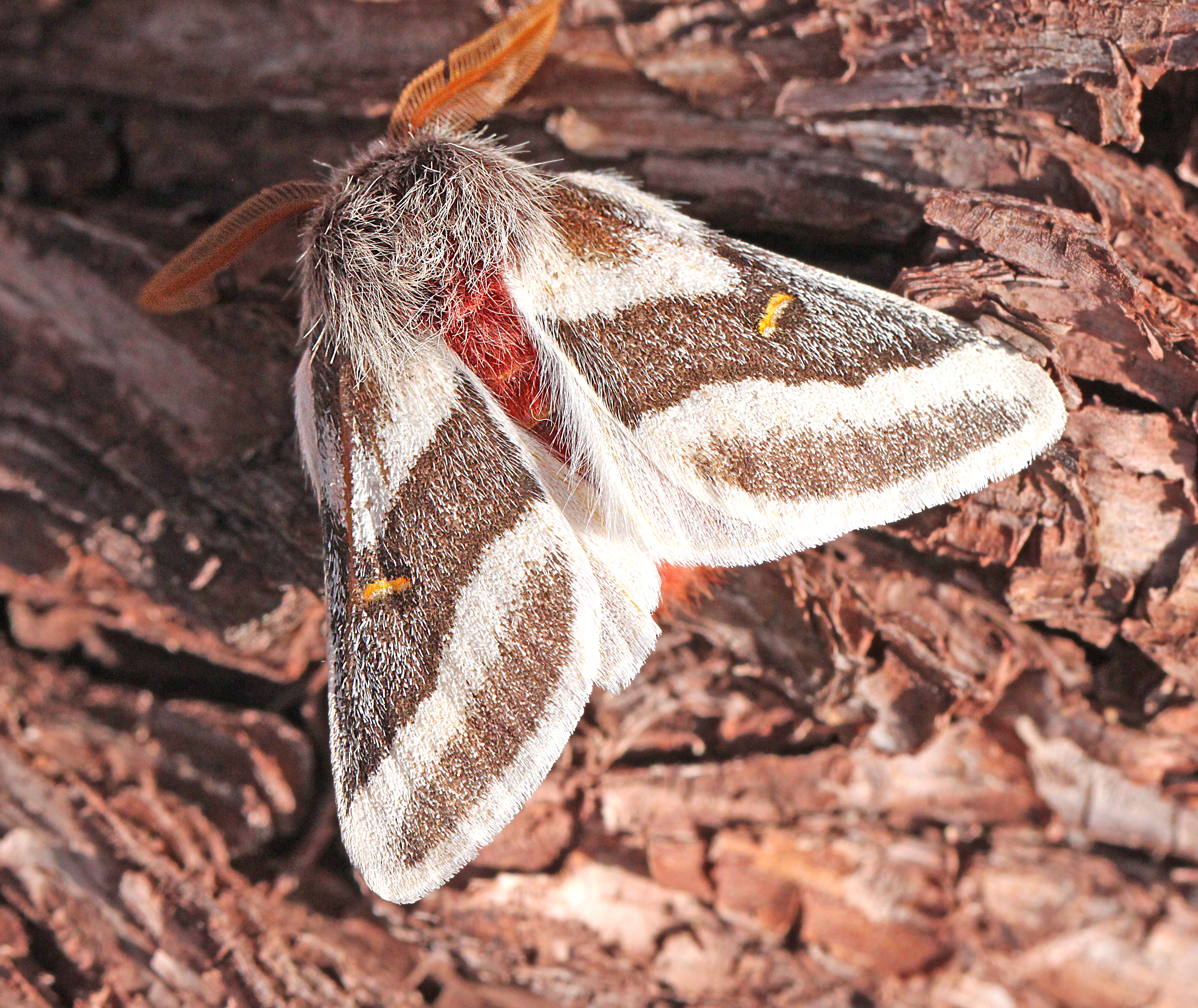

Scientific classification
- Kingdom: Animalia
- Phylum: Arthropoda
- Clade: Pancrustacea
- Class: Insecta
- Order: Lepidoptera
- Family: Saturniidae
- Genus: Hemileuca
- Species: H. tricolor

Binomial name
- Hemileuca tricolor (Packard, 1872)

= Tricolor buckmoth =

Species of moth

Hemileuca tricolor, the tricolor buckmoth, is a moth in the silkworm family Saturniidae. It is native mainly to the Sonoran Desert of the southwestern United States, including southern Arizona, southwestern New Mexico, and Mexico.

== Adult description ==
This species is sexually dimorphic, and the males are smaller and lighter in color than the females. Wingspan is between 2 1/8 and 3 1/8 inches (5.2 - 7.8 cm). The forewing is gray with a marginal, median, and postmedian white band, and a central yellow or orange eyespot. The hindwing in males is white and in females white to dull brown. The abdomen is red to reddish brown.

== Food and host plants ==
Larval host plants include littleleaf palo verde (Cercidium microphyllum), mesquite (Prosopis juliflora), and catclaw mesquite (Acacia greggii). Adults do not feed.

== Life cycle ==
Eggs are deposited on host plant and hatch in July, after which the caterpillars feed until pupating. They then overwinter as pupae and emerge in January. There is one flight per year, from January through April.
