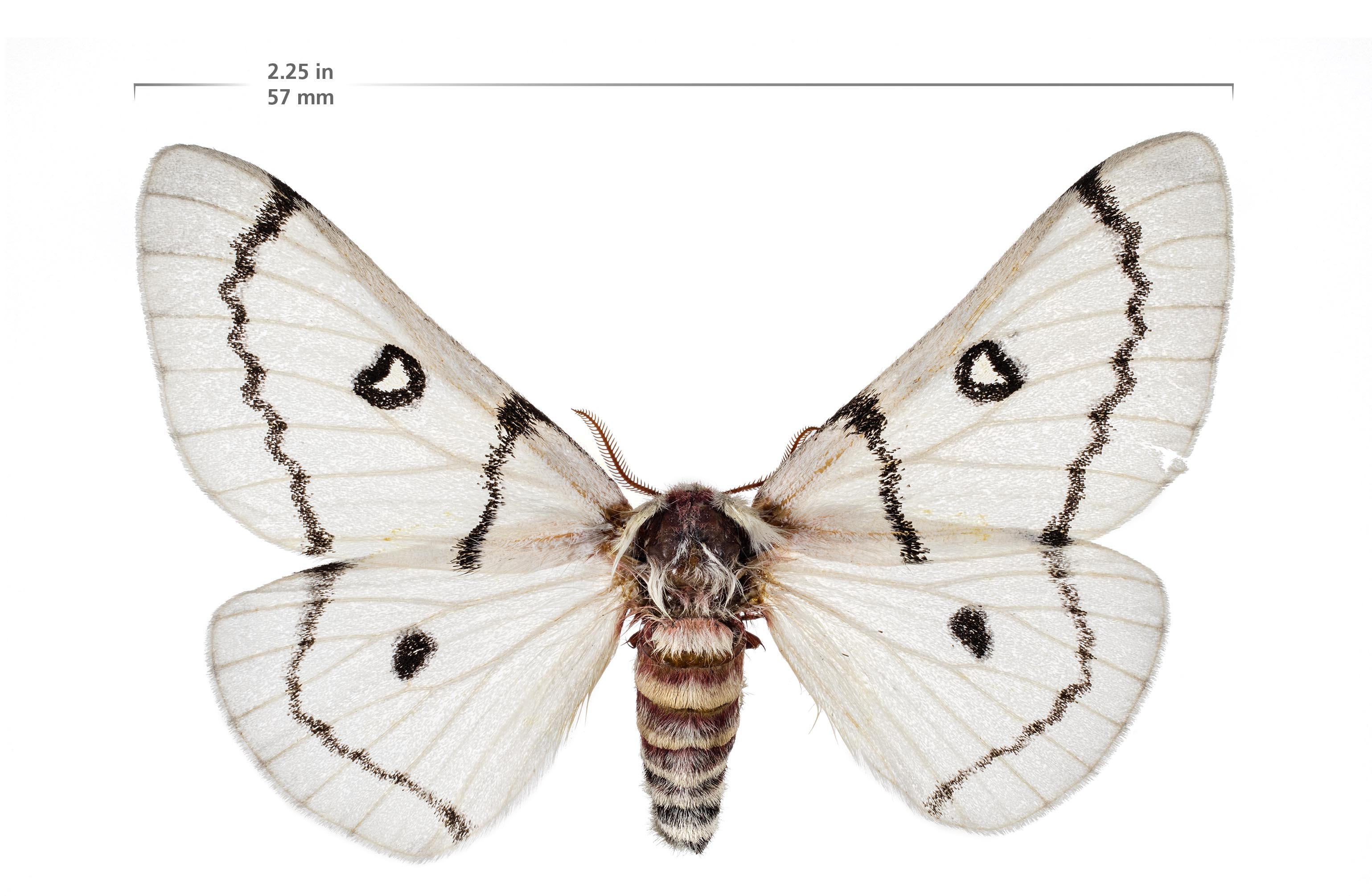

Scientific classification
- Kingdom: Animalia
- Phylum: Arthropoda
- Class: Insecta
- Order: Lepidoptera
- Family: Saturniidae
- Subfamily: Hemileucinae
- Genus: Hemileuca
- Species: H. burnsi

Binomial name
- Hemileuca burnsi J. H. Watson, 1910

= Hemileuca burnsi =

Species of moth

Hemileuca burnsi, the Burns' buckmoth, is a species of insect in the family Saturniidae. It is found in North America.

The MONA or Hodges number for Hemileuca burnsi is 7737.
