= Hemileuca grotei =

Scientific classification
- Kingdom: Animalia
- Phylum: Arthropoda
- Class: Insecta
- Order: Lepidoptera
- Family: Saturniidae
- Subfamily: Hemileucinae
- Genus: Hemileuca
- Species: H. grotei

Binomial name
- Hemileuca grotei Grote & Robinson, 1868

Species of moth

Hemileuca grotei, or Grote's buck moth, is a species of insect in the family Saturniidae. It is found in North America.

The MONA or Hodges number for Hemileuca grotei is 7733.

== Subspecies ==
These two subspecies belong to the species Hemileuca grotei:

- Hemileuca grotei diana Packard, 1874
- Hemileuca grotei grotei Grote & Robinson, 1868
