= Hemileuca slosseri =

Scientific classification
- Domain: Eukaryota
- Kingdom: Animalia
- Phylum: Arthropoda
- Class: Insecta
- Order: Lepidoptera
- Family: Saturniidae
- Genus: Hemileuca
- Species: H. slosseri

Binomial name
- Hemileuca slosseri Peigler & Stone, 1989

Species of moth

Hemileuca slosseri, the nit-grass moth or Slosser's buckmoth, is a species of moth in the family Saturniidae. It was described by Richard S. Peigler and Stephen E. Stone in 1989 and is found in North America.

The MONA or Hodges number for Hemileuca slosseri is 7744.4.
