= Hemileuca sandra =

Scientific classification
- Kingdom: Animalia
- Phylum: Arthropoda
- Clade: Pancrustacea
- Class: Insecta
- Order: Lepidoptera
- Family: Saturniidae
- Genus: Hemileuca
- Species: H. sandra

Binomial name
- Hemileuca sandra Pavulaan, 2020

Species of moth

Hemileuca sandra, the eastern buckmoth, is a species in the family Saturniidae.

== Description ==
As with other allies (e.g. Hemileuca maia etc), the female tends to be larger than the male, where the males can be distinguished by their similar black abdomens instead having a red tip. As for others, in both sexes the upperside of all wings are creamy white with black edges, each wing has "eyes" or black dots.

== Taxonomy ==
These eastern buckmoths were originally described as a subspecies Hemileuca maia sandra Pavulaan, 2020. This followed from findings by Pavulaan, 2020(b) to indicate some important distinction between various former populations of Hemileuca maia (Drury, 1773) under a broader former concept of the eastern buckmoth which is still adopted in several initiatives, e.g. NatureServe. The historical concepts were redefined to claim the core populations linked to the original taxon name (i.e. nominotypical populations tied to the earliest historical concept) should be restricted to populations around New York, in the Long Island Pine Barrens. Those were redefined as Hemileuca maia maia (Drury, 1773), broadly as those from Coastal barrens (Cape Cod-Long Island), while other former populations from diverse localities were instead assigned to different subspecies. However, several of those proposed subspecies have been since been relisted elsewhere as a valid species, after comments in Pohl & Nanz, 2023

== Distribution ==
They are found in many Eastern regions of the USA, such as West Virginia and North Carolina, with the reference specimen from New Jersey.

== Life cycle ==
Similar to other species in the genus.
