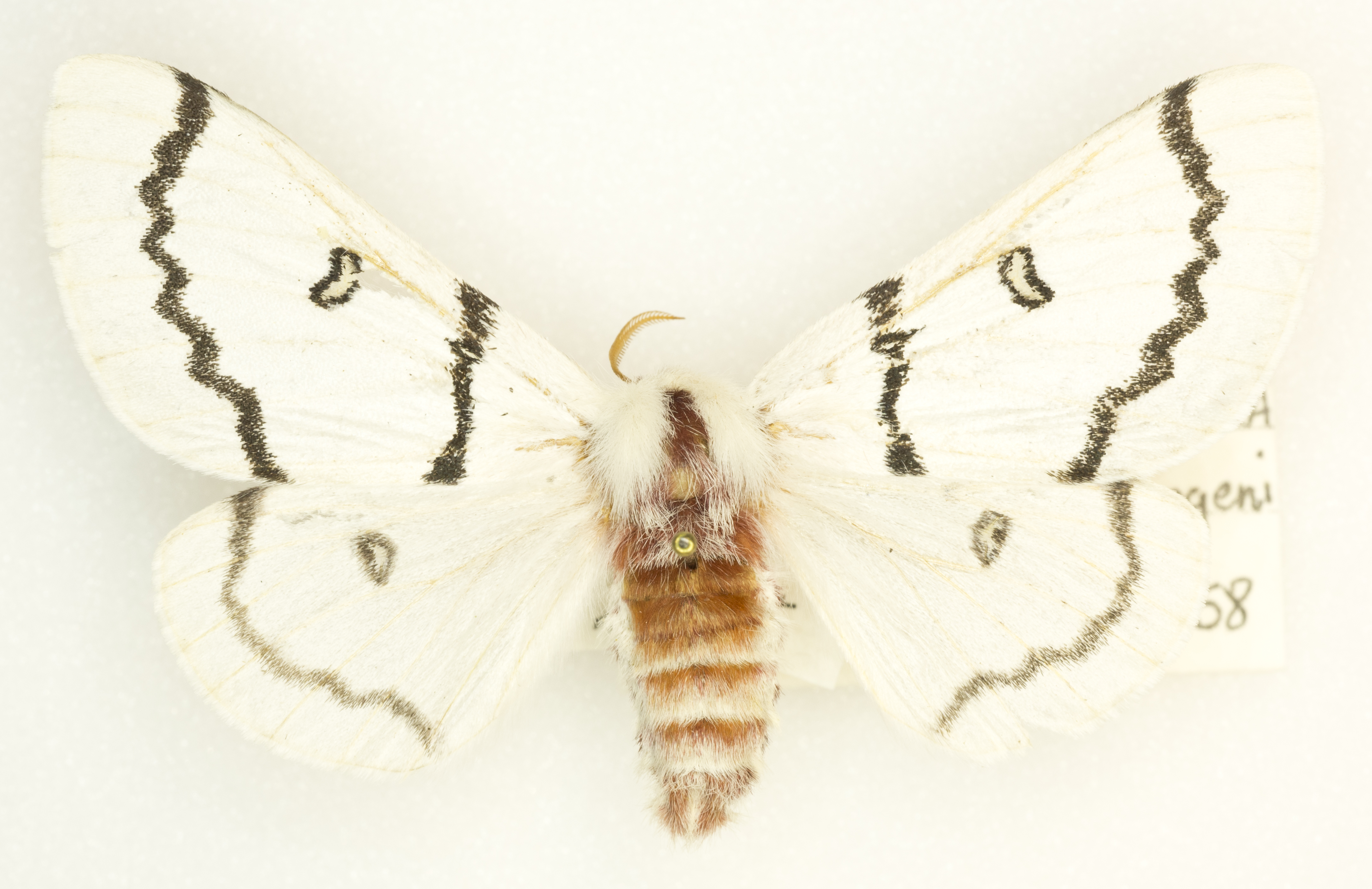

Scientific classification
- Kingdom: Animalia
- Phylum: Arthropoda
- Class: Insecta
- Order: Lepidoptera
- Family: Saturniidae
- Subfamily: Hemileucinae
- Genus: Hemileuca
- Species: H. neumoegeni

Binomial name
- Hemileuca neumoegeni H. Edwards, 1881

= Hemileuca neumoegeni =

Species of moth

Hemileuca neumoegeni, or Neumoegen's buckmoth, is a species of insect in the family Saturniidae. It is found in North America.
