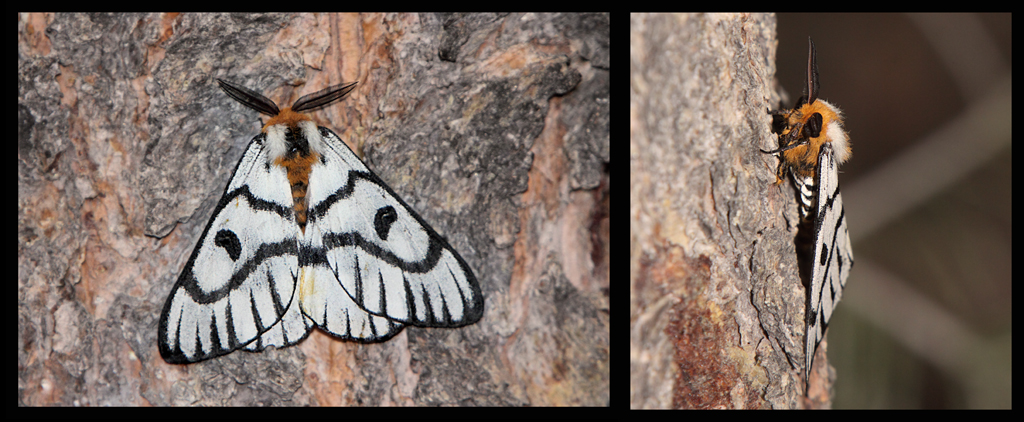

Scientific classification
- Kingdom: Animalia
- Phylum: Arthropoda
- Class: Insecta
- Order: Lepidoptera
- Family: Saturniidae
- Genus: Hemileuca
- Species: H. hera

Binomial name
- Hemileuca hera Harris, 1841

Synonyms
- Saturnia hera; Hemileuca pica; Hera chrysocarena

= Hemileuca hera =

Species of moth

Hemileuca hera, the sagebrush sheep moth or Hera buckmoth, is a moth of the family Saturniidae. The species was first described by Thaddeus William Harris in 1841. It is found in North America from southern Saskatchewan west to British Columbia, south to Arizona and New Mexico.

The wingspan is 71–93 mm. Adults are on wing from July to September depending on the location.

The larvae of Hemileuca hera hera feed on Artemisia tridentata, A. tripartita, Lupinus and Eriogonum. The larvae of Hemileuca hera marcata feed on A. tridentata.

== Subspecies ==
- Hemileuca hera hera (Great Basin)
- Hemileuca hera marcata (Southern Oregon)
