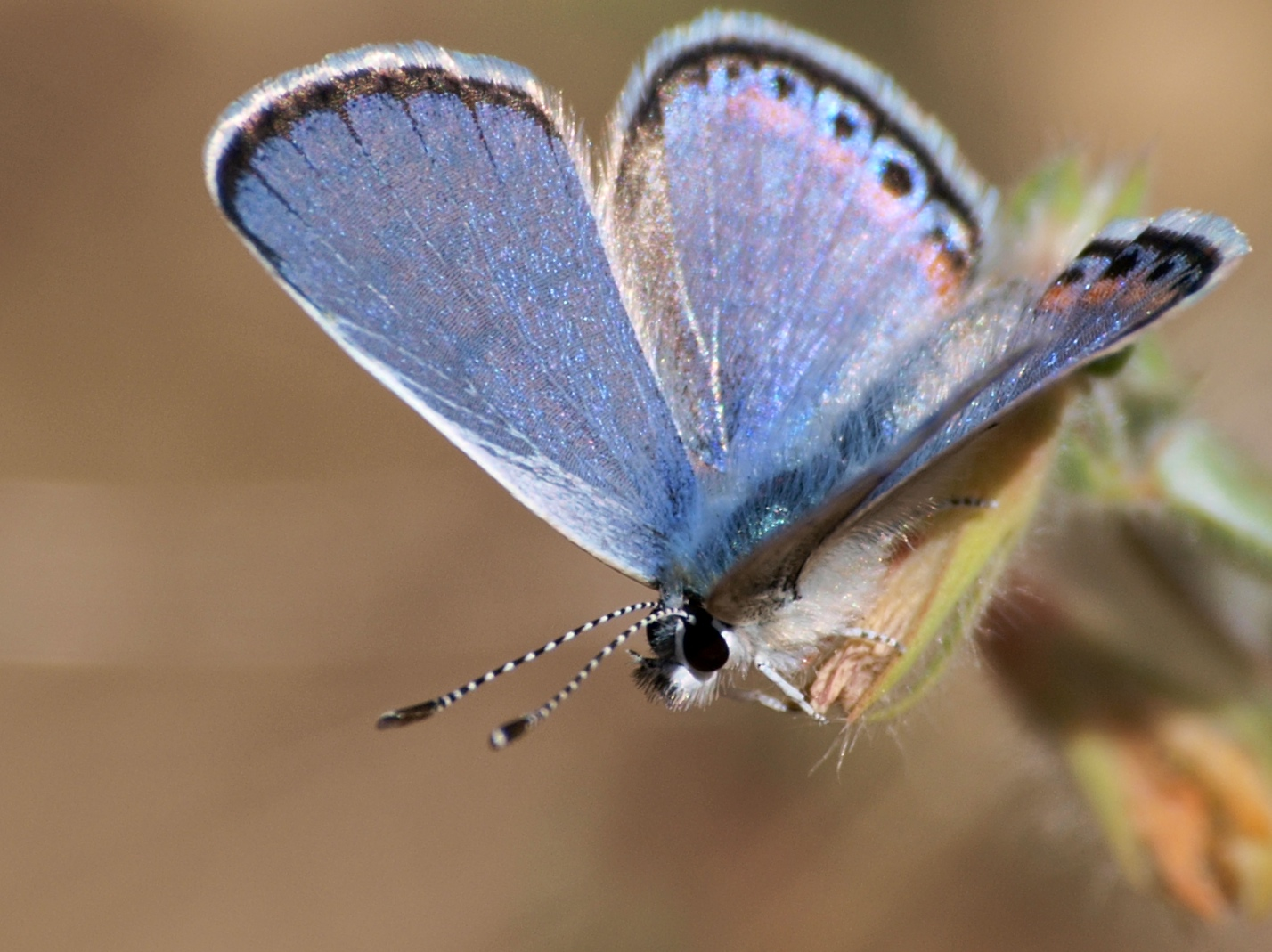

Scientific classification
- Kingdom: Animalia
- Phylum: Arthropoda
- Clade: Pancrustacea
- Class: Insecta
- Order: Lepidoptera
- Family: Lycaenidae
- Genus: Icaricia
- Species: I. lupini

Binomial name
- Icaricia lupini (Boisduval, 1869)

Synonyms
- Lycaena lupini Boisduval, 1869; Plebejus lupini (Boisduval, 1869); Aricia lupini (Boisduval, 1869)

= Icaricia lupini =

Lupine blue

Species of butterfly

Icaricia lupini, the lupine blue, is a species of butterfly in the subfamily Polyommatinae of the family Lycaenidae. It is found from south-western Canada, south through much of mountainous and intermountain western United States and high plains to northern Mexico.

== Description ==
The wingspan ranges from 17–29 mm across various sources.

== Life history & ecology ==
The eggs are laid on or near the flowers of their host plants, which the larvae proceed to eat the fruits, flowers, seeds, and leaves of; despite their common name, their host plants are buckwheat species in the genus Eriogonum, such as Eriogonum umbellatum and Eriogonum fasciculatum. They survive winter by undergoing hibernal diapause in the L2 instar.

Adults feed on the flower nectar of several genera, including their buckwheat hosts, composites, and onions. Across most of its range, there are several generations of adults from March to July. Adults are on wing in one generation from June to August in the Sierra Nevada of eastern California, June to July on the Canadian Prairies, May to August in British Columbia, May to September in Colorado, and from May to August in Washington and Oregon.

== Subspecies ==
More recent taxonomic treatments include the following subspecies:

- Icaricia lupini lupini (California)
- Icaricia lupini texanus (Arizona)
- Icaricia lupini lutzi
- Icaricia lupini spangelatus
- Icaricia lupini alpicola
- Icaricia lupini goodpasturei

Formerly included as subspecies, Icaricia monticola, Icaricia dedeckera, and Icaricia chlorina are more recently thought to be their own species, with Icaricia lupini argentata now considered a subspecies of I. chlorina. I. l. alpicola may also be its own species.
