= Hemileuca hualapai =

Scientific classification
- Kingdom: Animalia
- Phylum: Arthropoda
- Class: Insecta
- Order: Lepidoptera
- Family: Saturniidae
- Subfamily: Hemileucinae
- Genus: Hemileuca
- Species: H. hualapai

Binomial name
- Hemileuca hualapai (Neumoegen, 1883)

Species of moth

Hemileuca hualapai, the hualapai buckmoth, is a species of insect in the family Saturniidae. It is found in Central America and North America.

The MONA or Hodges number for Hemileuca hualapai is 7728.
