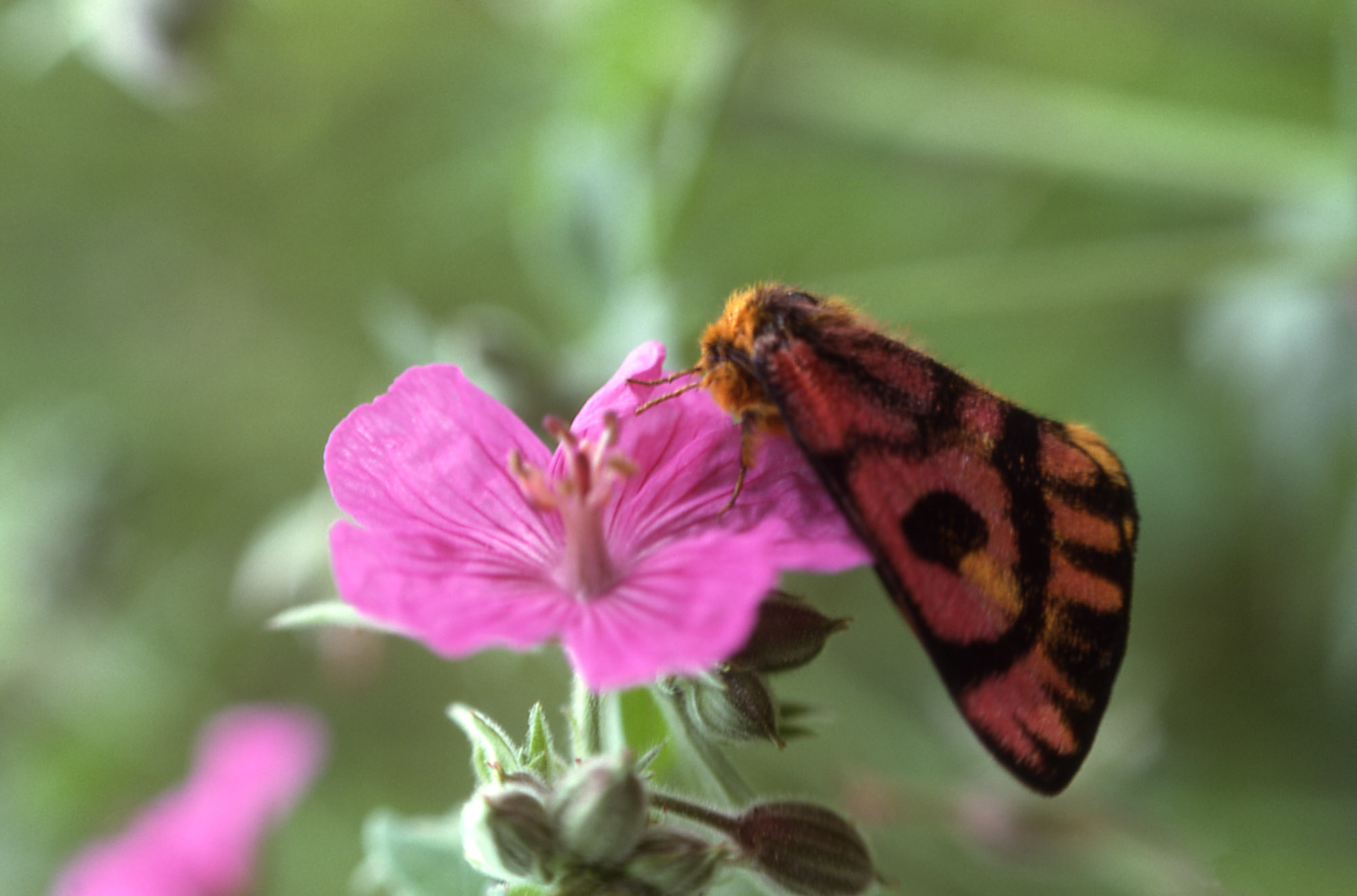
- Hemileuca eglanterina

Scientific classification
- Kingdom: Animalia
- Phylum: Arthropoda
- Clade: Pancrustacea
- Class: Insecta
- Order: Lepidoptera
- Family: Saturniidae
- Subfamily: Hemileucinae
- Genus: Hemileuca; Walker, 1855

Synonyms
- Euchronia Packard, 1864; Pseudohazis Grote & Robinson, 1866; Hera Harris, 1869; Euleucophaeus Packard, 1872; Agryrauges Grote, 1882

= Hemileuca =

Genus of moths

Hemileuca is a genus of North American moths in the family Saturniidae first described by Francis Walker in 1855. The Finnish University and Research Network currently lists 32 species of the genus. These moths are popular with butterfly collectors because of their variable coloration and wing patterns and their unusual lifestyle, which is an adaptation to the hot and dry habitats where most species live. Most of these moths fly in summer and autumn. The eggs are laid in ring-shaped clusters on stems or branches of the caterpillar's host plants and overwinter. The caterpillars develop to pupation before the hot summer of the following year; most pupate in summer, so that the moths emerge in the cooler late summer and autumn. The stinging hairs of the caterpillars cause a rash when touched. The rash can last from an hour to more than a week. In favorable years, the caterpillars can appear in masses.

== Features ==
The moths can be softly or brightly colored, in shades of gray, brown, white, black, yellow and red, and are very variable in appearance even within a species. In many species, the abdomen is colored red, which may serve to warn predators. In other species, it is ringed with yellow and black. The antennae of the males are bipectinate. The genitalia look similar to those of the genus Coloradia .

The caterpillars are black, dark red or dark brown, when they hatch. They develop species-specific color patterns as they mature. All species have stinging spines. The projections (scoli) on the back of the abdomen may consist of short tufts or groups of spines that do not have a central shaft. Scoli on the thoracic and posterior segments, on the sides, and on the back of the abdominal segments of some types, have a central shaft. This distinguishes them from the caterpillars of the closely related genus Automeris .The scoli are hollow tubes with sharp, brittle tips, each located above a venom gland comparable to a bee sting. If the tips break off and lodge in the skin, irritation may persist for a week or more.

== Distribution ==
The moths are found from southern Canada, across the western and southwestern United States, including the Great Basin, to Mexico . The core of the distribution there is in the desert, chaparral and mountain areas. Although some species are rare, most may be locally common. In general, the populations of those species that inhabit the wide and open habitats of the Great Basin and the deserts of the southwestern United States are widely dispersed but have limited areas of high density. Some desert species are seldom found near human habitation and, being economically unimportant, are scarcely documented.

== Behavior ==
The moths of most species are diurnal, and fly quickly in an unpredictable, uneven flight. If the animals are disturbed while sitting in their resting position, they raise their wings over their backs and bend their abdomen downwards. Species with yellow and black ringed abdomens also pulsate this part of their body, creating a resemblance to defensive wasps ( Müllerian mimicry ).

=== Flight and caterpillar times ===
The adults of most species fly in late summer or autumn. At higher altitudes they fly earlier in the year. Most species are active during the day. The few nocturnal species are found mainly in desert areas, where they fly in early autumn when evening temperatures are still high enough. In most species the eggs overwinter and the caterpillars hatch in March or April. In a few species the caterpillars hatch when the winter rains begin in southern California or when the summer rains begin in southeastern Arizona . In most species the moths eclose a few months after pupation, but some of the animals can overwinter as pupae. In desert species in particular, it has been documented that in captive-reared animals the pupae can survive for two to four years before the butterflies hatch. The species of the eglanterina group have a two-year life cycle in the high mountain habitats they inhabit with only a short growing season. The eggs overwinter in the first year, the pupae in the second. However, the same species develop much faster when reared under more favorable conditions. Their diapause is induced by the duration of daylight and the corresponding hormone levels .

The development cycle in which the eggs overwinter is probably an adaptation to the short vegetation period in the populated dry habitats. The caterpillars hatch in spring and can immediately find food of ideal quality. They complete their development before the hot and dry summer and spend it in the pupal stage, emerging in autumn or late summer when temperatures are milder again. Daytime activity also allows the moths to rest during the cold night, while lower temperatures are necessary to interrupt the development of the eggs.

=== Food of the caterpillars ===
The most important food plants of the caterpillars are members of the rose (Rosaceae), buckthorn (Rhamnaceae), willow (Salicaceae), daisy (Asteraceae), honeysuckle (Caprifoliaceae), sumac (Anacardiaceae), legume (Fabaceae), grass (Poaceae) and knotweed (Polygonaceae) families, Each type of caterpillar eats a different plant. The caterpillar's diet may determine the way it looks as an adult moth. Species that inhabit dry habitats develop on the shrubby plants that dominate there.

== Development ==
Females of all species lay their eggs in ring-shaped clusters around a branch or flower stalk of the food plant. In desert-dwelling species whose food plants are small, a clutch may contain fewer than 24 eggs, while in species that feed on shrubs, trees and herbaceous plants, the clutches contain 50 to 200 eggs.

Initially, the caterpillars feed in groups, staying close together. Dark coloring allows them to absorb solar radiation efficiently, and the resulting increase in body temperature accelerates physiological development, particularly at higher altitudes. The caterpillars molt through at least five instars, but depending on the species and the food plant, there may be six or seven. By the fourth stage, they live independently.

If these animals are disturbed, they curl up and drop to the ground. This behavior protects the caterpillar from larger predators, but, when repeated by the adult, only increases the moth's vulnerability to birds or rodents. The caterpillars are prey for parasitoid flies and small wasps. Sometimes up to 90% of the caterpillar population is parasitized.

All species pupate among plant litter on the ground or in tufts of grass. If the caterpillars find loose soil, most of them bury themselves to a depth of 10 to 20 centimeters.

== Taxonomy and systematics ==
The great variability of the moths, especially within the eglanterina group, led to the description of many species and subspecies. DNA studies suggest that most of these differences are produced by environmental factors, although the differences may be enough to inhibit crossbreeding.

Authoritative lists give different numbers of species, with disagreement about which variations should be counted as species, subspecies, or individual differences. Over 70 species have been named. While each proposed species name refers to a distinct type of moth, some differences are produced by environmental factors, primarily diet, rather than genetic differences. The previous (German) version of this article cited the Global Lepidoptera Names Index, which listed 27 species, and which is no longer published online. Many US documents were based on Poole and Gentill's Nomina Insecta Nearctica, which listed 23 species. The Finnish University and Research Network, whose index page traces some of these differences in taxonomic classification, currently lists 32 species.

Based on DNA studies, Tuskes and Collins defined the species groups tricolor, maia, electra, burnsi, chinatiensis and eglanterina, which are intended to better reflect the phylogenetic relationship. DNA studies seem to support the opinion of William Jacob Holland, whose 1903 Moth Book predicted that only a few of the species then being named would prove to be what Holland considered "true species."

== Species ==
- Hemileuca annulata Ferguson, 1971
- Hemileuca artemis Packard, 1893
- Hemileuca burnsi J.H. Watson, 1910
- Hemileuca chinatiensis (Tinkham, 1943)
- Hemileuca conwayae Peigler, 1985
- Hemileuca dyari (Draudt, 1930)
- Hemileuca eglanterina (Boisduval, 1852)
- Hemileuca electra Wright, 1884
- Hemileuca griffini Tuskes, 1978
- Hemileuca grotei Grote & Robinson, 1868
- Hemileuca hera (Harris, 1841)
- Hemileuca hualapai (Neumoegen, 1882)
- Hemileuca juno Packard, 1872
- Hemileuca lares (Druce, 1897)
- Hemileuca lex (Druce, 1897)
- Hemileuca lucina H. Edwards, 1887
- Hemileuca magnifica (Rotger, 1948)
- Hemileuca maia (Drury, 1773)
- Hemileuca mania (Druce, 1897)
- Hemileuca marillia Dyar, 1911
- Hemileuca menyanthevora Pavulaan, 2020
- Hemileuca mexicana (Druce, 1887)
- Hemileuca neumoegeni (H. Edwards, 1881)
- Hemileuca nevadensis Stretch, 1872
- Hemileuca numa (Druce, 1887)
- Hemileuca nuttalli (Strecker, 1875)
- Hemileuca oliviae Cockerell, 1898
- Hemileuca orleans Pavulaan, 2020
- Hemileuca peigleri Lemaire, 1981
- Hemileuca peninsularis Lemaire, 1993
- Hemileuca rubridorsa R. Felder & Rogenhofer, 1874
- Hemileuca sandra Pavulaan, 2020
- Hemileuca slosseri Peigler & Stone, 1989
- Hemileuca sororia (H. Edwards, 1881)
- Hemileuca stonei Lemaire, 1993
- Hemileuca tricolor (Packard, 1872)
- Hemileuca warreni Pavulaan, 2020
