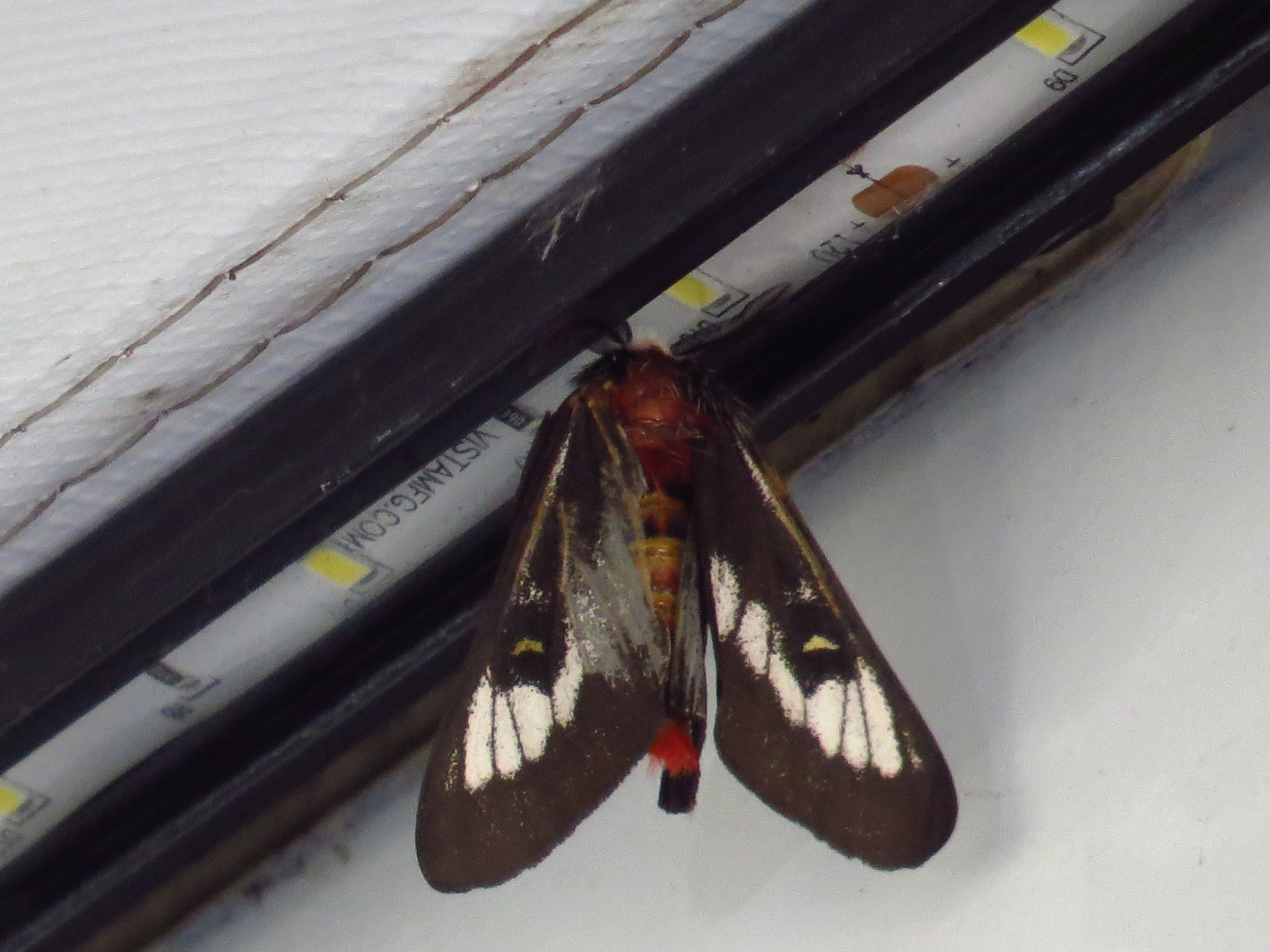

Scientific classification
- Kingdom: Animalia
- Phylum: Arthropoda
- Clade: Pancrustacea
- Class: Insecta
- Order: Lepidoptera
- Family: Saturniidae
- Genus: Hemileuca
- Species: H. juno

Binomial name
- Hemileuca juno Packard, 1872

= Hemileuca juno =

Species of moth

Hemileuca juno, the Juno buck moth, is an insect in the family Saturniidae. The species was first described by Alpheus Spring Packard in 1872. It is found in Central and North America.

The MONA or Hodges number for Hemileuca juno is 7735.
