= Hemileuca stonei =

Scientific classification
- Kingdom: Animalia
- Phylum: Arthropoda
- Class: Insecta
- Order: Lepidoptera
- Family: Saturniidae
- Subfamily: Hemileucinae
- Genus: Hemileuca
- Species: H. stonei

Binomial name
- Hemileuca stonei Lemaire, 1993

Species of moth

Hemileuca stonei, the pangola-grass moth or Stone's buckmoth, is an insect in the family Saturniidae. The species was first described by Claude Lemaire in 1993. It is found in Central and North America.

The MONA or Hodges number for Hemileuca stonei is 7744.5.
