= Hemileuca chinatiensis =

Scientific classification
- Kingdom: Animalia
- Phylum: Arthropoda
- Class: Insecta
- Order: Lepidoptera
- Family: Saturniidae
- Subfamily: Hemileucinae
- Genus: Hemileuca
- Species: H. chinatiensis

Binomial name
- Hemileuca chinatiensis (Tinkham, 1943)

Species of moth

Hemileuca chinatiensis, the chinati sheepmoth, is a species of insect in the family Saturniidae. It is found in North America.

The MONA or Hodges number for Hemileuca chinatiensis is 7739.
