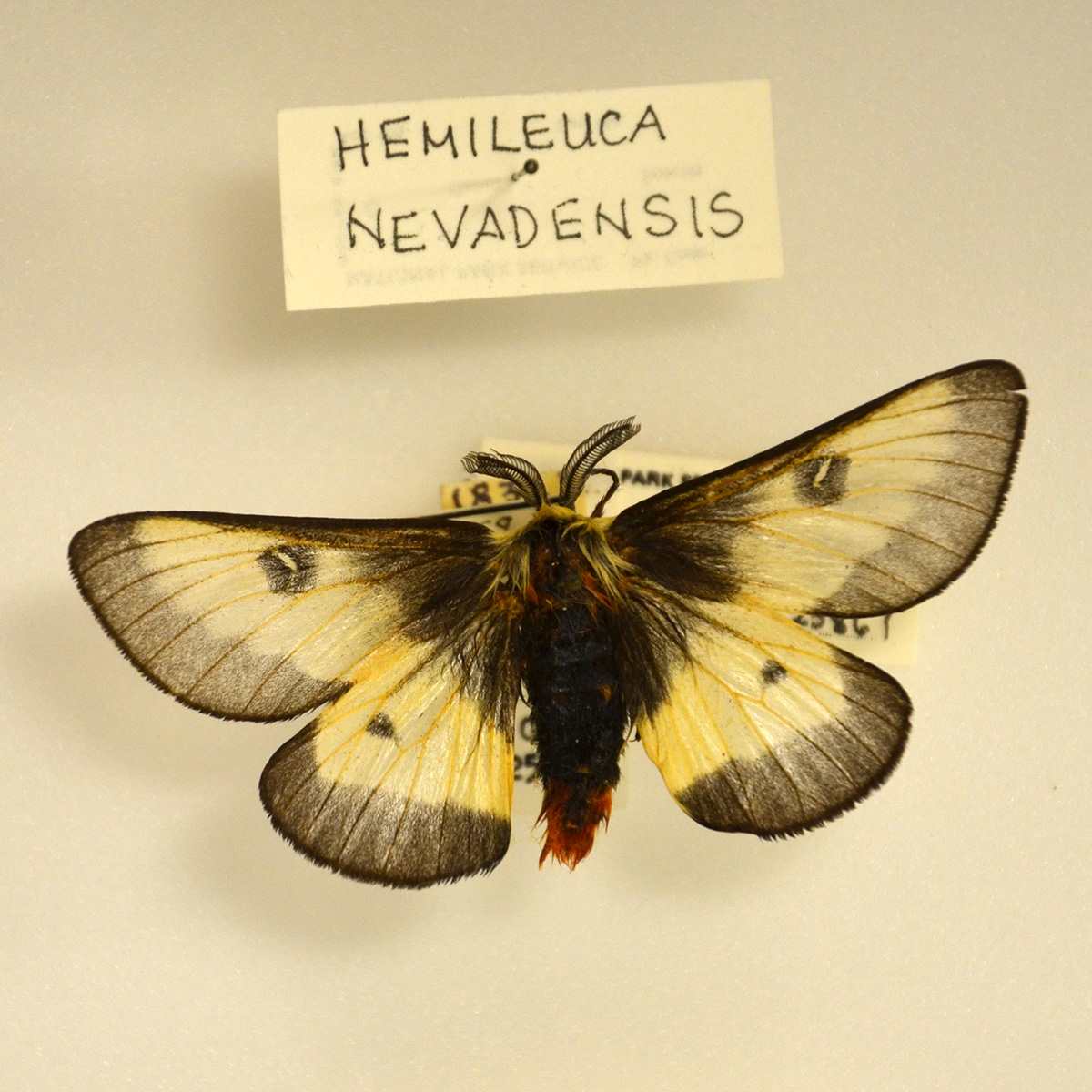

Scientific classification
- Kingdom: Animalia
- Phylum: Arthropoda
- Class: Insecta
- Order: Lepidoptera
- Family: Saturniidae
- Genus: Hemileuca
- Species: H. nevadensis

Binomial name
- Hemileuca nevadensis Stretch (1872)

= Hemileuca nevadensis =

Nevada buck moth

Species of moth

Hemileuca nevadensis, the Nevada buck moth, is a species in the family Saturniidae.

== Description ==
The female tends to be larger than the male, while males have black abdomens with red tips. The upperside of the wing is creamy white with black edges, each wing has "eyes" or black dots.

== Distribution ==
They range from the west coast all the way east to Wisconsin and Michigan. There have been a few sightings in New York, but not enough to confirm it as a localized species.

== Life cycle ==
There is one brood between September and December during that time the adult will lay eggs in rings around the twigs of the host plant. Once the caterpillars are ready to pupate they spin loose cocoons in plant litter near their host plant.

=== Larval foods ===
- Salix
- Populus

The adults don't feed.
