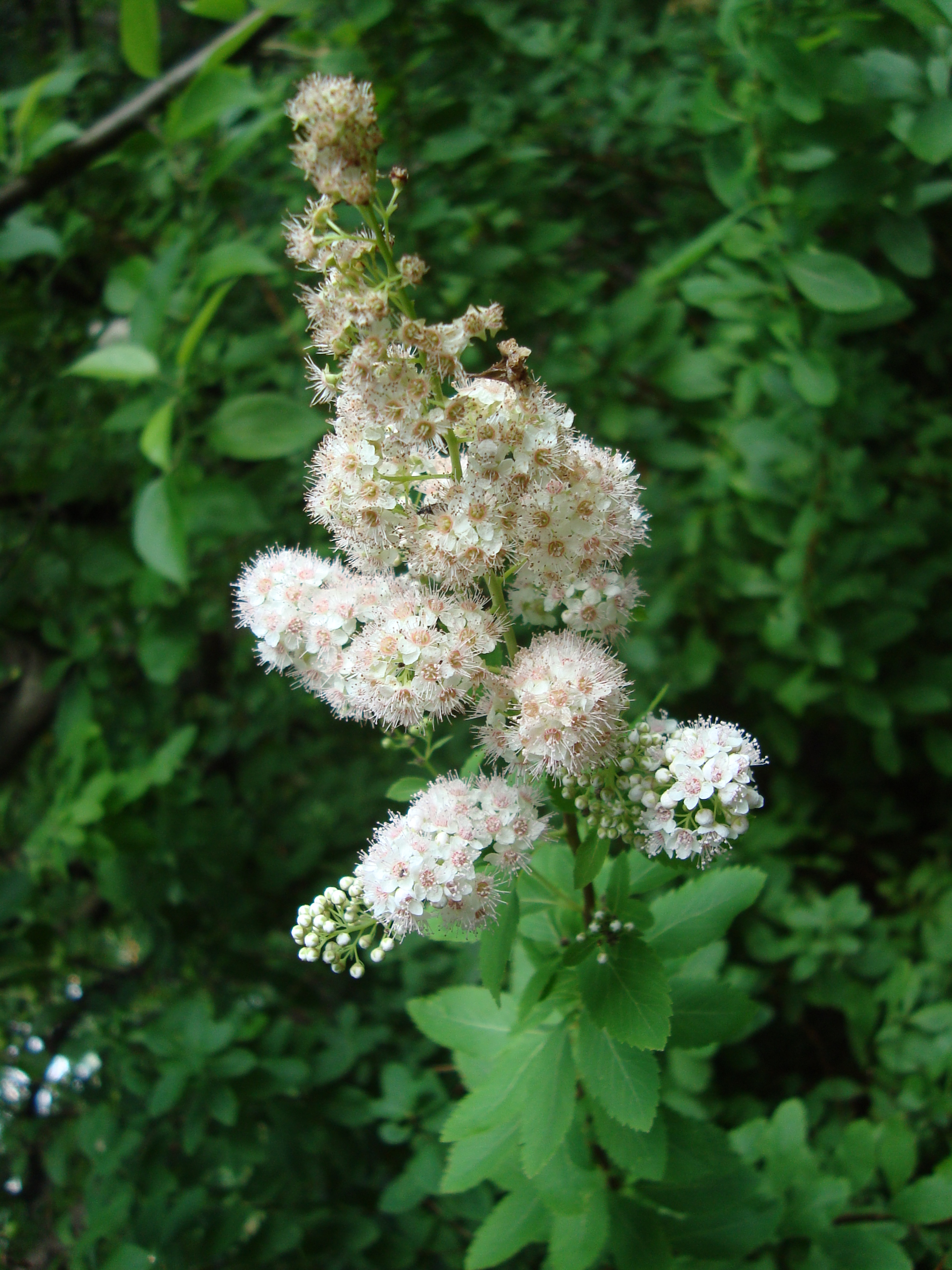

Scientific classification
- Kingdom: Plantae
- Clade: Tracheophytes
- Clade: Angiosperms
- Clade: Eudicots
- Clade: Rosids
- Order: Rosales
- Family: Rosaceae
- Genus: Spiraea
- Species: S. latifolia

Binomial name
- Spiraea latifolia (Aiton) Borkh. (1803)

= Spiraea latifolia =

Species of shrub

Spiraea latifolia, commonly known as broadleaf meadowsweet, is a shrub in the family Rosaceae. It has often been treated as a variety of Spiraea alba (white or narrowleaf meadowsweet). It is the primary host plant for Hemileuca lucina.
