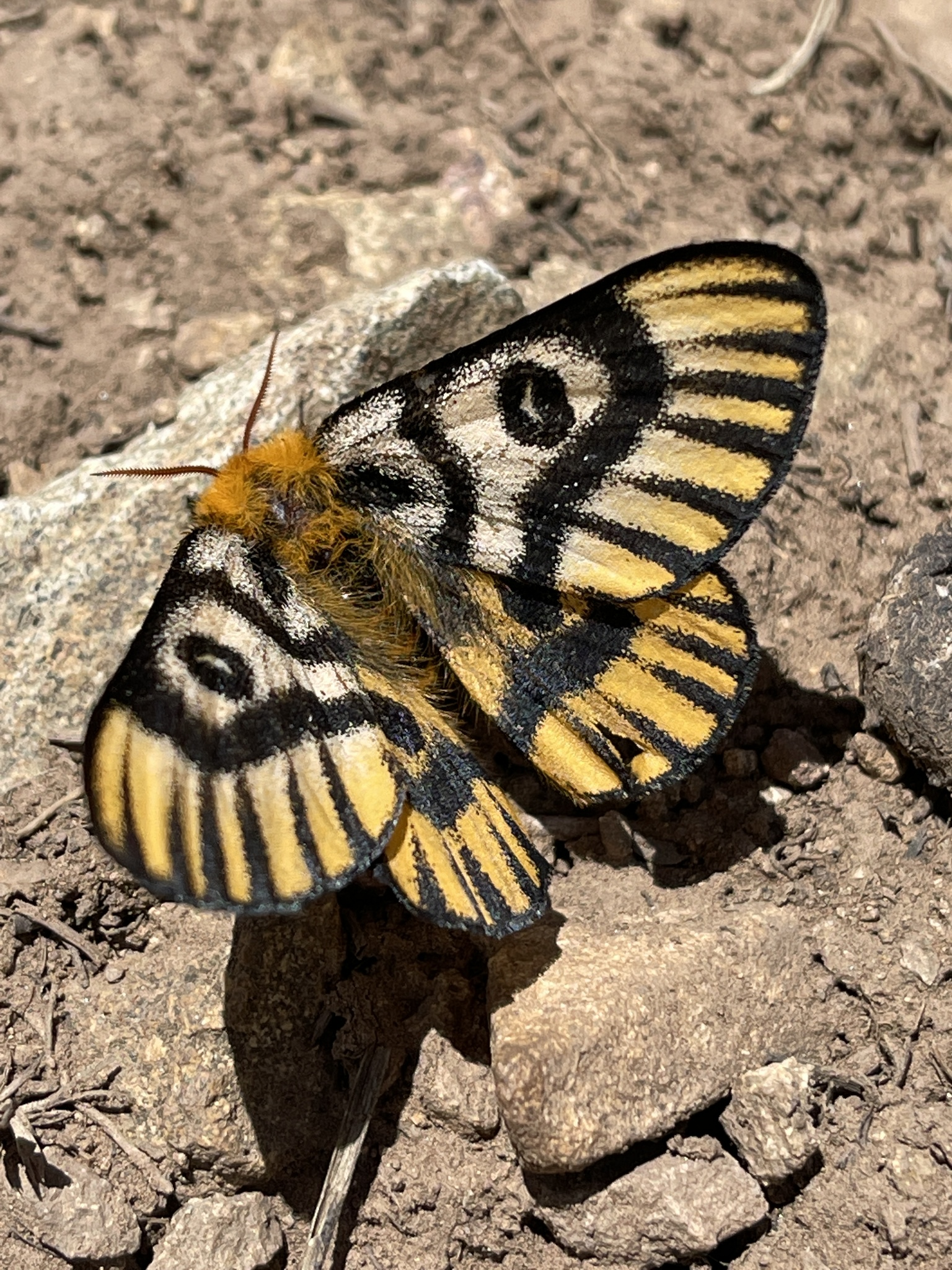

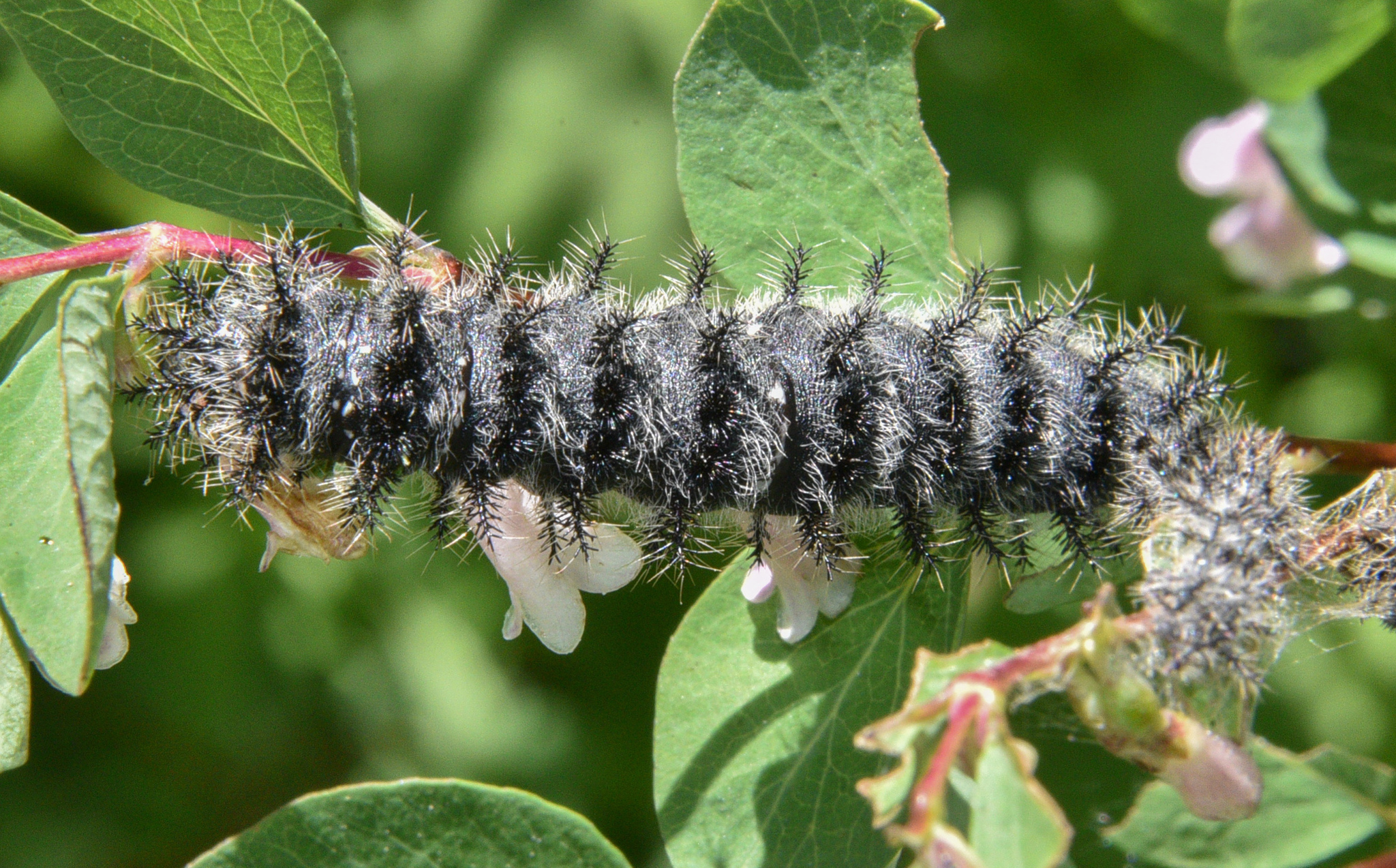

Scientific classification
- Kingdom: Animalia
- Phylum: Arthropoda
- Class: Insecta
- Order: Lepidoptera
- Family: Saturniidae
- Genus: Hemileuca
- Species: H. nuttalli

Binomial name
- Hemileuca nuttalli (Strecker, 1875)

Synonyms
- Pseudohazis nuttalli Strecker, 1875; Pseudohazis arizonensis Strecker, 1878; Pseudohazis washingtonensis Medlar, 1944; Pseudohazis nuttalli uniformis Cockerell, 1914

= Hemileuca nuttalli =

Nuttall's sheep moth

Species of moth

Hemileuca nuttalli, or Nuttall's sheep moth, is a moth in the Saturniidae family. It can be found in regions ranging from south-eastern British Columbia to eastern Washington, eastern Oregon, north-eastern California, Idaho, Nevada, northern Arizona, Utah, Montana, Wyoming, Colorado and north-western New Mexico. The species was first described by Ferdinand Heinrich Hermann Strecker in 1875 under the name Pseudohazis nuttalli.

== Identification ==
The wingspan of Nuttall's sheep moth ranges from 60 to 65 mm. The forewings are yellowish on the bottom and gradually morph into white on the top. The veins are black at the tips, and there is a black eyespot on each wing with a white center. The hindwings are yellow-orange with black-tipped veins and a thick black stripe that curves through the middle of the wing, up through the forewings. Additionally, there is a small black eyespot in the middle of each wing. The body of the moth is yellow-orange.

== Life history ==
The female moth lays eggs in rings around small twigs of the host plant. The larvae, which have been recorded feeding on Purshia tridentata, Symphoricarpos species, and Ribes species, are black and covered with yellow spines that can sting upon contact with skin.
