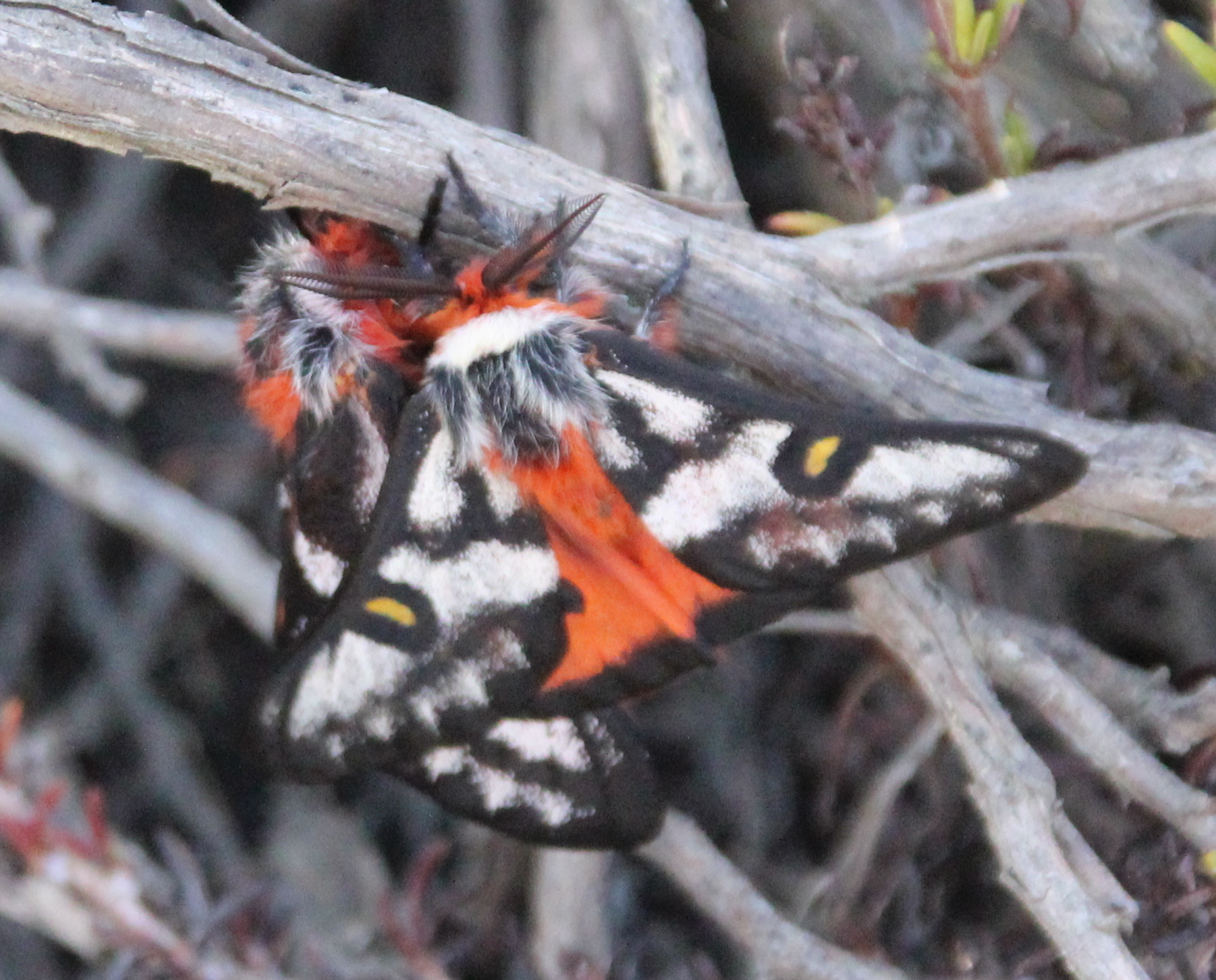

Scientific classification
- Kingdom: Animalia
- Phylum: Arthropoda
- Clade: Pancrustacea
- Class: Insecta
- Order: Lepidoptera
- Family: Saturniidae
- Genus: Hemileuca
- Species: H. electra

Binomial name
- Hemileuca electra W. G. Wright, 1884

= Hemileuca electra =

Species of moth

Hemileuca electra, the electra buckmoth, is a species of buck or io moth in the family Saturniidae. It is found in Central America and North America.

== Subspecies ==
- Hemileuca electra clio Barnes & McDunnough, 1918
- Hemileuca electra electra W. G. Wright, 1884
- Hemileuca electra mojavensis Tuskes and McElfresh, 1995
