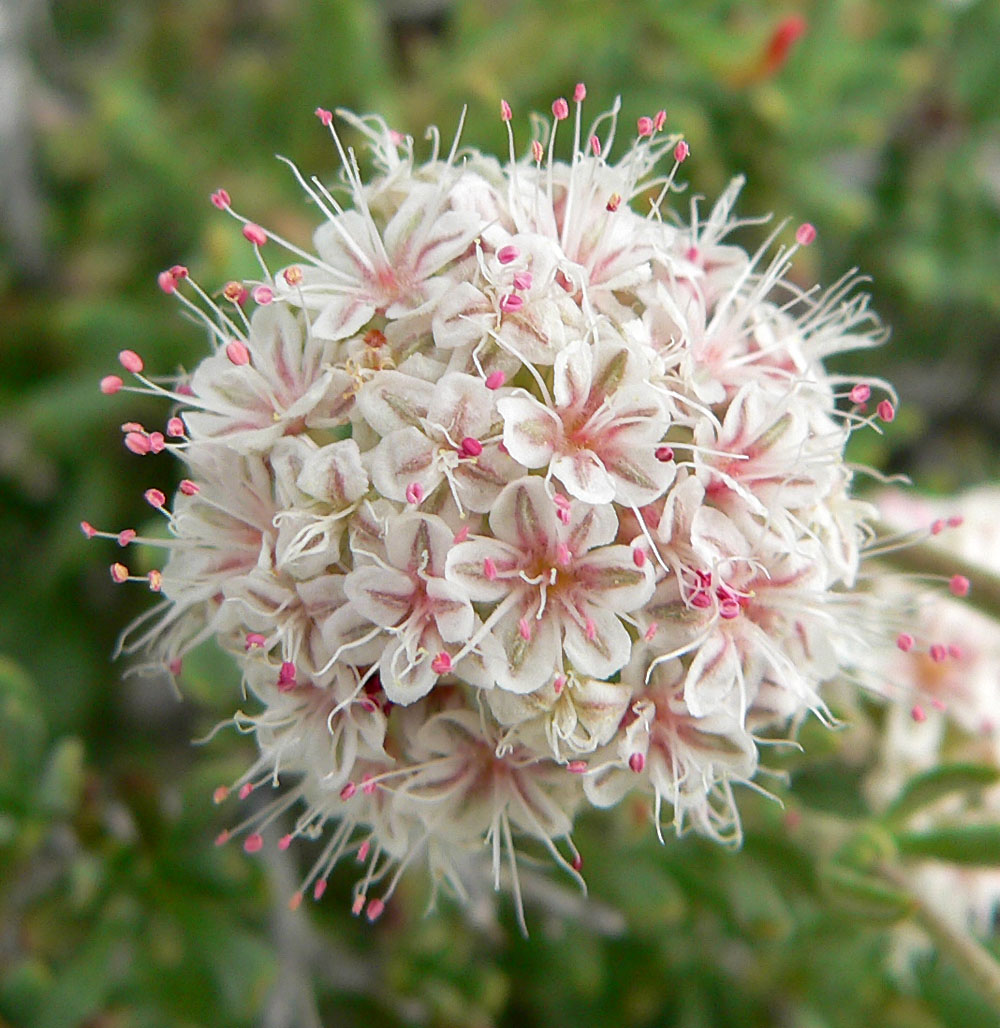

Conservation status
- Secure (NatureServe)

Scientific classification
- Kingdom: Plantae
- Clade: Embryophytes
- Clade: Tracheophytes
- Clade: Spermatophytes
- Clade: Angiosperms
- Clade: Eudicots
- Order: Caryophyllales
- Family: Polygonaceae
- Genus: Eriogonum
- Species: E. fasciculatum

Binomial name
- Eriogonum fasciculatum Benth.
- Natural range of Eriogonum fasciculatum, estimated with iNaturalist Geomodel

= Eriogonum fasciculatum =

California buckwheat

Species of flowering shrub

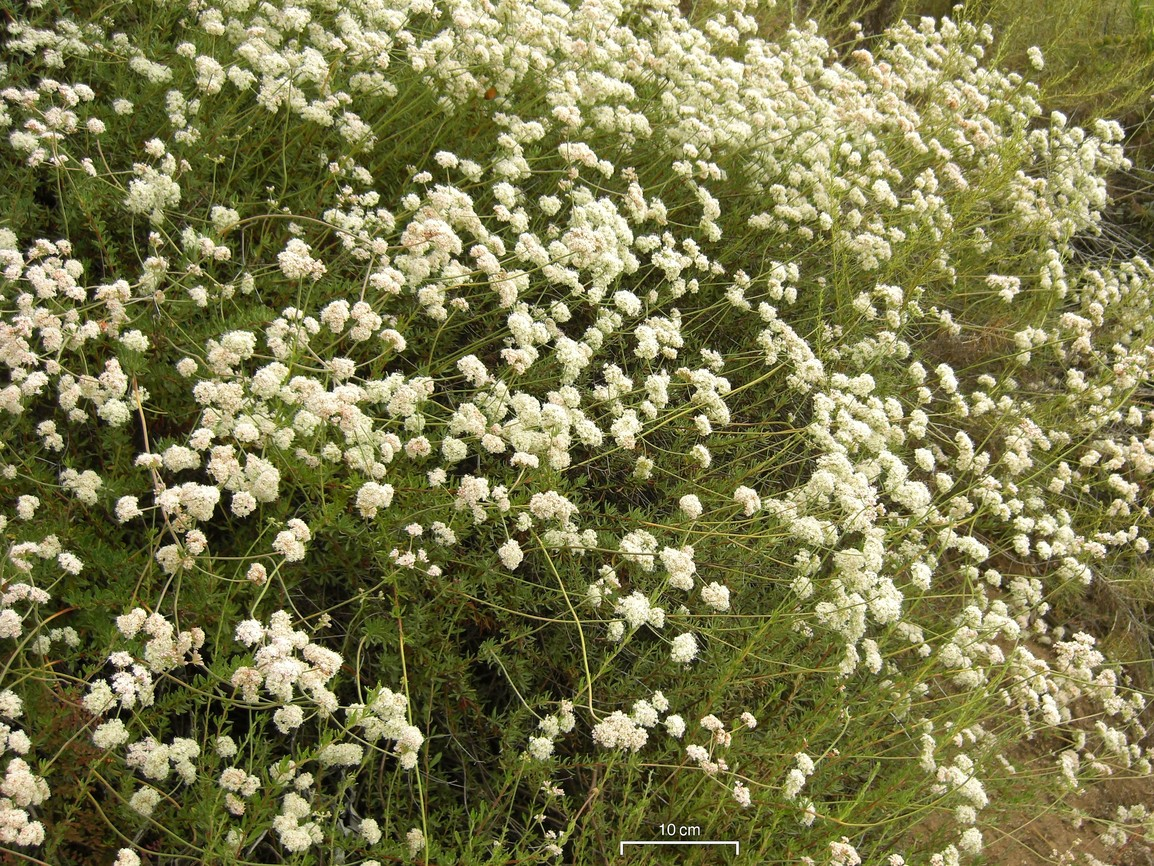
Blooming on Mount Wilson, San Gabriel Mountains, Southern California.

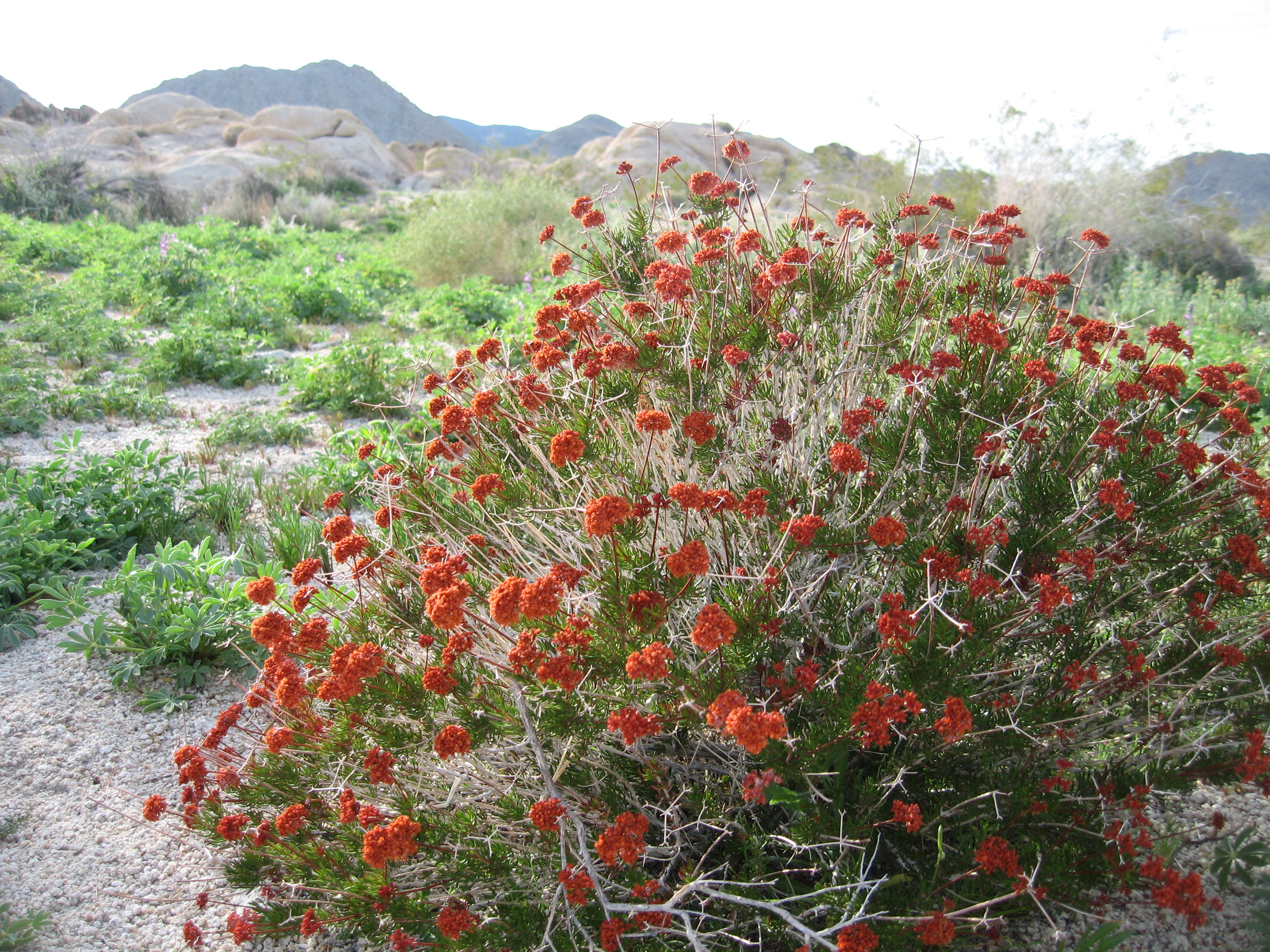
Dried flowers in Joshua Tree National Park.

Eriogonum fasciculatum is a species of wild buckwheat known by the common names California buckwheat and flat-topped buckwheat. Characterized by small, white and pink flower clusters that give off a cottony effect, this species grows variably from a patchy mat to a wide shrub, with the flowers turning a rusty color after blooming. This plant is of great benefit across its various habitats, providing an important food resource for a diversity of insect and mammal species. It also provides numerous ecosystem services for humans, including erosion control, post-fire mitigation, increases in crop yields when planted in hedgerows, and high habitat restoration value.

== Description ==
Eriogonum fasciculatum is variable in appearance, forming a patchy, compact mat or shrub approaching 1.5 metres (4.9 ft) in height and 2.5 m (8.2 ft) across. The stems are up to 25 centimetres (9.8 in) long, and may be wooly, hairy, or smooth depending on the variety. The leaves are up to 1.5 cm (0.59 in) long and 4 mm (0.16 in) wide, with a long, narrow linear shape, and the edges of the leaves (margins) are rolled under.

The inflorescence is up to 20 cm (7.9 in) tall by 15 cm (5.9 in) wide, with 3 to 8 involucres that are up to 4 mm (0.16 in) tall and 3 mm (0.12 in) wide. The flowers appear in dense, frilly clusters, with each individual flower colored pink and white and only a few millimeters across. The fruit is an achene, up to 2.5 mm (0.098 in) large and lacking any hair. After the fruits are set, the dry calyx provides buoyancy to the detached achenes, assisting in their dispersal by wind and water.

== Taxonomy ==
=== Varieties ===
There are a number of distinct varieties, they include:

- Eriogonum fasciculatum var. emphereium —endemic to western El Vizcaíno Biosphere Reserve in Baja California Sur.
- Eriogonum fasciculatum var. fasciculatum — Coastal California buckwheat, autonymous variety.
- Eriogonum fasciculatum var. flavoviride — eastern Mojave buckwheat, Sonoran Desert California buckwheat, bright green California buckwheat.
- Eriogonum fasciculatum var. foliolosum — red topped buckwheat.
- Eriogonum fasciculatum var. polifolium — Mojave Desert California buckwheat, mountain buckwheat, gray-leaved California buckwheat.

== Distribution and habitat ==
This common shrub is native to the Southwestern United States, California, and northwestern Mexico. It is found from the coasts and deserts of California and Baja California; eastwards through the Southern California Coast Ranges, Transverse Ranges, and Peninsular Ranges; and further east into the Sonoran and Mojave deserts and the Great Basin. It is also distributed into Baja California Sur south to the Tres Virgenes and Vizcaino peninsula.

It grows on slopes and dry washes in diverse habitats, including chaparral, coastal sage scrub, grasslands, sagebrush scrub, pinyon-juniper woodland, and creosote bush scrub.

== Uses ==
=== Humans ===
California buckwheat has been used as a food crop and medicinal plant by various Native American tribes. Some tribes make tea from the leaves, stems, and roots; whilst other tribes use the seeds to be consumed raw or used in porridges and baked items.

The Tongva, who call the plant wilakal, gather the leaves before flowering to make into a strong thick tea and grind the dried roots to use for headaches and stomach problems.

This widespread species is used extensively as a traditional medicinal plant by Native Americans for a variety of ailments, including the treatment of headache, diarrhea, and wounds. The Zuni people use a poultice of powdered root and apply it to cuts and arrow or bullet wounds. A decoction of the root is taken after parturition to heal lacerations. This same decoction is also taken for hoarseness and colds involving the throat.

=== Wildlife ===
This species is the most important native source of honey in California, particularly attractive to numerous species of native bees and other pollinators, and is a good source of nectar over many months in dryer areas. It also attracts introduced honey bees (Apis mellifera).

California buckwheats are nectar food plants for several butterflies, notably the Bernardino dotted-blue (Euphilotes bernardino), lupine blue (Icaricia lupini), Mormon metalmark (Apodemia mormo), and Behr's metalmark (Apodemia virgulti). Probably the butterfly most commonly seen with the species is the nut-brown hairstreak (Satyrium saepium), which frequents plants in full flower. It is a larval host for the Acmon blue, blue copper, Electra buckmoth, Gorgon copper, lupine blue, and western green hairstreak.

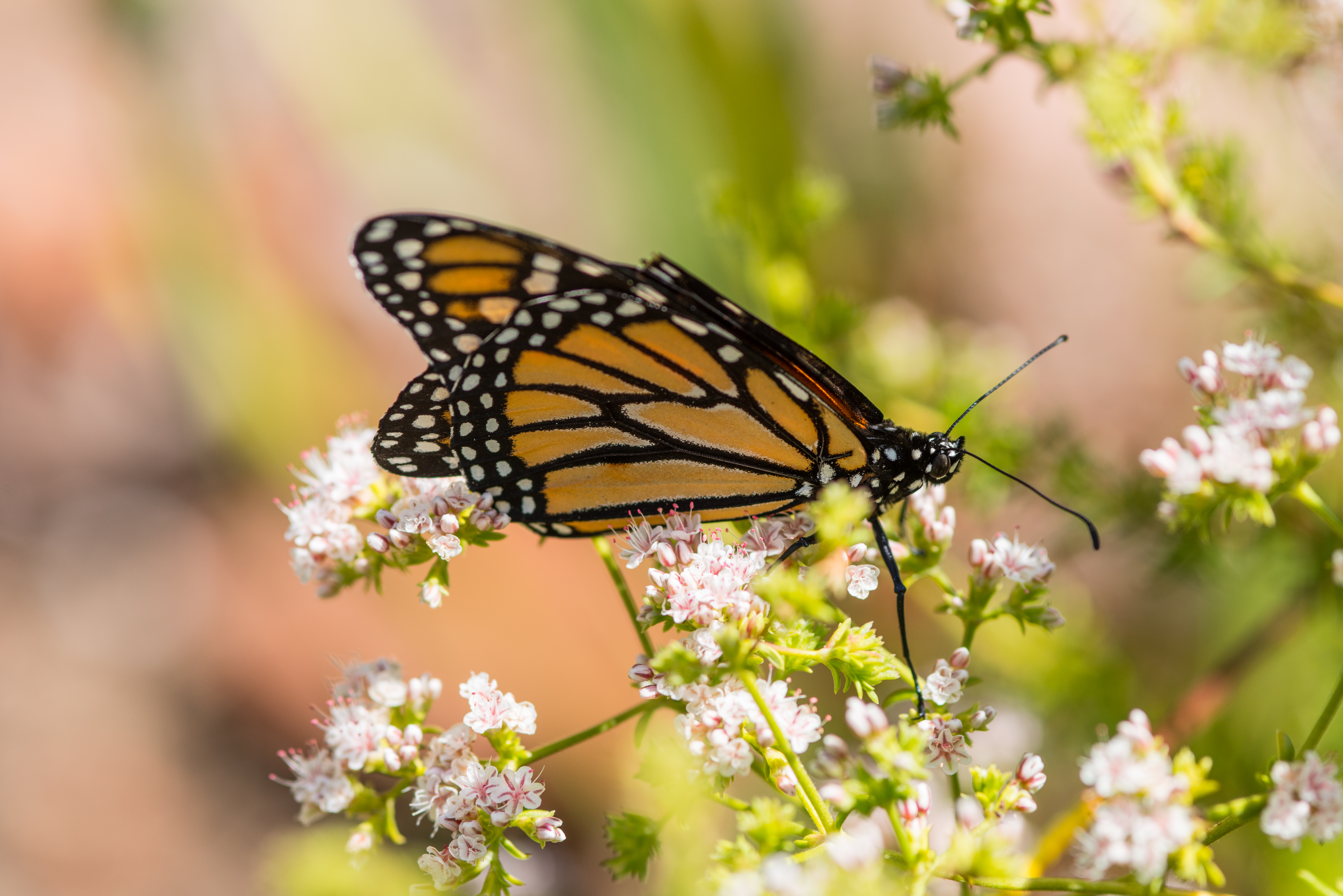
Monarch butterfly on California buckwheat.

=== Cultivation ===
Eriogonum fasciculatum is cultivated as an ornamental plant, for planting in native plant, drought tolerant, and wildlife gardens, and for larger designed natural landscaping and habitat restoration projects. It is also used in hedgerows to increase the yield of crops, to mitigate post-fire areas, and for erosion control.
