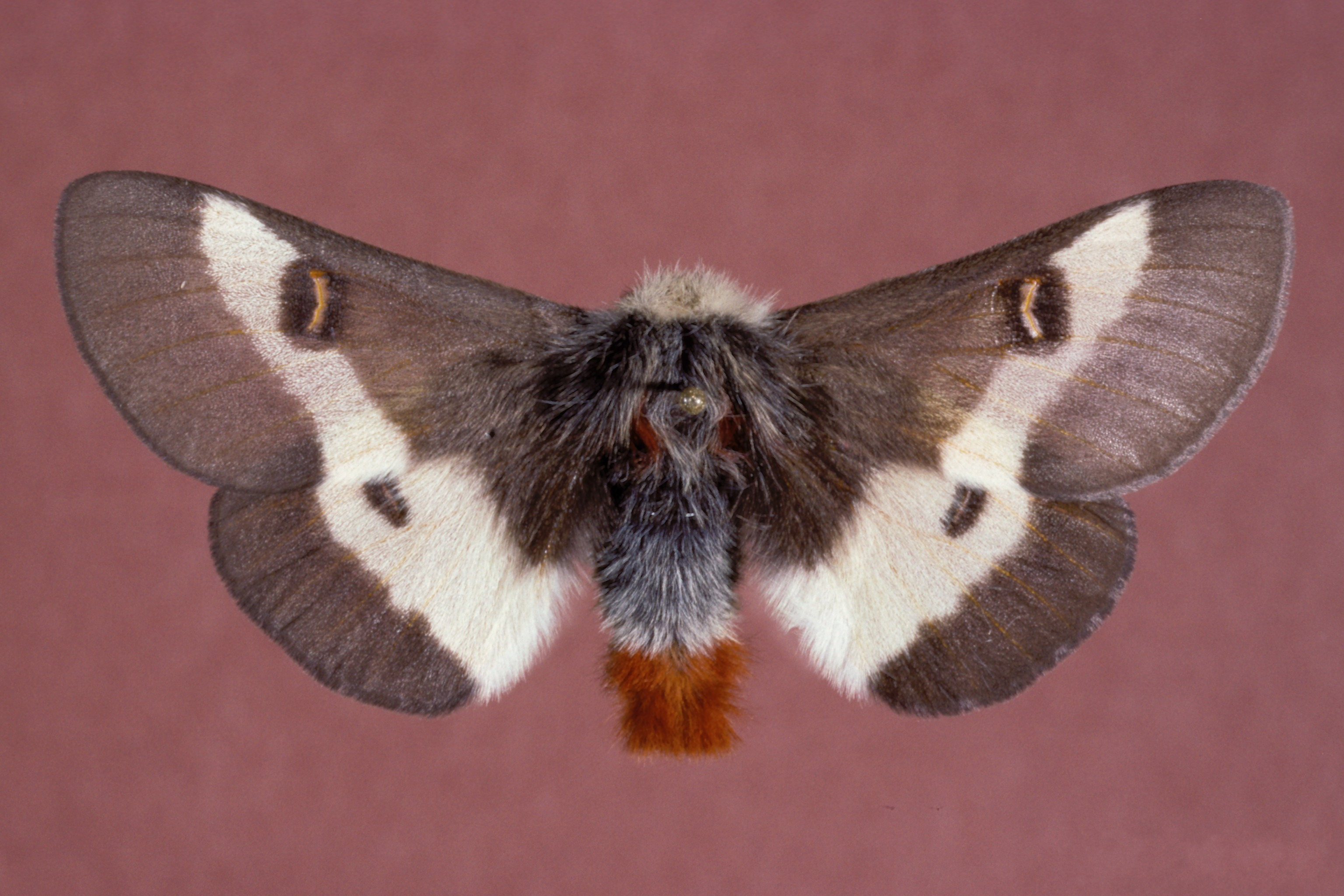
- Male

Conservation status
- Endangered (ESA)

Scientific classification
- Kingdom: Animalia
- Phylum: Arthropoda
- Clade: Pancrustacea
- Class: Insecta
- Order: Lepidoptera
- Family: Saturniidae
- Genus: Hemileuca
- Species: H. maia

Binomial name
- Hemileuca maia Drury, 1773

= Buck moth =

Species of moth

Hemileuca maia, the Buck moth or Buckmoth is a common insect, potentially ranging across the United States from peninsular Florida to New England, and as far west as Texas and Kansas. It was first described by Dru Drury in 1773. However, questions have been raised about whether the species should be defined by a broad or narrowed concept, where aspects of their naming is tied to populations that were used to define the species, those claimed to be from the Coastal barrens (Cape Cod-Long Island) around New York, such as the Long Island Pine Barrens. These may be referred to as the Coastal Barrens Buckmoth. In comparison, several [former] maia populations from diverse localities across the USA were instead assigned to different, novel subspecies. Subsequently, several of those have been since been relisted elsewhere as a valid species, after comments in Pohl & Nanz, 2023

Under the narrowed concept as a subspecies, Hemileuca maia maia is listed as endangered in the US state of Connecticut. Elsewhere the Bogbean Buckmoth (or bog buck moth) as Hemileuca maia menyanthevora Pavulaan, 2020 (but elsewhere listed as Hemileuca menyanthevora) is federally endangered, and also protected by Canada and the state of New York. There were five populations known historically but only three still survive, one in the US and two in Canada.

Many details about the biology of this group of allied Buckmoths have been previously recorded under the broad (and largely historical) concept of Hemileuca maia, with many details known about their ecology, etc. The larvae typically emerge in a single generation in the spring. The larvae are covered in hollow spines that are attached to a poison sac. The poison can cause symptoms ranging from stinging, itching and burning sensations to nausea. The larvae feed on various oaks including scrub oak (Quercus ilicifolia), live oak (Quercus virginiana), blackjack oak (Quercus marilandica), white oak (Quercus alba), and dwarf chinquapin oak (Quercus prinoides).

Eggs are typically laid in spiral clusters on oak twigs. Mature larvae enter the soil or leaf litter to pupate in late July and emerge between October and the following February as moths to mate and lay eggs. In Louisiana, particularly in cities such as Baton Rouge or New Orleans, where use of live oaks as street trees is extensive, the caterpillars can become a significant nuisance for humans. The caterpillars of this moth can also be a nuisance in some areas of Virginia, such as the Goshen Scout Reservation, where they are infamous for stinging people going to a summer camp in the area.

== Appearance and morphology ==
Under the broad concept of the species (see above), mature Hemileuca maia are characterized by having a dark gray to almost black coloring with a noticeable white band that forms across each wing and a very unique eyespot on the band. Adult moths have a wingspan of about 2 to 3 inches with a body size of about 6 cm in length however, males tend to be smaller than the females in the species. Both male and females have three body segments: the head, thorax and abdomen. However, in females all three segments are black whereas the male body segment is all black except for the abdomen which is a rusty red color thereby distinguishing them from the females. All buck moths have black legs with these small red cuffs around the top of the leg that is attached to the body segment.

Young buck moth caterpillars are completely black in color with the spiracles (these are small holes that act as an opening to their respiratory system) appearing as pale brown color with a black edge. On the other hand, the more adult/older caterpillars appear a lot lighter than the youth with some even looking to be white in appearance. The most prevalent feature on the Hemileuca maia caterpillars are the spines which they use as a defense mechanism against potential predators or in dangerous situations. These spines are located everywhere on both old and young caterpillars; however, the spines that are on the top of the caterpillar are longer, more abundant, and organized in specific rows. Fully grown caterpillars can reach a length of 2.5 inches and will use their small legs to move down to the ground where they will prepare to undergo metamorphosis into the adult buck moth.

== Life cycle ==
Adult Hemileuca maia will go through one generation a year that starts in the fall (typically October-November) when adult male moths will fly and mate with a female. Typically males of the species are stronger fliers as it is their sole responsibility to find a female to mate with. The females will lay about 150 eggs per generation and will deposit them on a host branch in a tight-knit ring. These eggs will then overwinter which means they will spend the entire winter season as an egg until spring time when conditions are favorable for them to emerge. Hemilecua maia will hatch as larvae in a group starting in early May once new plant growth starts to appear. These larvae will undergo six instar stages which are stages in which the larvae will molt and shed excess materials as the mature caterpillars prepare to pupate, becoming increasingly independent through each stage.

Once the caterpillars (larvae) reach their end instar stage they will pupate either in forest floor debris or by weaving a cocoon however the latter is more uncommon. These buck moths can pupate for up to two years as they wait to emerge into an adult moth. Once they emerge their only purpose is to find a mate and reproduce for the next generation which is further evident by their lack of mouthparts as adults rendering them unable to feed. The life cycle will then commence for the next generation.

== Habitat ==
Buck moths are found to be the most abundant in habitats that contain large oak forests whether that be in the more northern parts of the Eastern United States or as far south as the gulf of Florida. Some Buck moths have been found as far west as Wisconsin and Texas but predominately they are found on the east coast. This moth species prefers to live in flourishing oak forests rather than the ever increasing fragmented forests seen in the northeastern portions of the country. Since the buck moth's habitat centers around oak forests, this species is at an increased risk of habitat loss due to the effects of deforestation and the use of fire suppression methods that often employ chemicals and preventative burning techniques. Due to the effects of deforestation on the Buck moths, their habitats have moved to more unusual locations like urban cities as the moths search for new oak trees to call home.

Buck moths rely heavily on their habitat especially when it comes to their reproduction as the female moths use the twig branches of the oak tree to lay and store their eggs until they hatch. In their more northern locations, buck moths reside in a specific type of oak known as scrub oak which is a high value food source of their caterpillar form. These moths are found to be the most active in their habitats during the summertime months but will become active during warm periods in the fall months as the females find a mating partner. Buck moths not only use oaks as a place to live but this plant also serves as the main food source of this moth as they prefer eating oak species.

== Behavior ==
Hemileuca maia are typically the most active during the day when they focus heavily on the reproduction of the next generation of buck moths. As adults, Buck moths do not have mouthparts for feeding and therefore their focus is mostly on mating and laying eggs and so their behavior centers around their reproduction needs. The males are known to fly in a very erratic and rapid manner as they soar approximately 3 ft above ground when compared to the females in their species. Males will fly throughout the day with very few to no breaks as they search for a mating partner. One reason for the unusual flying behavior of the male Buck moth can be traced to the usage of pheromones by the females as a tool to attract a future mating partner.

During the early afternoon, virgin female buck moths will begin to release a small amount of sex pheromones which at the moment of their release, causes the male buck moths to act very erratically. At closer glance, the components of the sex pheromones were studied to identify their chemical makeup and what exactly was responsible for attracting the male moths. The major chemical component of the female pheromone is E10, Z12 hexadecadienyl acetate while there are a variety of minor components that are used by the females like E10,Z12 hexadecanol. In order for the pheromone to be effective at attracting a mate there must be at least one minor component involved in the pheromone or else the chemical attraction is rendered useless. Females who had already gone through reproduction were found to not produce strong enough pheromones to attract males and the males that were found to fly near these females did so in a non-erratic manner.

The female Hemileuca maia will lay their eggs in a unique spiral like manner with the larval eggs being closely bound together on the grass floor. Once hatched, the larva will feed in a social cluster until they reach their instar larval phase at which point they will detach from the other larvae and feed independently. Interestingly enough, once the buck moths hatch from their eggs they exhibit a marching-like behavior as they choose to follow one leader in the group in a straight line. Research has shown that when the buck moth leader gets removed from the group the rest of the moths become confused and restless waiting for their chosen leader to return, but if the leader does not return the moths will choose a new one .

In urban settings, buck moths garner much attention during outbreaks as larval Hemileuca maia have a strong stinging ability that results in an unpleasant wound on the affected skin. The spines of the larval buck moth are lined on the sides of their body with small toxic glands that hold the venom. In its larval stage, buck moths are known to pose a serious health risk to the human population as these spines can easily break off their bodies when aggressively handled or brushed against, thereby injecting venom into the skin of the human. This can lead to an intense burning of the skin with large red welts and even causing anaphylactic shock in certain individuals. There is an increasing number of patients each season that get stung by these larval moths with many patients seeing medical providers for dermatitis, or swelling and inflammation of the skin. The increased prevalence of these reported stings is an additional effect caused by the movement of buck moths to more urban locations due to the deforestation occurring in their normal habitats.

== Predators and parasites ==
Buck moths have a number of predators and parasites. Parasitoids such as the tachinid flies Compsilura concinnata and Leschenaultia flavipes, the ichneumonid wasp Hyposoter fugitivus and the braconid wasp Meteorus autographae attack buck moth caterpillars. Predators such as birds, spiders, dragonflies, and fish feed on the moth's caterpillars, pupae and/or adults, as do mites.

A nuclear polyhedrosis virus infects and kills the moth's caterpillars during their first and fourth instars. The virus embeds itself in the caterpillar's epidermis, fat, or tracheal matrix, causing the breakdown of the moth's body as well as vomiting and diarrhea, thus killing the insect. Microbial control may be able to safely reduce the moth's numbers when needed during infestations in populated areas.
