= Spiraea hypericifolia =

- Budding flowers
- in Zaporizhzhia

Scientific classification
- Kingdom: Plantae
- Clade: Tracheophytes
- Clade: Angiosperms
- Clade: Eudicots
- Clade: Rosids
- Order: Rosales
- Family: Rosaceae
- Genus: Spiraea
- Species: S. hypericifolia

Binomial name
- Spiraea hypericifolia L.

Synonyms
- List: Spiraea acutifolia Willd.; Spiraea ambigua Pall.; Spiraea brevipes Borbás; Spiraea cavanillesii Gand.; Spiraea chamaedryfolia subsp. crenifolia (C.A.Mey.) Nyman; Spiraea crenata subsp. kotschyana (Boiss.) Fed.; Spiraea crenata var. kotschyana Boiss.; Spiraea crenata Cav.; Spiraea crenata Pall.; Spiraea crenifolia C.A.Mey.; Spiraea cuneifolia Sennen & Elías; Spiraea flabellata Bertol. ex Guss.; Spiraea flabellata var. crenata Nyman; Spiraea hispanica Barrelier ex Zabel; Spiraea hispanica Ortega; Spiraea hispanica Ortega ex C.Vicioso; Spiraea hispanica var. rhodoclada (Leresche & Levier) Losa; Spiraea hookeriana Raf.; Spiraea hypericifolia var. acuta Ser.; Spiraea hypericifolia var. acutifolia (Willd.) Wenz.; Spiraea hypericifolia var. brevifolia Bunge; Spiraea hypericifolia var. brevifolia Lavallée; Spiraea hypericifolia var. flabellata (Bertol. ex Guss.) Zabel; Spiraea hypericifolia var. genuina Ledeb.; Spiraea hypericifolia var. heterophylla Sommier & Levier; Spiraea hypericifolia var. microphylla Ledeb.; Spiraea hypericifolia var. nana (Anon.) Lavallée; Spiraea hypericifolia var. nutans (K.Koch) Lavallée; Spiraea hypericifolia var. obovata Lavallée; Spiraea hypericifolia var. obovata (Waldst. & Kit. ex Willd.) Maxim.; Spiraea hypericifolia proles obovata (Waldst. & Kit. ex Willd.) Asch. & Graebn.; Spiraea hypericifolia var. plukenetiana Ser.; Spiraea hypericifolia f. subalpina Zinserl.; Spiraea hypericifolia var. thalictroides Mérat; Spiraea hypericifolia var. truncata Zabel; Spiraea hypericifolia var. turkestanica Ledeb. ex Zabel; Spiraea hypericifolia proles typica Asch. & Graebn.; Spiraea hypericifolia var. typica Maxim.; Spiraea italica Raf.; Spiraea microphylla Sennen & Elías; Spiraea nana G.Kirchn.; Spiraea nutans K.Koch; Spiraea oblongifolia Ledeb.; Spiraea obovata Rchb.; Spiraea obovata Waldst. & Kit. ex Willd.; Spiraea obovata var. cavanillesii (Gand.) Braun-Blanq.; Spiraea obovata var. rhodoclada (Leresche & Levier) Braun-Blanq.; Spiraea orbicularis Hoffmanns.; Spiraea reticulata Raf.; Spiraea rhodoclada Leresche & Levier; Spiraea sibirica Zabel; Spiraea speciosa K.Koch; Spiraea virgata Raf.; Spiraea virgata var. hookeriana Raf.

Species of plant

Spiraea hypericifolia, the Iberian spirea or Italian may, is a species of flowering plant in the family Rosaceae. It is native to southern and eastern Europe, Siberia, Central Asia, the Himalayas, Mongolia, and most of China. A deciduous shrub reaching 1.5 m (5 ft), it is found in open woodlands, in thickets, or on dry slopes.

== Subtaxa ==
The following subspecies are accepted:

- Spiraea hypericifolia subsp. hypericifolia – Entire range, except Portugal, Spain, France, and Iran, and introduced to Belarus, Germany, and Spain
- Spiraea hypericifolia subsp. kotschyana (Boiss.) Gladkova – Turkey, the Caucasus, Iran, and Turkmenistan
- Spiraea hypericifolia subsp. obovata (Waldst. & Kit. ex Willd.) H.Huber – Portugal, Spain, France, and introduced to Belgium
