= Neoserica lutea =

Scientific classification
- Kingdom: Animalia
- Phylum: Arthropoda
- Class: Insecta
- Order: Coleoptera
- Suborder: Polyphaga
- Infraorder: Scarabaeiformia
- Family: Scarabaeidae
- Genus: Neoserica
- Species: N. lutea

Binomial name
- Neoserica lutea Brenske, 1899

Species of beetle

Neoserica lutea is a species of beetle of the family Scarabaeidae. It is found in Indonesia (Kalimantan).

== Description ==
Adults reach a length of about 7.5 mm. This species belongs to the glossy group of Neoserica species and is closely related to Neoserica suturata and Neoserica rufobrunnea. It differs from the latter by a larger clypeus, which has a distinct tubercle in the middle.
