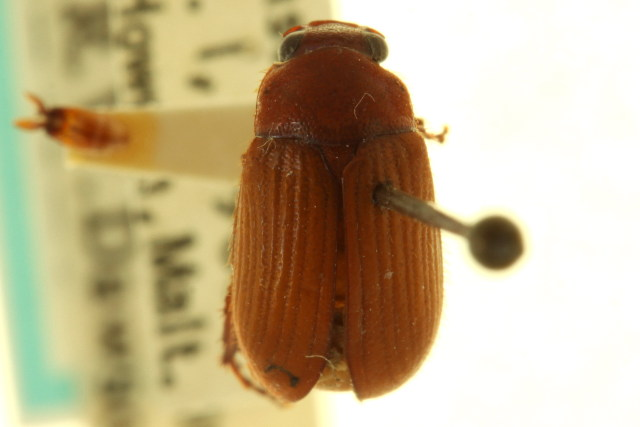

Scientific classification
- Kingdom: Animalia
- Phylum: Arthropoda
- Class: Insecta
- Order: Coleoptera
- Suborder: Polyphaga
- Infraorder: Scarabaeiformia
- Family: Scarabaeidae
- Genus: Serica
- Species: S. pusilla

Binomial name
- Serica pusilla Dawson, 1922

Synonyms
- Serica errans Blatchley, 1929

= Serica pusilla =

Species of beetle

Serica pusilla is a species of beetle of the family Scarabaeidae. It is found in the United States (Florida).

== Description ==
Adults are very similar to Serica elongata and Serica tantula, but the eyes and antennal clubs are smaller as in tantula and the elytral striae are line-like and more regularly punctured as in elongata. The elytra seem to show a stronger iridescent sheen than in either of the two other species.
