= Neoserica rufofusca =

Scientific classification
- Kingdom: Animalia
- Phylum: Arthropoda
- Clade: Pancrustacea
- Class: Insecta
- Order: Coleoptera
- Suborder: Polyphaga
- Infraorder: Scarabaeiformia
- Family: Scarabaeidae
- Genus: Neoserica
- Species: N. rufofusca

Binomial name
- Neoserica rufofusca Moser, 1916

Species of beetle

Neoserica rufofusca is a species of beetle of the family Scarabaeidae. It is found in Indonesia (Sumatra).

== Description ==
Adults reach a length of about 7 mm. They are very similar to Neoserica rufobrunnea. The head is quite densely punctate and sparsely setate and the antennae are yellowish-brown. The pronotum has quite dense punctation and the lateral margins are setate and slightly curved. The sculpture of the elytra is almost the same as in N. rufobrunnea.
