= Zaeera pulcherrima =

Scientific classification
- Kingdom: Animalia
- Phylum: Arthropoda
- Class: Insecta
- Order: Coleoptera
- Suborder: Polyphaga
- Infraorder: Cucujiformia
- Family: Cerambycidae
- Genus: Zaeera
- Species: Z. pulcherrima

Binomial name
- Zaeera pulcherrima Nonfried, 1894

Species of beetle

Zaeera pulcherrima is a species of beetle in the family Cerambycidae. It was described by Nonfried in 1894. It is known from Papua New Guinea.
