= Serica unicolor =

Scientific classification
- Kingdom: Animalia
- Phylum: Arthropoda
- Class: Insecta
- Order: Coleoptera
- Suborder: Polyphaga
- Infraorder: Scarabaeiformia
- Family: Scarabaeidae
- Genus: Serica
- Species: S. unicolor

Binomial name
- Serica unicolor Nonfried, 1894

Synonyms
- Serica sumatrana Nonfried, 1894

Species of beetle

Serica unicolor is a species of beetle of the family Scarabaeidae. It is found in Indonesia (Sumatra).

== Description ==
Adults reach a length of about 7-7.5 mm. They are very dark, almost blackish-brown (dark brown underneath), slightly dull and opalescent. The clypeus is broad, poorly margined, slightly raised in the middle of the surface, slightly wrinkled, densely punctate with setae behind the anterior margin. The frons is more finely punctate. The pronotum is distinctly projecting forward in the middle anteriorly, the sides slightly rounded, the posterior angles rounded. It is finely and densely punctate. The elytra show almost no striae and are only very irregularly and indistinctly marked. The very slightly raised intermediate margins have even punctation. The pygidium is shiny and widely punctate.
