= Paramorphochelus agricola =

Scientific classification
- Kingdom: Animalia
- Phylum: Arthropoda
- Class: Insecta
- Order: Coleoptera
- Suborder: Polyphaga
- Infraorder: Scarabaeiformia
- Family: Scarabaeidae
- Genus: Paramorphochelus
- Species: P. agricola

Binomial name
- Paramorphochelus agricola (Lebis, 1961)

Synonyms
- Pseudodontoplia agricola Lebis, 1961

Species of beetle

Paramorphochelus agricola is a species of beetle of the family Scarabaeidae. It is found in Madagascar.

== Description ==
Adults reach a length of about 6–9 mm (0.24–0.35 in). Their body is less elongated and more massive than that of similar Paramorphochelus seorsus. The upper surface is yellowish-brown, with fine, short hairs.
