= Stesilea tuberculata =

Scientific classification
- Kingdom: Animalia
- Phylum: Arthropoda
- Class: Insecta
- Order: Coleoptera
- Suborder: Polyphaga
- Infraorder: Cucujiformia
- Family: Cerambycidae
- Genus: Stesilea
- Species: S. tuberculata

Binomial name
- Stesilea tuberculata Nonfried, 1894

Species of beetle

Stesilea tuberculata is a species of beetle in the family Cerambycidae. It was described by Anton Nonfried in 1894.
