= Neoserica picea =

Scientific classification
- Kingdom: Animalia
- Phylum: Arthropoda
- Class: Insecta
- Order: Coleoptera
- Suborder: Polyphaga
- Infraorder: Scarabaeiformia
- Family: Scarabaeidae
- Genus: Neoserica
- Species: N. picea

Binomial name
- Neoserica picea (Nonfried, 1891)

Synonyms
- Serica picea Nonfried, 1891

Species of beetle

Neoserica picea is a species of beetle of the family Scarabaeidae. It is found in Cambodia, Myanmar and Thailand.

== Description ==
Adults reach a length of about 9 mm. They have an oblong-ovate, brown and dull body. The clypeus is broad, slightly narrowed anteriorly, scarcely margined laterally, and only weakly margined anteriorly, and more widely punctate anteriorly than posteriorly. The frons is broadly flat. The pronotum is scarcely projecting anteriorly in the middle, the sides only slightly rounded anteriorly, the posterior angles distinctly rounded, finely punctate. The scutellum is large and pointed. The elytra are punctate in the striae, densely and irregularly more coarsely punctate beside them, the very weakly convex intervals are more sparsely punctate, and the marginal setae are closely spaced. The pygidium is broad, evenly convex and rounded at the apex.
