= Clodia decorata =

Scientific classification
- Kingdom: Animalia
- Phylum: Arthropoda
- Class: Insecta
- Order: Coleoptera
- Suborder: Polyphaga
- Infraorder: Cucujiformia
- Family: Cerambycidae
- Subfamily: Lamiinae
- Tribe: Acanthocinini
- Genus: Clodia
- Species: C. decorata

Binomial name
- Clodia decorata Nonfried, 1894

Species of beetle

Clodia decorata is a species of Long-Horned Beetle in the beetle family Cerambycidae. It is found in Sumatra.
