= Juiaparus erythropus =

Scientific classification
- Kingdom: Animalia
- Phylum: Arthropoda
- Class: Insecta
- Order: Coleoptera
- Suborder: Polyphaga
- Infraorder: Cucujiformia
- Family: Cerambycidae
- Subfamily: Cerambycinae
- Tribe: Cerambycini
- Genus: Juiaparus
- Species: J. erythropus

Binomial name
- Juiaparus erythropus (Nonfried, 1895)

Synonyms
- Brasilianus erythropus Fragoso, 1982; Hamaticherus erythropus Aurivillius, 1912; Hammatocherus erythropus Nonfried, 1895

Species of beetle

Juiaparus erythropus is a species in the longhorn beetle family Cerambycidae. It is found in Colombia.
