= Paramorphochelus cornutus =

Scientific classification
- Kingdom: Animalia
- Phylum: Arthropoda
- Class: Insecta
- Order: Coleoptera
- Suborder: Polyphaga
- Infraorder: Scarabaeiformia
- Family: Scarabaeidae
- Genus: Paramorphochelus
- Species: P. cornutus

Binomial name
- Paramorphochelus cornutus (Nonfried, 1892)

Synonyms
- Hoplia cornuta Nonfried, 1892; Pseudodontoplia bidentata Lebis, 1961

Species of beetle

Paramorphochelus cornutus is a species of beetle of the family Scarabaeidae. It is found in Madagascar.

== Description ==
Adults reach a length of about 6.5–8 mm (0.26–0.31 in). They have an elongated body. The upper surface is reddish-brown with sparse, irregularly arranged hairs.

== Life history ==
The larvae have been recorded from rainfed rice fields in medium and high altitude areas.
