= Maladera siamensis =

Scientific classification
- Kingdom: Animalia
- Phylum: Arthropoda
- Class: Insecta
- Order: Coleoptera
- Suborder: Polyphaga
- Infraorder: Scarabaeiformia
- Family: Scarabaeidae
- Genus: Maladera
- Species: M. siamensis

Binomial name
- Maladera siamensis (Nonfried, 1891)

Synonyms
- Serica siamensis Nonfried, 1891

Species of beetle

Maladera siamensis is a species of beetle of the family Scarabaeidae. It is found in Thailand.

== Description ==
Adults reach a length of about 7.5 mm. They are brown (darker above), and almost entirely dull, with only the tibiae and tarsi shiny. The clypeus is broad, slightly tapered, finely rounded, and distinctly but not very densely punctate without wrinkles, without setae. The frons is shiny behind the suture and broad. The pronotum is distinctly transverse, not projecting at the anterior margin, and evenly slightly rounded at the lateral margin. The elytra are irregularly and densely punctate in the striae, with the intervals barely raised, less punctate, and the margin finely setate. The pygidium is distinctly pointed.
