= Parastesilea grisescens =

Scientific classification
- Kingdom: Animalia
- Phylum: Arthropoda
- Class: Insecta
- Order: Coleoptera
- Suborder: Polyphaga
- Infraorder: Cucujiformia
- Family: Cerambycidae
- Genus: Parastesilea
- Species: P. grisescens

Binomial name
- Parastesilea grisescens (Breuning, 1938)

Synonyms
- Stesilea grisescens Breuning, 1938

Species of beetle

Parastesilea grisescens is a species of beetle in the family Cerambycidae. It was described by Stephan von Breuning in 1938, originally under the genus Stesilea.
