= Metaleptus hondurae =

Scientific classification
- Kingdom: Animalia
- Phylum: Arthropoda
- Class: Insecta
- Order: Coleoptera
- Suborder: Polyphaga
- Infraorder: Cucujiformia
- Family: Cerambycidae
- Genus: Metaleptus
- Species: M. hondurae

Binomial name
- Metaleptus hondurae Nonfried, 1894

Species of beetle

Metaleptus hondurae is a species of beetle in the family Cerambycidae. It was described by Nonfried in 1894.
