= Madahoplia alluaudi =

Scientific classification
- Kingdom: Animalia
- Phylum: Arthropoda
- Class: Insecta
- Order: Coleoptera
- Suborder: Polyphaga
- Infraorder: Scarabaeiformia
- Family: Scarabaeidae
- Genus: Madahoplia
- Species: M. alluaudi

Binomial name
- Madahoplia alluaudi Lacroix, 1998

Species of beetle

Madahoplia alluaudi is a species of beetle of the family Scarabaeidae. It is found in Madagascar.

== Description ==
Adults reach a length of about 4.5–5 mm (0.18–0.20 in). They are similar to Madahoplia griseosetosa, but their body is more elongated. The upper surface is reddish-brown with elongated, loosely spaced, white scales.
