= Madahoplia niviscutata =

Scientific classification
- Kingdom: Animalia
- Phylum: Arthropoda
- Class: Insecta
- Order: Coleoptera
- Suborder: Polyphaga
- Infraorder: Scarabaeiformia
- Family: Scarabaeidae
- Genus: Madahoplia
- Species: M. niviscutata

Binomial name
- Madahoplia niviscutata (Fairmaire, 1903)

Synonyms
- Hoplia niviscutata Fairmaire, 1903

Species of beetle

Madahoplia niviscutata is a species of beetle of the family Scarabaeidae. It is found in Madagascar.

== Description ==
Adults reach a length of about 6–7 mm (0.24–0.28 in). They are similar to Madahoplia albosignata, but have a larger body. The upper surface is dark brown with a mixture of brown scales and some stronger white scales on the pronotum and elytra.
