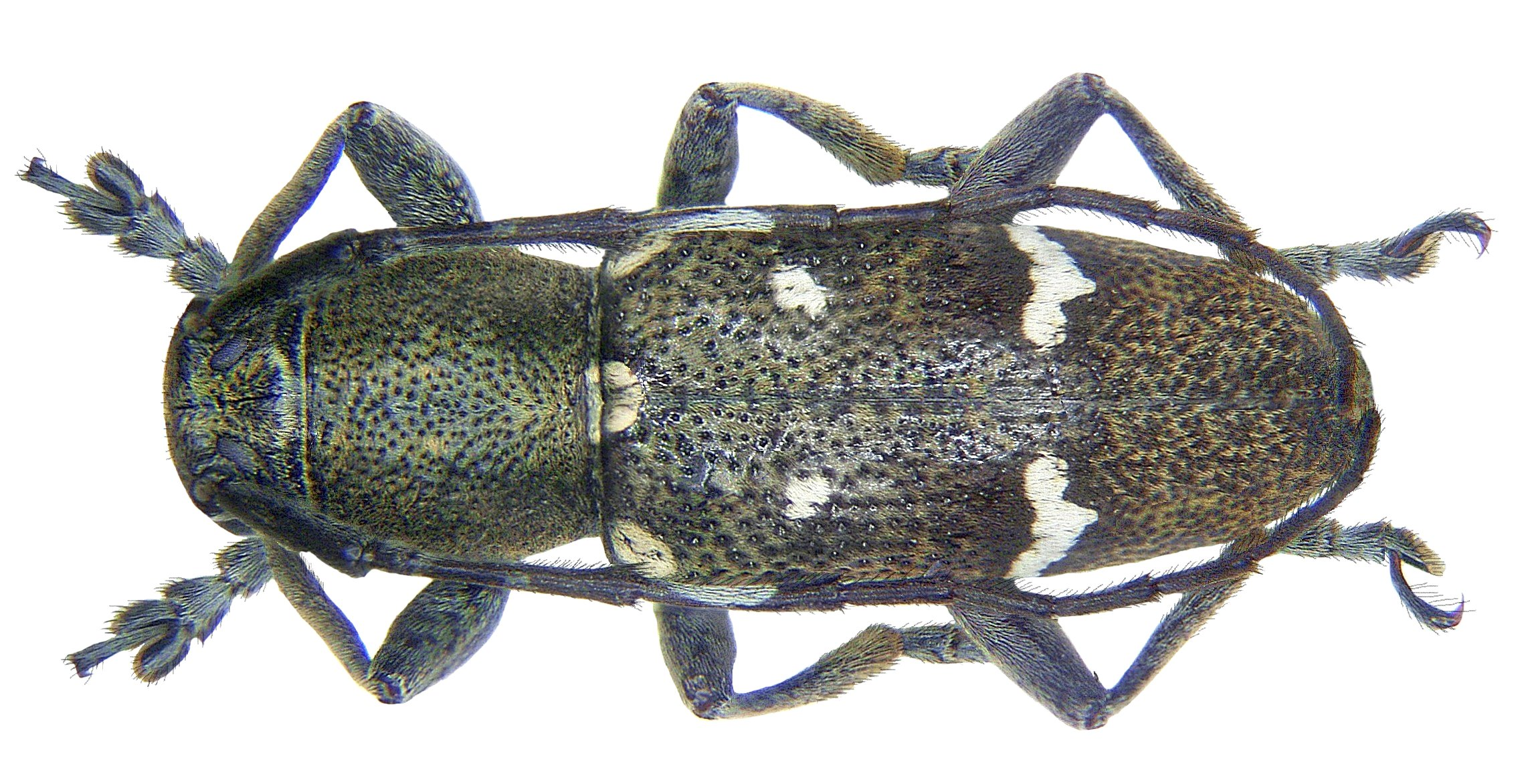

Scientific classification
- Kingdom: Animalia
- Phylum: Arthropoda
- Clade: Pancrustacea
- Class: Insecta
- Order: Coleoptera
- Suborder: Polyphaga
- Infraorder: Cucujiformia
- Family: Cerambycidae
- Genus: Parastesilea
- Species: P. scutellaris

Binomial name
- Parastesilea scutellaris (Pascoe, 1865)

Synonyms
- Stesilea scutellaris Pascoe, 1865

= Parastesilea scutellaris =

Species of beetle

Parastesilea scutellaris is a species of beetle in the family Cerambycidae. It was described by Francis Polkinghorne Pascoe in 1865, originally under the genus Stesilea. It is known from Sulawesi.
