= Maladera rufescens =

Scientific classification
- Kingdom: Animalia
- Phylum: Arthropoda
- Class: Insecta
- Order: Coleoptera
- Suborder: Polyphaga
- Infraorder: Scarabaeiformia
- Family: Scarabaeidae
- Genus: Maladera
- Species: M. rufescens

Binomial name
- Maladera rufescens (Nonfried, 1894)

Synonyms
- Serica rufescens Nonfried, 1894

Species of beetle

Maladera rufescens is a species of beetle of the family Scarabaeidae. It is found in Indonesia (Sumatra) and Malaysia.

== Description ==
Adults reach a length of about 7-8.5 mm. They are golden yellow, dull and opalescent, the upper surface with scattered strong setae. The clypeus is broad, scarcely tapering anteriorly, somewhat dull-punctate, with single setae laterally. Frons has a row of setae behind the suture. The pronotum is transverse, slightly convex, with a central projection on the anterior margin, the lateral margin is almost straight and distinctly setate, and the surface is rather densely punctured with 4–6 strong setae. The elytra are distinctly punctured in rows, the intervals flat, sparsely punctured, with scattered strong setae. The pygidium is slightly rounded.
