= Megapsyrassa atkinsoni =

Scientific classification
- Kingdom: Animalia
- Phylum: Arthropoda
- Class: Insecta
- Order: Coleoptera
- Suborder: Polyphaga
- Infraorder: Cucujiformia
- Family: Cerambycidae
- Genus: Megapsyrassa
- Species: M. atkinsoni

Binomial name
- Megapsyrassa atkinsoni Chemsak & Giesbert, 1986

Species of beetle

Megapsyrassa atkinsoni is a species of beetle in the family Cerambycidae. It was described by Chemsak and Giesbert in 1986.
