= Juiaparus punctulatus =

Scientific classification
- Domain: Eukaryota
- Kingdom: Animalia
- Phylum: Arthropoda
- Class: Insecta
- Order: Coleoptera
- Suborder: Polyphaga
- Infraorder: Cucujiformia
- Family: Cerambycidae
- Subfamily: Cerambycinae
- Tribe: Cerambycini
- Genus: Juiaparus
- Species: J. punctulatus

Binomial name
- Juiaparus punctulatus (Gahan, 1892)

Synonyms
- Brasilianus punctulatus Fragoso, 1982; Hamaticherus punctulatus Aurivillius, 1912; Hammaticherus punctulatus Gahan, 1892

Species of beetle

Juiaparus punctulatus is a species in the longhorn beetle family Cerambycidae. It is found in Brazil.
