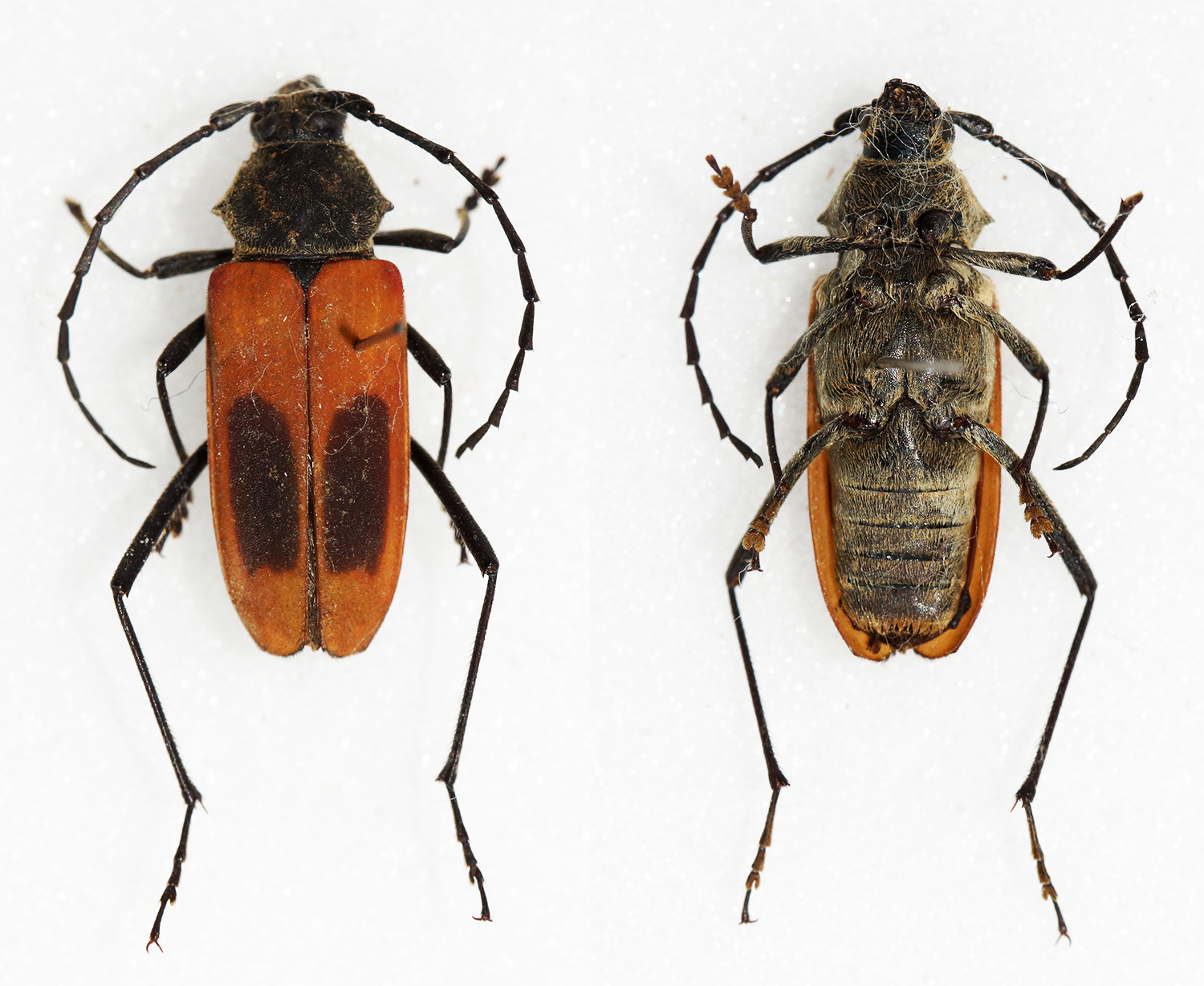

Scientific classification
- Domain: Eukaryota
- Kingdom: Animalia
- Phylum: Arthropoda
- Class: Insecta
- Order: Coleoptera
- Suborder: Polyphaga
- Infraorder: Cucujiformia
- Family: Cerambycidae
- Genus: Metaleptus
- Species: M. angulatus

Binomial name
- Metaleptus angulatus (Chevrolat, 1834)

= Metaleptus angulatus =

Species of beetle

Metaleptus angulatus is a species of beetle in the family Cerambycidae. It was described by Chevrolat in 1834.
