= Zaeera detzneri =

Scientific classification
- Kingdom: Animalia
- Phylum: Arthropoda
- Clade: Pancrustacea
- Class: Insecta
- Order: Coleoptera
- Suborder: Polyphaga
- Infraorder: Cucujiformia
- Family: Cerambycidae
- Genus: Zaeera
- Species: Z. detzneri

Binomial name
- Zaeera detzneri Kriesche, 1923

Species of beetle

Zaeera detzneri is a species of beetle in the family Cerambycidae. It was described by Kriesche in 1923. It is known from Papua New Guinea.
