= Metaleptus lecontei =

Scientific classification
- Kingdom: Animalia
- Phylum: Arthropoda
- Class: Insecta
- Order: Coleoptera
- Suborder: Polyphaga
- Infraorder: Cucujiformia
- Family: Cerambycidae
- Genus: Metaleptus
- Species: M. lecontei

Binomial name
- Metaleptus lecontei (Casey, 1912)

Species of beetle

Metaleptus lecontei is a species of beetle in the family Cerambycidae. It was described by Casey in 1912.
