= Psyrassa sinaloae =

Scientific classification
- Kingdom: Animalia
- Phylum: Arthropoda
- Class: Insecta
- Order: Coleoptera
- Suborder: Polyphaga
- Infraorder: Cucujiformia
- Family: Cerambycidae
- Genus: Psyrassa
- Species: P. sinaloae

Binomial name
- Psyrassa sinaloae Linsley, 1935

Species of beetle

Psyrassa sinaloae is a species of beetle in the family Cerambycidae.
