= Madahoplia circumscutata =

Scientific classification
- Kingdom: Animalia
- Phylum: Arthropoda
- Class: Insecta
- Order: Coleoptera
- Suborder: Polyphaga
- Infraorder: Scarabaeiformia
- Family: Scarabaeidae
- Genus: Madahoplia
- Species: M. circumscutata

Binomial name
- Madahoplia circumscutata (Fairmaire, 1903)

Synonyms
- Hoplia circumscutata Blanchard, 1903

Species of beetle

Madahoplia circumscutata is a species of beetle of the family Scarabaeidae. It is found in Madagascar.

== Description ==
Adults reach a length of about 5 mm (0.20 in). They have an enlarged body. The upper surface is reddish-brown with round and white scales.
