= Clodia sublineata =

Scientific classification
- Kingdom: Animalia
- Phylum: Arthropoda
- Class: Insecta
- Order: Coleoptera
- Suborder: Polyphaga
- Infraorder: Cucujiformia
- Family: Cerambycidae
- Subfamily: Lamiinae
- Tribe: Acanthocinini
- Genus: Clodia
- Species: C. sublineata

Binomial name
- Clodia sublineata Pascoe, 1864

Species of beetle

Clodia sublineata is a species of Long-Horned Beetle in the beetle family Cerambycidae. It is found in Maluku, Indonesia.
