= Madahoplia oculata =

Scientific classification
- Kingdom: Animalia
- Phylum: Arthropoda
- Class: Insecta
- Order: Coleoptera
- Suborder: Polyphaga
- Infraorder: Scarabaeiformia
- Family: Scarabaeidae
- Genus: Madahoplia
- Species: M. oculata

Binomial name
- Madahoplia oculata Lacroix, 1998

Species of beetle

Madahoplia oculata is a species of beetle of the family Scarabaeidae. It is found in Madagascar.

== Description ==
Adults reach a length of about 5–6 mm (0.20–0.24 in). They have a short, broadened body. The upper surface is dark brown with oval, yellow scaling.
