= Madahoplia heydeli =

Scientific classification
- Kingdom: Animalia
- Phylum: Arthropoda
- Class: Insecta
- Order: Coleoptera
- Suborder: Polyphaga
- Infraorder: Scarabaeiformia
- Family: Scarabaeidae
- Genus: Madahoplia
- Species: M. heydeli

Binomial name
- Madahoplia heydeli Lacroix, 1998

Species of beetle

Madahoplia heydeli is a species of beetle of the family Scarabaeidae. It is found in Madagascar.

== Description ==
Adults reach a length of about 4.5 mm (0.18 in). They have an oval, broad body. The upper surface is reddish-brown with elongated, loosely spaced, yellowish scales.
