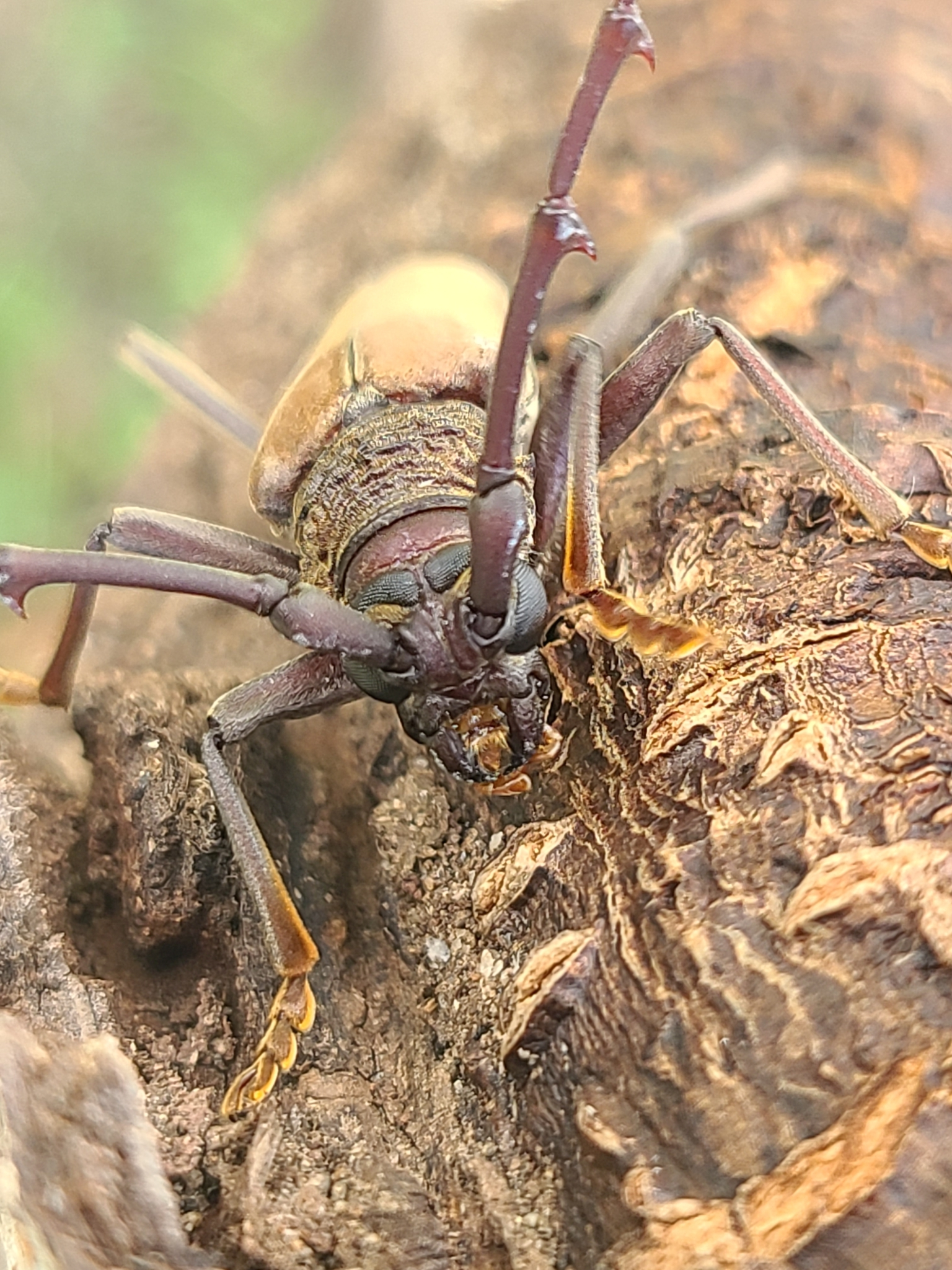
- Juiaparus mexicanus, México

Scientific classification
- Domain: Eukaryota
- Kingdom: Animalia
- Phylum: Arthropoda
- Class: Insecta
- Order: Coleoptera
- Suborder: Polyphaga
- Infraorder: Cucujiformia
- Family: Cerambycidae
- Subfamily: Cerambycinae
- Tribe: Cerambycini
- Genus: Juiaparus
- Species: J. mexicanus

Binomial name
- Juiaparus mexicanus (Thomson, 1861)

Synonyms
- Brasilianus mexicanus Terrón, 1997; Hamaticherus castaneus Zikán & Zikán, 1944; Hamaticherus mexicanus Aurivillius, 1912; Hammaticherus castaneus Bates, 1879; Hammaticherus mexicanus LeConte, 1873; Hammatochaerus castaneus Gemminger & Harold, 1872; Hammatochaerus mexicanus Gemminger & Harold, 1872; Juiparus mexicanus Martins, Galileo & Limeira-de-Oliveira, 2009

= Juiaparus mexicanus =

Species of beetle

Juiaparus mexicanus is a species in the longhorn beetle family Cerambycidae. It is found in Mexico, Central America, and South America.
