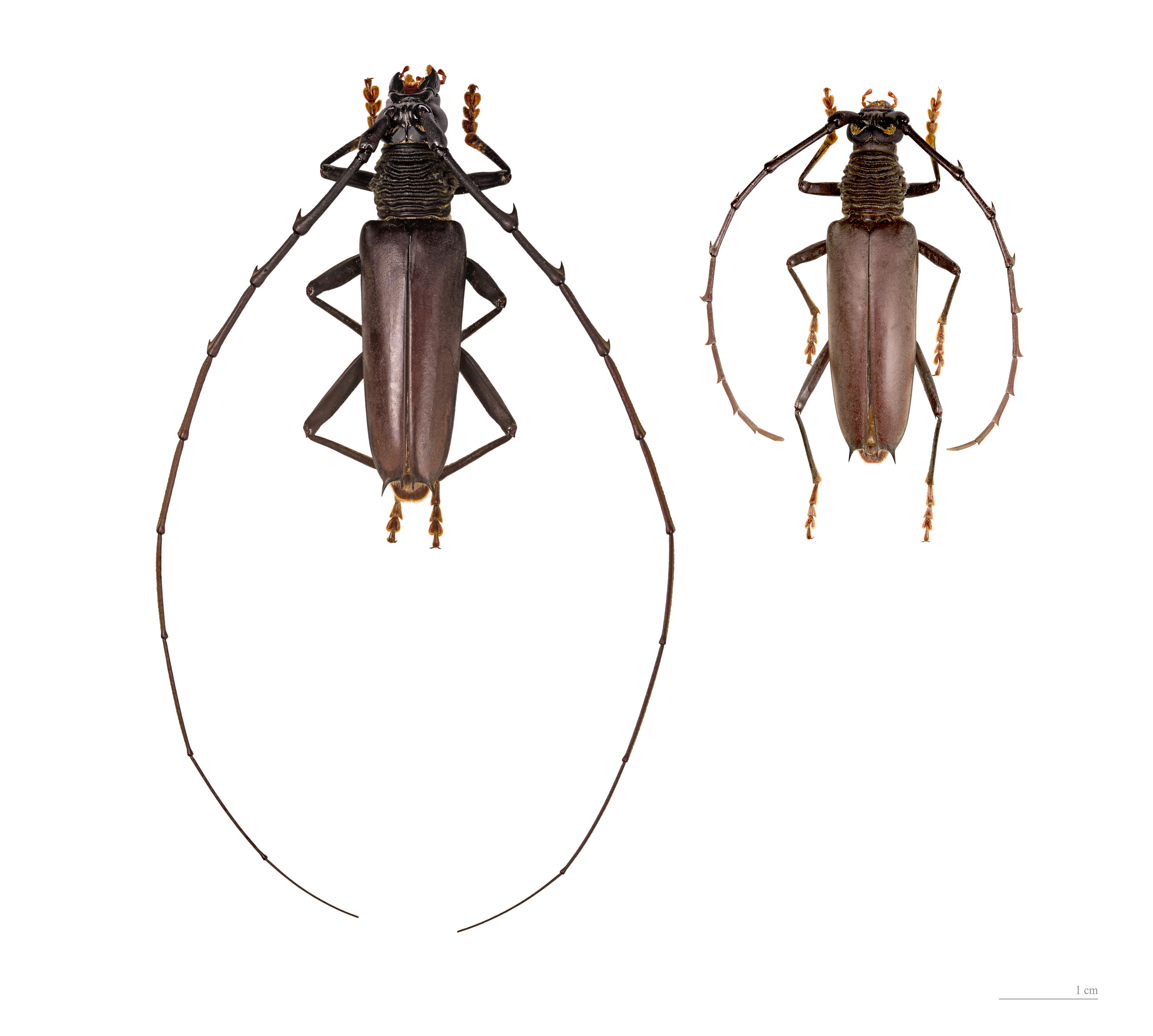

Scientific classification
- Kingdom: Animalia
- Phylum: Arthropoda
- Class: Insecta
- Order: Coleoptera
- Suborder: Polyphaga
- Infraorder: Cucujiformia
- Family: Cerambycidae
- Genus: Juiaparus
- Species: J. batus

Binomial name
- Juiaparus batus (Linnaeus, 1758)

= Juiaparus batus =

Species of beetle

Juiaparus batus is a species of beetle in the family Cerambycidae.
