= Paramorphochelus martinius =

Scientific classification
- Kingdom: Animalia
- Phylum: Arthropoda
- Class: Insecta
- Order: Coleoptera
- Suborder: Polyphaga
- Infraorder: Scarabaeiformia
- Family: Scarabaeidae
- Genus: Paramorphochelus
- Species: P. martinius

Binomial name
- Paramorphochelus martinius (Fairmaire, 1898)

Synonyms
- Hoplia martinia Fairmaire, 1898

Species of beetle

Paramorphochelus martinius is a species of beetle of the family Scarabaeidae. It is found in Madagascar.

== Description ==
Adults reach a length of about 6–7 mm (0.24–0.28 in). The upper surface is reddish-brown with fairly dense, regular, uniform, scaly hairs.
