= Serica tantula =

Scientific classification
- Kingdom: Animalia
- Phylum: Arthropoda
- Class: Insecta
- Order: Coleoptera
- Suborder: Polyphaga
- Infraorder: Scarabaeiformia
- Family: Scarabaeidae
- Genus: Serica
- Species: S. tantula

Binomial name
- Serica tantula Dawson, 1922

Species of beetle

Serica tantula is a species of beetle of the family Scarabaeidae. It is found in the United States (Florida).

== Description ==
Adults are very similar to Serica elongata, but the eyes are smaller, the antennal club is slightly shorter and the elytral striae are less sharply defined or line-like and with their punctures irregularly arranged.
