= Megapsyrassa puncticollis =

Scientific classification
- Kingdom: Animalia
- Phylum: Arthropoda
- Class: Insecta
- Order: Coleoptera
- Suborder: Polyphaga
- Infraorder: Cucujiformia
- Family: Cerambycidae
- Genus: Megapsyrassa
- Species: M. puncticollis

Binomial name
- Megapsyrassa puncticollis (Chemsak & Linsley, 1963)

Species of beetle

Megapsyrassa puncticollis is a species of beetle in the family Cerambycidae. It was described by Chemsak and Linsley in 1963.
