= Parastesilea alboscutellaris =

Scientific classification
- Kingdom: Animalia
- Phylum: Arthropoda
- Class: Insecta
- Order: Coleoptera
- Suborder: Polyphaga
- Infraorder: Cucujiformia
- Family: Cerambycidae
- Genus: Parastesilea
- Species: P. alboscutellaris

Binomial name
- Parastesilea alboscutellaris Breuning, 1968

Species of beetle

Parastesilea alboscutellaris is a species of beetle in the family Cerambycidae. It was described by Stephan von Breuning in 1968.
