= Paramorphochelus brochus =

Scientific classification
- Kingdom: Animalia
- Phylum: Arthropoda
- Class: Insecta
- Order: Coleoptera
- Suborder: Polyphaga
- Infraorder: Scarabaeiformia
- Family: Scarabaeidae
- Genus: Paramorphochelus
- Species: P. brochus

Binomial name
- Paramorphochelus brochus Lacroix, 1997

Species of beetle

Paramorphochelus brochus is a species of beetle of the family Scarabaeidae. It is found in Madagascar.

== Description ==
Adults reach a length of about 4–4.5 mm (0.16–0.18 in). They have a slender, elongated body. The upper surface is orange-yellow with darker mottled elytra and with fine, dense, regular hairs.
