= Metaleptus batesi =

Scientific classification
- Domain: Eukaryota
- Kingdom: Animalia
- Phylum: Arthropoda
- Class: Insecta
- Order: Coleoptera
- Suborder: Polyphaga
- Infraorder: Cucujiformia
- Family: Cerambycidae
- Genus: Metaleptus
- Species: M. batesi

Binomial name
- Metaleptus batesi Horn, 1885

Species of beetle

Metaleptus batesi is a species of beetle in the family Cerambycidae. It was described by George Henry Horn in 1885.
