= Zaeera =

Scientific classification
- Domain: Eukaryota
- Kingdom: Animalia
- Phylum: Arthropoda
- Class: Insecta
- Order: Coleoptera
- Suborder: Polyphaga
- Infraorder: Cucujiformia
- Family: Cerambycidae
- Tribe: Pteropliini
- Genus: Zaeera

Genus of beetles

Zaeera is a genus of longhorn beetles of the subfamily Lamiinae, containing the following species:

- Zaeera cretata Pascoe, 1865
- Zaeera detzneri Kriesche, 1923
- Zaeera ocellata Breuning, 1938
- Zaeera pulcherrima Nonfried, 1894
