= Criodion torticolle =

Scientific classification
- Domain: Eukaryota
- Kingdom: Animalia
- Phylum: Arthropoda
- Class: Insecta
- Order: Coleoptera
- Suborder: Polyphaga
- Infraorder: Cucujiformia
- Family: Cerambycidae
- Subfamily: Cerambycinae
- Tribe: Cerambycini
- Genus: Criodion
- Species: C. torticolle

Binomial name
- Criodion torticolle Bates, 1870

Synonyms
- Criodion angustatum Di Iorio, 2004; Criodion cinereum Bosq, 1947

Species of beetle

Criodion torticolle is a species in the longhorn beetle family Cerambycidae. It is found in Argentina, Bolivia, Brazil, French Guiana, and Paraguay.
