= Psyrassaforma janzeni =

Scientific classification
- Kingdom: Animalia
- Phylum: Arthropoda
- Class: Insecta
- Order: Coleoptera
- Suborder: Polyphaga
- Infraorder: Cucujiformia
- Family: Cerambycidae
- Genus: Psyrassa
- Species: P. janzeni

Binomial name
- Psyrassa janzeni Chemsak, 1991

Species of beetle

Psyrassaforma janzeni is a species of beetle in the family Cerambycidae. It was described by Chemsak in 1991.
