= Stesilea prolata =

Scientific classification
- Kingdom: Animalia
- Phylum: Arthropoda
- Class: Insecta
- Order: Coleoptera
- Suborder: Polyphaga
- Infraorder: Cucujiformia
- Family: Cerambycidae
- Genus: Stesilea
- Species: S. prolata

Binomial name
- Stesilea prolata Pascoe, 1865

Species of beetle

Stesilea prolata is a species of beetle in the family Cerambycidae. It was described by Francis Polkinghorne Pascoe in 1865. It is known from Moluccas.

== Subspecies ==
- Stesilea prolata prolata Pascoe, 1865
- Stesilea prolata bangkeiensis Breuning, 1958
