= Criodion cinereum =

Scientific classification
- Kingdom: Animalia
- Phylum: Arthropoda
- Clade: Pancrustacea
- Class: Insecta
- Order: Coleoptera
- Suborder: Polyphaga
- Infraorder: Cucujiformia
- Family: Cerambycidae
- Subfamily: Cerambycinae
- Tribe: Cerambycini
- Genus: Criodion
- Species: C. cinereum

Binomial name
- Criodion cinereum (Olivier, 1795)

Synonyms
- Criodion cinereus Aurivillius, 1912; Prionus cinereus Raye, 1827

Species of beetle

Criodion cinereum is a species in the longhorn beetle family Cerambycidae. It is found in Colombia, Costa Rica, French Guiana, Suriname, Venezuela, and South America.
