= Madahoplia bicallosa =

Scientific classification
- Kingdom: Animalia
- Phylum: Arthropoda
- Class: Insecta
- Order: Coleoptera
- Suborder: Polyphaga
- Infraorder: Scarabaeiformia
- Family: Scarabaeidae
- Genus: Madahoplia
- Species: M. bicallosa

Binomial name
- Madahoplia bicallosa (Blanchard, 1850)

Synonyms
- Hoplia bicallosa Blanchard, 1850

Species of beetle

Madahoplia bicallosa is a species of beetle of the family Scarabaeidae. It is found in Madagascar.

== Description ==
Adults reach a length of about 5.5 mm (0.22 in). They have a narrow body. The upper surface is reddish-brown with fine, oval, white scales.
