= Clodia vittata =

Scientific classification
- Domain: Eukaryota
- Kingdom: Animalia
- Phylum: Arthropoda
- Class: Insecta
- Order: Coleoptera
- Suborder: Polyphaga
- Infraorder: Cucujiformia
- Family: Cerambycidae
- Subfamily: Lamiinae
- Tribe: Acanthocinini
- Genus: Clodia
- Species: C. vittata

Binomial name
- Clodia vittata Aurivillius, 1927

Synonyms
- Pseudoclodia vittata Breuning, 1957

Species of beetle

Clodia vittata is a species of Long-Horned Beetle in the beetle family Cerambycidae. It is found in The Philippines.

This species was described by Per Olof Christopher Aurivillius in 1927.
