= Paramorphochelus =

Scientific classification
- Kingdom: Animalia
- Phylum: Arthropoda
- Class: Insecta
- Order: Coleoptera
- Suborder: Polyphaga
- Infraorder: Scarabaeiformia
- Family: Scarabaeidae
- Subfamily: Melolonthinae
- Tribe: Hopliini
- Genus: Paramorphochelus; Lacroix, 1997

Synonyms
- Pseudodontoplia Lebis, 1961

Genus beetles

Paramorphochelus is a genus of beetles belonging to the family Scarabaeidae.

== Species ==
- Paramorphochelus agricola (Lebis, 1961)
- Paramorphochelus bidentulus (Fairmaire, 1901)
- Paramorphochelus brochus Lacroix, 1997
- Paramorphochelus ciliatus Lacroix, 1997
- Paramorphochelus cornutus (Nonfried, 1892)
- Paramorphochelus martinius (Fairmaire, 1898)
- Paramorphochelus mundus Lacroix, 1997
- Paramorphochelus seorsus Lacroix, 1997
- Paramorphochelus viettei Lacroix, 1997
