= Paramorphochelus ciliatus =

Scientific classification
- Kingdom: Animalia
- Phylum: Arthropoda
- Class: Insecta
- Order: Coleoptera
- Suborder: Polyphaga
- Infraorder: Scarabaeiformia
- Family: Scarabaeidae
- Genus: Paramorphochelus
- Species: P. ciliatus

Binomial name
- Paramorphochelus ciliatus Lacroix, 1997

Species of beetle

Paramorphochelus ciliatus is a species of beetle of the family Scarabaeidae. It is found in Madagascar.

== Description ==
Adults reach a length of about 5 mm (0.20 in). They have an elongated body. The upper surface is yellowish-brown with darker patches and with dense but sparse hair.
