= Stesilea laevifrons =

Scientific classification
- Domain: Eukaryota
- Kingdom: Animalia
- Phylum: Arthropoda
- Class: Insecta
- Order: Coleoptera
- Suborder: Polyphaga
- Infraorder: Cucujiformia
- Family: Cerambycidae
- Tribe: Pteropliini
- Genus: Stesilea
- Species: S. laevifrons

Binomial name
- Stesilea laevifrons Breunig, 1943

Species of beetle

Stesilea laevifrons is a species of beetle in the family Cerambycidae. It was described by Stephan von Breuning in 1943.
