= Clodia flavoguttata =

Scientific classification
- Kingdom: Animalia
- Phylum: Arthropoda
- Class: Insecta
- Order: Coleoptera
- Suborder: Polyphaga
- Infraorder: Cucujiformia
- Family: Cerambycidae
- Subfamily: Lamiinae
- Tribe: Acanthocinini
- Genus: Clodia
- Species: C. flavoguttata

Binomial name
- Clodia flavoguttata Breuning, 1957

Species of beetle

Clodia flavoguttata is a species of Long-Horned Beetle in the beetle family Cerambycidae. It is found in The Philippines.

This species was described by Breuning in 1957.
