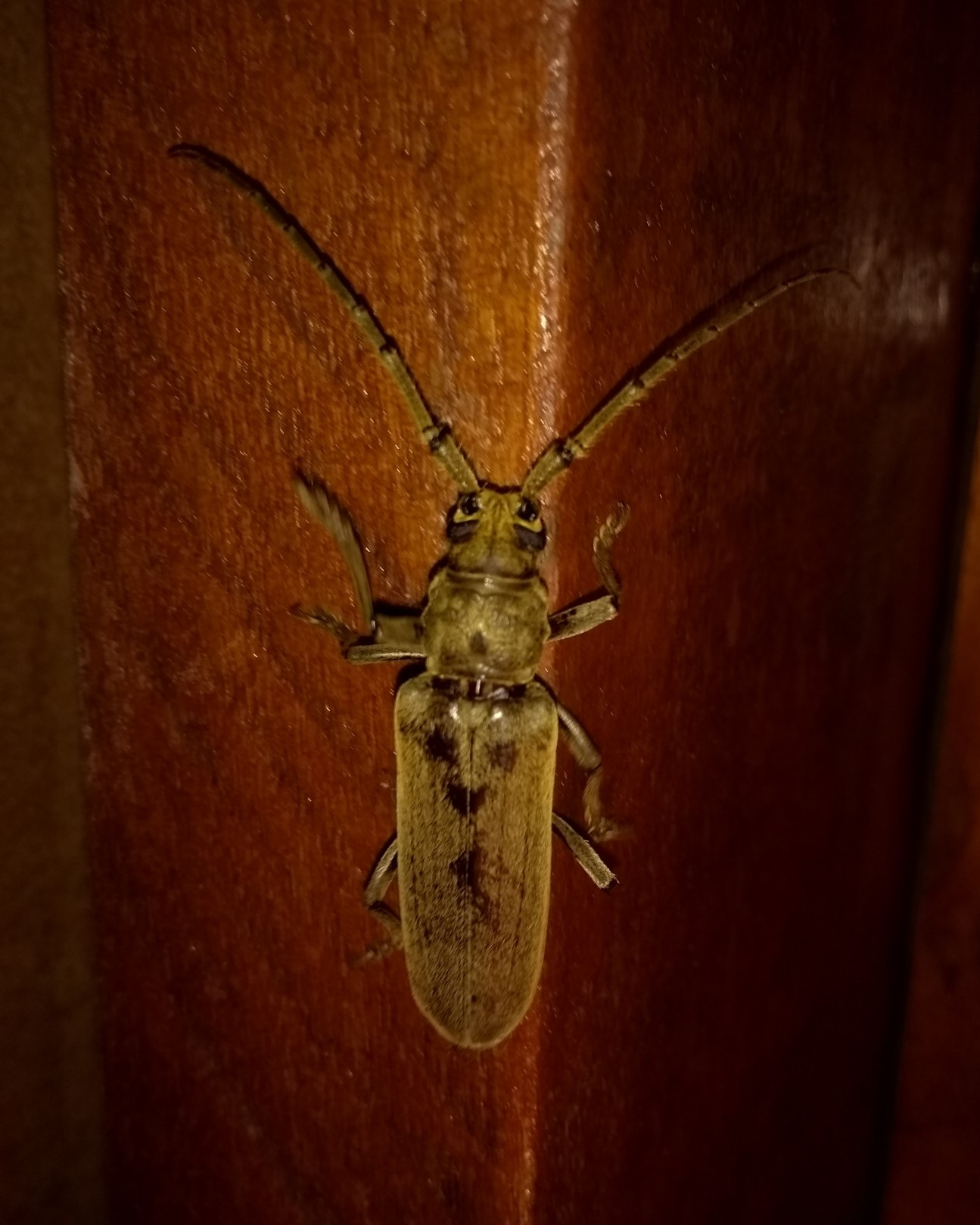
- Criodion tomentosum

Scientific classification
- Domain: Eukaryota
- Kingdom: Animalia
- Phylum: Arthropoda
- Class: Insecta
- Order: Coleoptera
- Suborder: Polyphaga
- Infraorder: Cucujiformia
- Family: Cerambycidae
- Subfamily: Cerambycinae
- Tribe: Cerambycini
- Genus: Criodion; Audinet-Serville, 1833

Synonyms
- Crioction Gounelle, 1909; Criodion Dejean, 1830; Criodium Agassiz, 1846; Criodon Chenu, 1870

= Criodion =

Genus of beetles

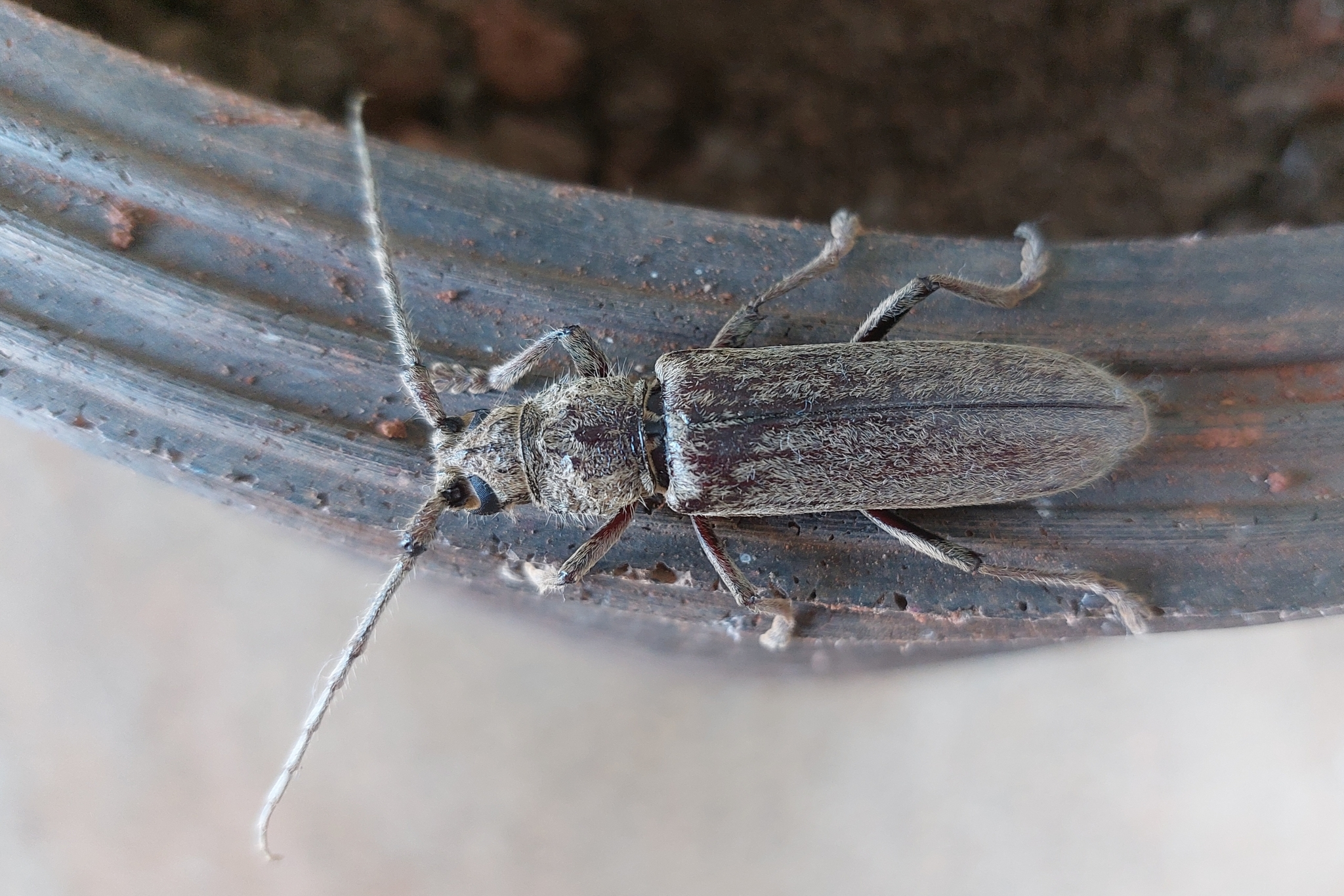
Criodion tomentosum, Brasil

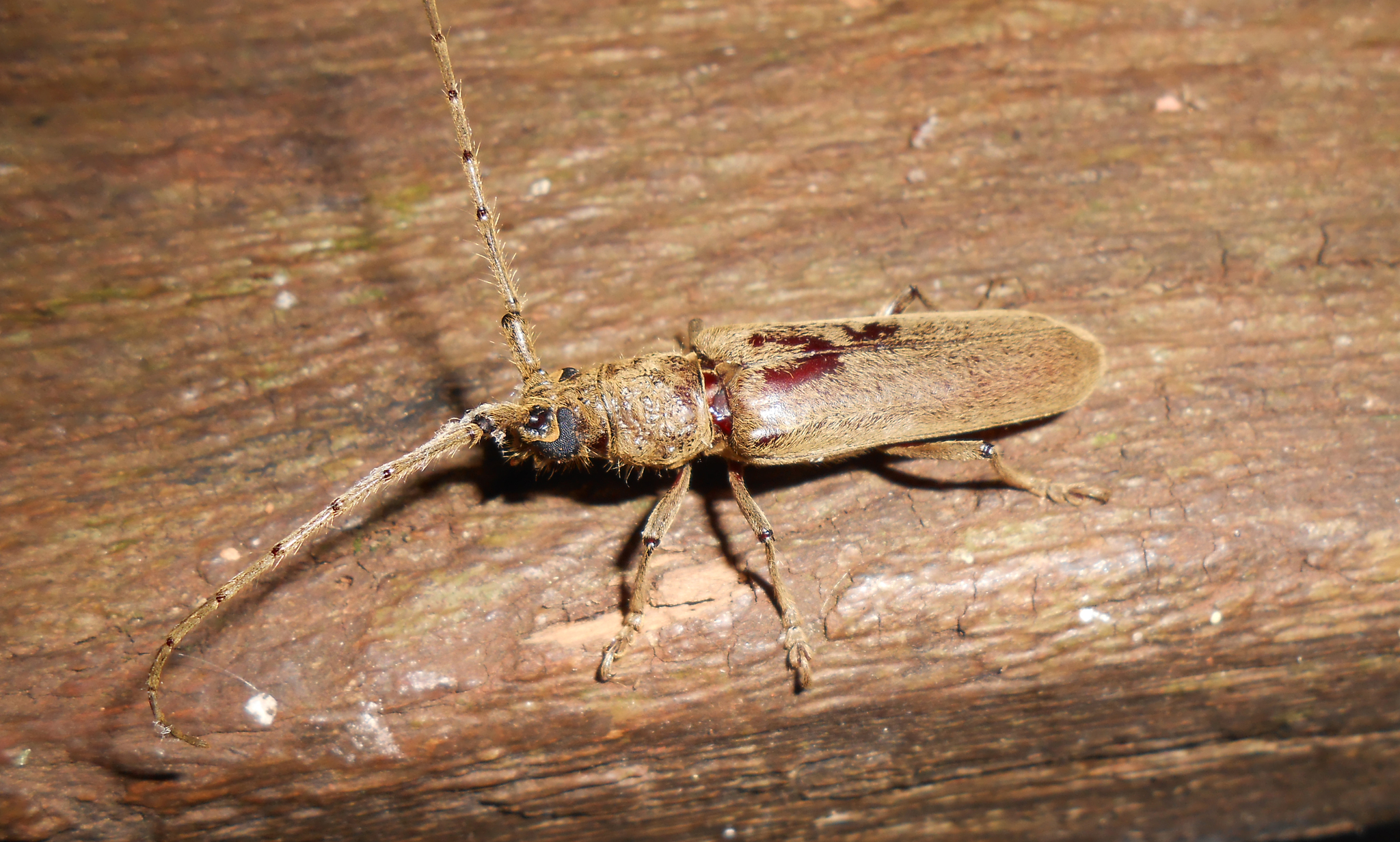
Criodion tomentosum, Argentina

Criodion is a genus of Long-Horned Beetles in the beetle family Cerambycidae. There are about 11 described species in Criodion.

Research in 2021 has placed species Criodion angustatum and Criodion pilosum as synonyms of Criodion tomentosum. Cerambycidae Database, Catalogue of Life, and New World Cerambycidae Catalog have accepted these changes.

== Species ==
These 11 species belong to the genus Criodion:

- Criodion antennatum Gahan, 1892 (Venezuela)
- Criodion cinereum (Olivier, 1795) (Central and South America)
- Criodion dejeani Gahan, 1892 (Brazil)
- Criodion fulvopilosum Gahan, 1892 (Brazil)
- Criodion murinum Nonfried, 1895 (Costa Rica)
- Criodion rhinoceros Bates, 1870 (Brazil, Ecuador, Peru)
- Criodion spinosum Galileo, Martins & Santos-Silva, 2015
- Criodion subpubescens Martins & Monné, 2005 (Brazil)
- Criodion tomentosum Audinet-Serville, 1834 (Argentina, Brazil, Paraguay)
- Criodion torticolle Bates, 1870 (Argentina, Bolivia, Brazil, French Guiana, and Paraguay)
- Criodion tuberculatum Gahan, 1892 (Ecuador, French Guiana, Bolivia, Peru, and Brazil)
