= Paramorphochelus bidentulus =

Scientific classification
- Kingdom: Animalia
- Phylum: Arthropoda
- Class: Insecta
- Order: Coleoptera
- Suborder: Polyphaga
- Infraorder: Scarabaeiformia
- Family: Scarabaeidae
- Genus: Paramorphochelus
- Species: P. bidentulus

Binomial name
- Paramorphochelus bidentulus (Fairmaire, 1901)

Synonyms
- Hoplia bidentula Fairmaire, 1901

Species of beetle

Paramorphochelus bidentulus is a species of beetle of the family Scarabaeidae. It is found in Madagascar.

== Description ==
Adults reach a length of about 6–6.5 mm (0.24–0.26 in). They have a not very elongated body. The upper surface is dark brown, with abundant, short hairs.
