= Madahoplia monotincta =

Scientific classification
- Kingdom: Animalia
- Phylum: Arthropoda
- Class: Insecta
- Order: Coleoptera
- Suborder: Polyphaga
- Infraorder: Scarabaeiformia
- Family: Scarabaeidae
- Genus: Madahoplia
- Species: M. monotincta

Binomial name
- Madahoplia monotincta Lacroix, 1998

Species of beetle

Madahoplia monotincta is a species of beetle of the family Scarabaeidae. It is found in Madagascar.

== Description ==
Adults reach a length of about 6–7 mm (0.24–0.28 in). They have a broad body. The upper surface is dark brown with elongated, white scales.
