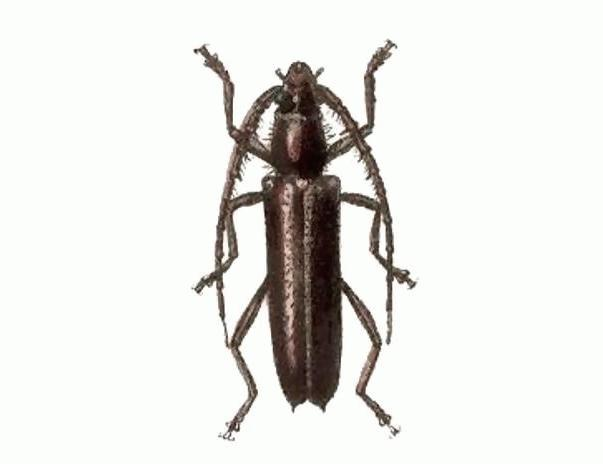

Scientific classification
- Kingdom: Animalia
- Phylum: Arthropoda
- Class: Insecta
- Order: Coleoptera
- Suborder: Polyphaga
- Infraorder: Cucujiformia
- Family: Cerambycidae
- Genus: Megapsyrassa
- Species: M. xestioides

Binomial name
- Megapsyrassa xestioides (Bates, 1872)

= Megapsyrassa xestioides =

Species of beetle

Megapsyrassa xestioides is a species of beetle in the family Cerambycidae. It was described by Bates in 1872.
