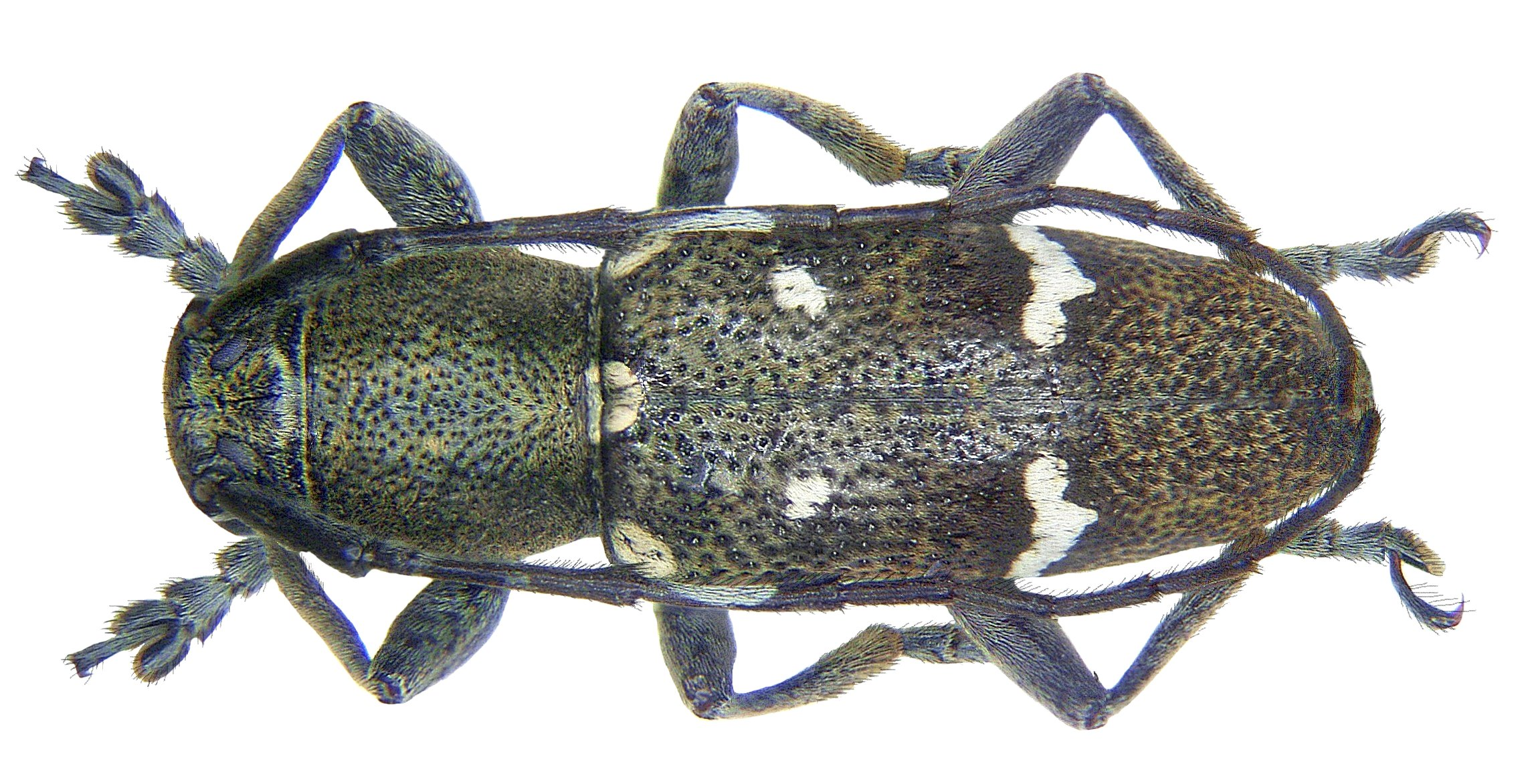
- Parastesilea scutellaris (Pascoe, 1865). Size: 12 mm

Scientific classification
- Domain: Eukaryota
- Kingdom: Animalia
- Phylum: Arthropoda
- Class: Insecta
- Order: Coleoptera
- Suborder: Polyphaga
- Infraorder: Cucujiformia
- Family: Cerambycidae
- Tribe: Pteropliini
- Genus: Parastesilea

= Parastesilea =

Genus of beetles

Parastesilea is a genus of longhorn beetles of the subfamily Lamiinae, containing the following species:

- Parastesilea alboscutellaris Breuning, 1968
- Parastesilea grisescens (Breuning, 1938)
- Parastesilea latefasciata (Breuning, 1938)
- Parastesilea scutellaris (Pascoe, 1865)
