= Paramorphochelus viettei =

Scientific classification
- Kingdom: Animalia
- Phylum: Arthropoda
- Class: Insecta
- Order: Coleoptera
- Suborder: Polyphaga
- Infraorder: Scarabaeiformia
- Family: Scarabaeidae
- Genus: Paramorphochelus
- Species: P. viettei

Binomial name
- Paramorphochelus viettei Lacroix, 1997

Species of beetle

Paramorphochelus viettei is a species of beetle of the family Scarabaeidae. It is found in Madagascar.

== Description ==
Adults reach a length of about 6 mm (0.24 in). They have an elongated body. The upper surface is testaceous brown, with fine and sparse hairs.
