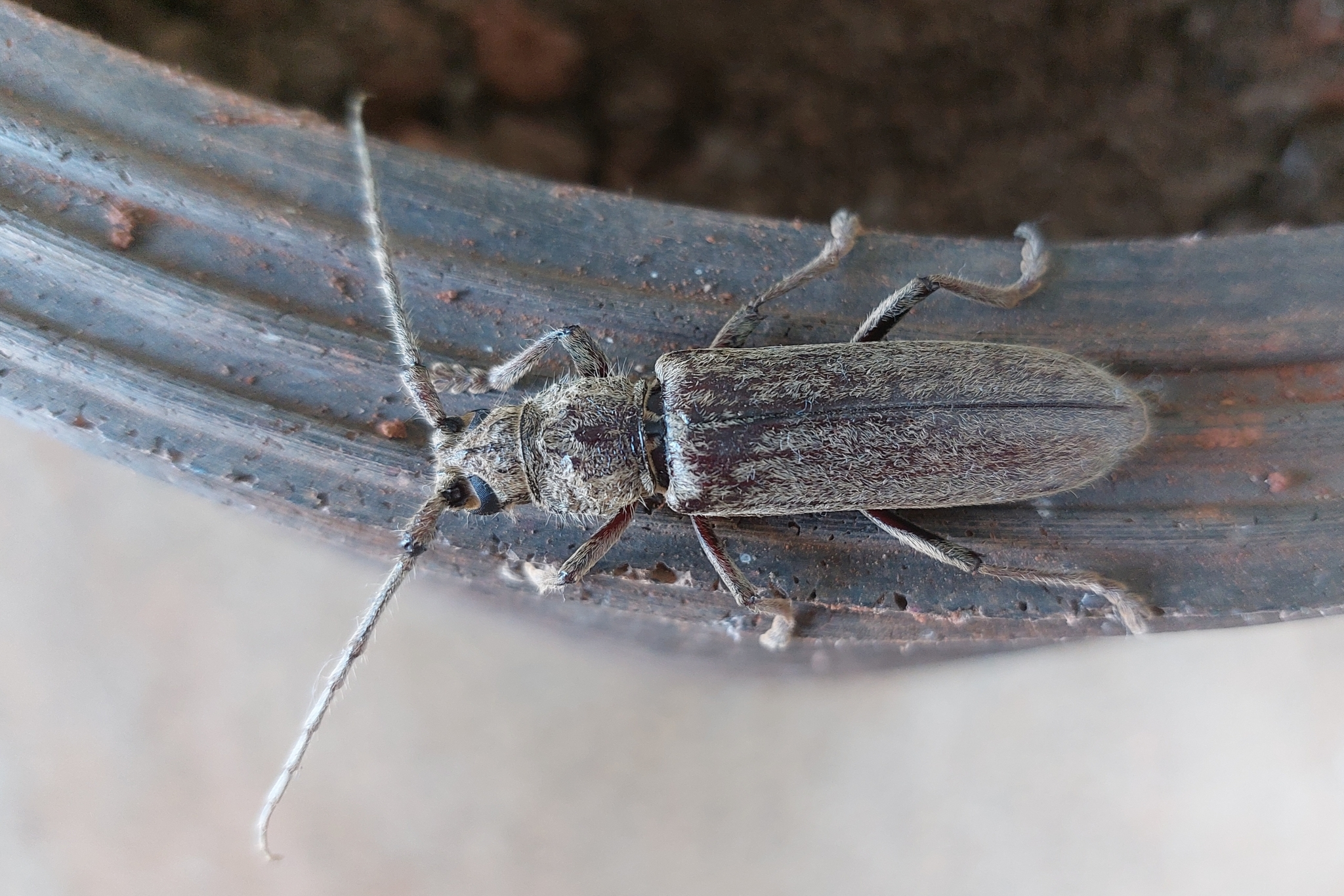
- Criodion tomentosum, Brasil

Scientific classification
- Domain: Eukaryota
- Kingdom: Animalia
- Phylum: Arthropoda
- Class: Insecta
- Order: Coleoptera
- Suborder: Polyphaga
- Infraorder: Cucujiformia
- Family: Cerambycidae
- Subfamily: Cerambycinae
- Tribe: Cerambycini
- Genus: Criodion
- Species: C. tomentosum

Binomial name
- Criodion tomentosum Audinet-Serville, 1833

Synonyms
- Criodion pilosum Lucas, 1859; Criodion angustatum Buquet, 1852; Criodion tomentosus Chenu, 1870; Criodion hirsutum Aurivillius, 1912; Cridion tomentosum Carvalho & Carvalho, 1939

= Criodion tomentosum =

Species of beetle

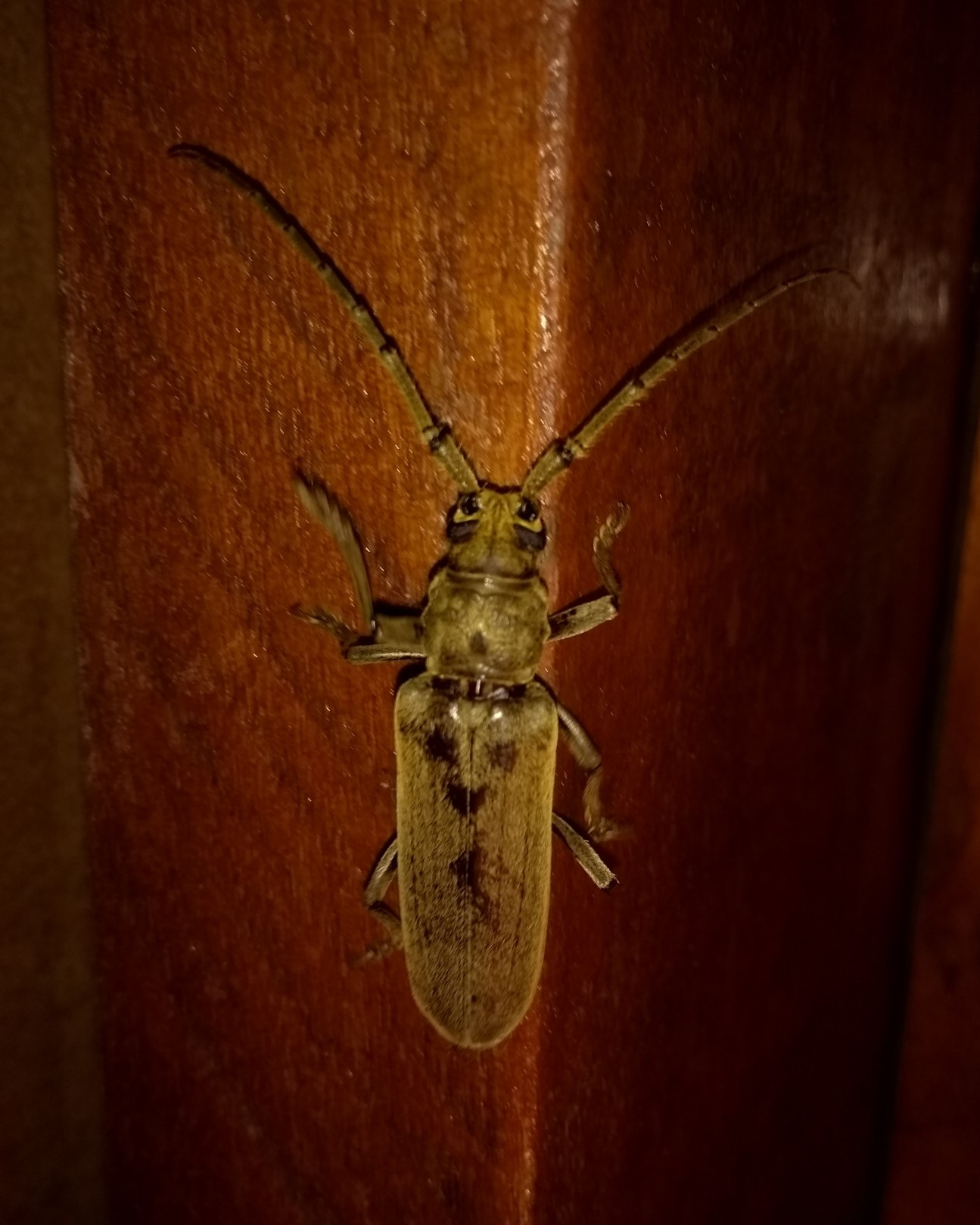
Criodion tomentosum

Criodion tomentosum is a species in the longhorn beetle family Cerambycidae. It is found in Brazil, Argentina, and Paraguay.

Research in 2021 has determined that species Criodion angustatum and Criodion pilosum are synonyms of Criodion tomentosum. Cerambycidae Database, Catalogue of Life, and New World Cerambycidae Catalog have accepted these changes.
