= Madahoplia =

Scientific classification
- Kingdom: Animalia
- Phylum: Arthropoda
- Class: Insecta
- Order: Coleoptera
- Suborder: Polyphaga
- Infraorder: Scarabaeiformia
- Family: Scarabaeidae
- Subfamily: Melolonthinae
- Tribe: Hopliini
- Genus: Madahoplia; Lacroix, 1998

Genus beetles

Madahoplia is a genus of beetles belonging to the family Scarabaeidae.

== Species ==
- Madahoplia albosignata (Nonfried, 1895)
- Madahoplia alluaudi Lacroix, 1998
- Madahoplia biapicata (Fairmaire, 1897)
- Madahoplia bicallosa (Blanchard, 1850)
- Madahoplia cervinotincta (Fairmaire, 1901)
- Madahoplia circumscutata (Fairmaire, 1903)
- Madahoplia griseosetosa (Fairmaire, 1897)
- Madahoplia heydeli Lacroix, 1998
- Madahoplia monotincta Lacroix, 1998
- Madahoplia niviscutata (Fairmaire, 1903)
- Madahoplia nodipennis (Burmeister, 1844)
- Madahoplia oculata Lacroix, 1998
- Madahoplia robinsoni Lacroix, 1998
- Madahoplia scutellata (Fairmaire, 1897)
- Madahoplia terminalis (Fairmaire, 1901)
