= Criodion rhinoceros =

Scientific classification
- Domain: Eukaryota
- Kingdom: Animalia
- Phylum: Arthropoda
- Class: Insecta
- Order: Coleoptera
- Suborder: Polyphaga
- Infraorder: Cucujiformia
- Family: Cerambycidae
- Subfamily: Cerambycinae
- Tribe: Cerambycini
- Genus: Criodion
- Species: C. rhinoceros

Binomial name
- Criodion rhinoceros Bates, 1870

Synonyms
- Criodion rhinocerus Fragoso, 1982

Species of beetle

Criodion rhinoceros is a species in the longhorn beetle family Cerambycidae. It is found in Brazil, Ecuador, and Peru.
