= Madahoplia albosignata =

Scientific classification
- Kingdom: Animalia
- Phylum: Arthropoda
- Class: Insecta
- Order: Coleoptera
- Suborder: Polyphaga
- Infraorder: Scarabaeiformia
- Family: Scarabaeidae
- Genus: Madahoplia
- Species: M. albosignata

Binomial name
- Madahoplia albosignata (Nonfried, 1895)

Synonyms
- Hoplia albosignata Nonfried, 1895

Species of beetle

Madahoplia albosignata is a species of beetle of the family Scarabaeidae. It is found in Madagascar.

== Description ==
Adults reach a length of about 6 mm (0.24 in). They have a rather elongated body. The upper surface is blackish with a mixture of brown scales and larger white scales on the pronotum.
