= Megapsyrassa =

Scientific classification
- Kingdom: Animalia
- Phylum: Arthropoda
- Class: Insecta
- Order: Coleoptera
- Suborder: Polyphaga
- Infraorder: Cucujiformia
- Family: Cerambycidae
- Tribe: Elaphidiini
- Genus: Megapsyrassa

Genus of beetles

Megapsyrassa is a genus of beetles in the family Cerambycidae, containing the following species:

The genus is invalid (after 2022) as was synonymised with Psyrassa by Garcia, & Santos-Silva in 2022, and two species were subsequently renamed due to creation of homonyms.

- Megapsyrassa atkinsoni Chemsak & Giesbert, 1986
- Megapsyrassa auricomis (Chemsak & Linsley, 1963)
- Megapsyrassa chiapaneca Giesbert, 1993
- Megapsyrassa linsleyi Chemsak & Giesbert, 1986
- Megapsyrassa puncticollis (Chemsak & Linsley, 1963)
- Megapsyrassa testacea Giesbert, 1993
- Megapsyrassa xestioides (Bates, 1872)
