= Madahoplia nodipennis =

Scientific classification
- Kingdom: Animalia
- Phylum: Arthropoda
- Class: Insecta
- Order: Coleoptera
- Suborder: Polyphaga
- Infraorder: Scarabaeiformia
- Family: Scarabaeidae
- Genus: Madahoplia
- Species: M. nodipennis

Binomial name
- Madahoplia nodipennis (Burmeister, 1844)

Synonyms
- Hoplia nodipennis Burmeister, 1844

Species of beetle

Madahoplia nodipennis is a species of beetle of the family Scarabaeidae. It is found in Madagascar.

== Description ==
Adults reach a length of about 4–5 mm (0.16–0.20 in). They have a narrow body. The upper surface is yellowish-brown with oval, white scales.
