= Madahoplia cervinotincta =

Scientific classification
- Kingdom: Animalia
- Phylum: Arthropoda
- Class: Insecta
- Order: Coleoptera
- Suborder: Polyphaga
- Infraorder: Scarabaeiformia
- Family: Scarabaeidae
- Genus: Madahoplia
- Species: M. cervinotincta

Binomial name
- Madahoplia cervinotincta (Fairmaire, 1901)

Synonyms
- Hoplia cervinotincta Blanchard, 1901

Species of beetle

Madahoplia cervinotincta is a species of beetle of the family Scarabaeidae. It is found in Madagascar.

== Description ==
Adults reach a length of about 5–6 mm (0.20–0.24 in). They have a strong, enlarged body. The upper surface has dense, round, yellow scales.
