= Psyrassa chamelae =

Scientific classification
- Kingdom: Animalia
- Phylum: Arthropoda
- Class: Insecta
- Order: Coleoptera
- Suborder: Polyphaga
- Infraorder: Cucujiformia
- Family: Cerambycidae
- Genus: Psyrassa
- Species: P. chamelae

Binomial name
- Psyrassa chamelae Toledo, 2006

Species of beetle

Psyrassa chamelae is a species of beetle in the family Cerambycidae.

The scientific name of the species was first validly published in 2006 by Toledo
