= Madahoplia biapicata =

Scientific classification
- Kingdom: Animalia
- Phylum: Arthropoda
- Class: Insecta
- Order: Coleoptera
- Suborder: Polyphaga
- Infraorder: Scarabaeiformia
- Family: Scarabaeidae
- Genus: Madahoplia
- Species: M. biapicata

Binomial name
- Madahoplia biapicata (Fairmaire, 1897)

Synonyms
- Hoplia biapicata Fairmaire, 1897

Species of beetle

Madahoplia biapicata is a species of beetle of the family Scarabaeidae. It is found in Madagascar.

== Description ==
Adults reach a length of about 5.5–6.5 mm (0.22–0.26 in). They have a short, enlarged body. The upper surface is dark brown densely covered with oval, yellow scales.
