= Stesilea celebensis =

Scientific classification
- Kingdom: Animalia
- Phylum: Arthropoda
- Class: Insecta
- Order: Coleoptera
- Suborder: Polyphaga
- Infraorder: Cucujiformia
- Family: Cerambycidae
- Genus: Stesilea
- Species: S. celebensis

Binomial name
- Stesilea celebensis Breuning, 1962

Species of beetle

Stesilea celebensis is a species of beetle in the family Cerambycidae. It was described by Stephan von Breuning in 1962.
