= Madahoplia terminalis =

Scientific classification
- Kingdom: Animalia
- Phylum: Arthropoda
- Class: Insecta
- Order: Coleoptera
- Suborder: Polyphaga
- Infraorder: Scarabaeiformia
- Family: Scarabaeidae
- Genus: Madahoplia
- Species: M. terminalis

Binomial name
- Madahoplia terminalis (Fairmaire, 1901)

Synonyms
- Hoplia terminalis Fairmaire, 1901

Species of beetle

Madahoplia terminalis is a species of beetle of the family Scarabaeidae. It is found in Madagascar.

== Description ==
Adults reach a length of about 4.5–5 mm (0.18–0.20 in). They have a short, narrow body. The upper surface is reddish-brown with oval, yellow scales.
