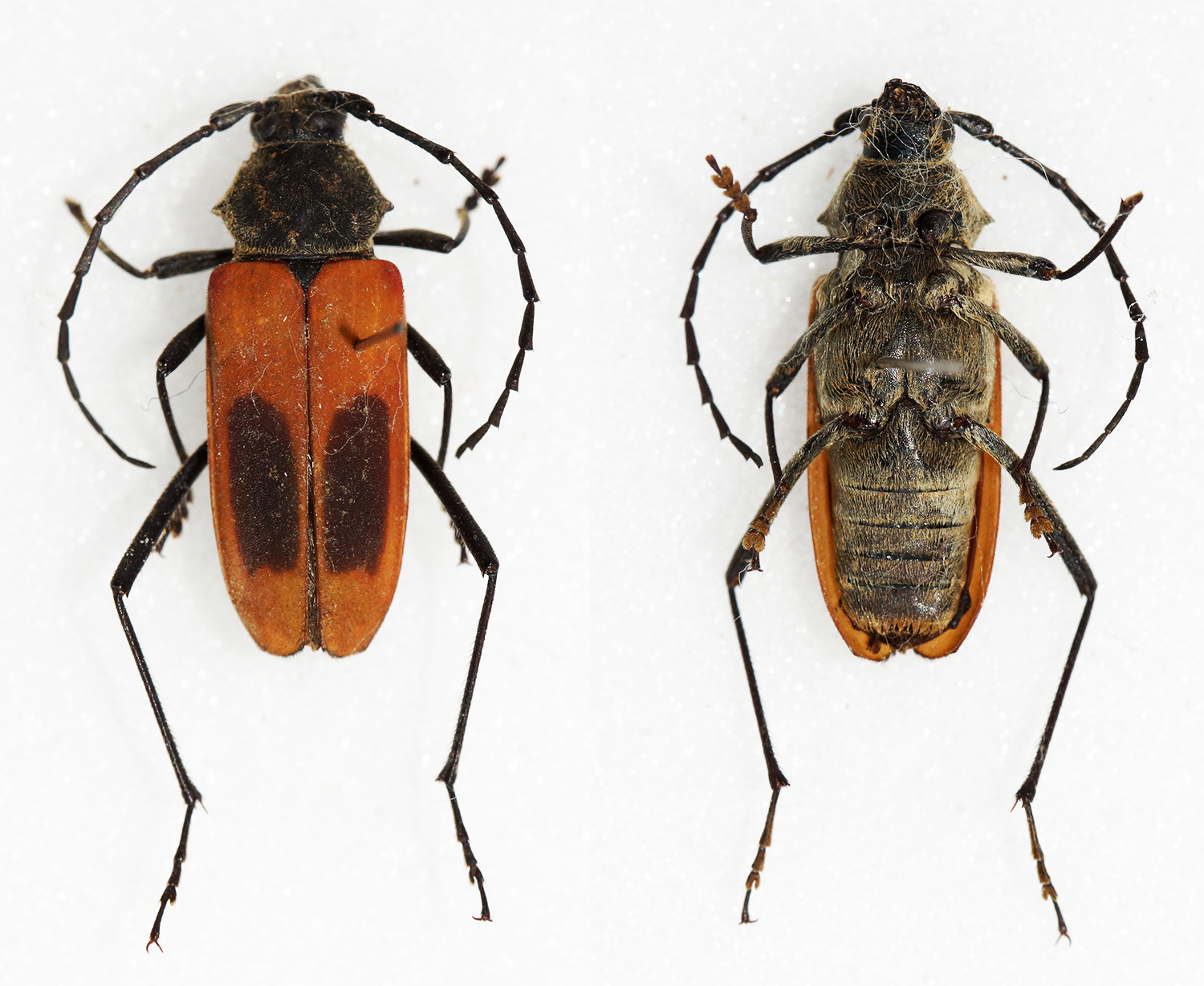
- Metaleptus angulatus

Scientific classification
- Domain: Eukaryota
- Kingdom: Animalia
- Phylum: Arthropoda
- Class: Insecta
- Order: Coleoptera
- Suborder: Polyphaga
- Infraorder: Cucujiformia
- Family: Cerambycidae
- Subfamily: Cerambycinae
- Tribe: Trachyderini
- Genus: Metaleptus; Bates, 1872

= Metaleptus =

Genus of beetles

Metaleptus is a genus of beetles in the family Cerambycidae, containing the following species:

- Metaleptus angulatus (Chevrolat, 1834)
- Metaleptus batesi Horn, 1885
- Metaleptus brasiliensis (Schaufuss, 1871)
- Metaleptus hondurae Nonfried, 1894
- Metaleptus lecontei (Casey, 1912)
- Metaleptus pyrrhulus Bates, 1880
