= Clodia (beetle) =

Scientific classification
- Domain: Eukaryota
- Kingdom: Animalia
- Phylum: Arthropoda
- Class: Insecta
- Order: Coleoptera
- Suborder: Polyphaga
- Infraorder: Cucujiformia
- Family: Cerambycidae
- Subfamily: Lamiinae
- Tribe: Acanthocinini
- Genus: Clodia; Pascoe, 1864

Genus of beetles

Clodia is a genus of Long-Horned Beetles in the beetle family Cerambycidae. There are about five described species in Clodia, found in Indonesia and The Philippines.

== Species ==
These five species belong to the genus Clodia:

- Clodia biflavoguttata Breuning, 1959 (Philippines)
- Clodia decorata Nonfried, 1894 (Indonesia (Sumatra))
- Clodia flavoguttata Breuning, 1957 (Philippines (Luzon))
- Clodia sublineata Pascoe, 1864 (Indonesia (Maluku Islands))
- Clodia vittata Aurivillius, 1927 (Philippines (Luzon))
