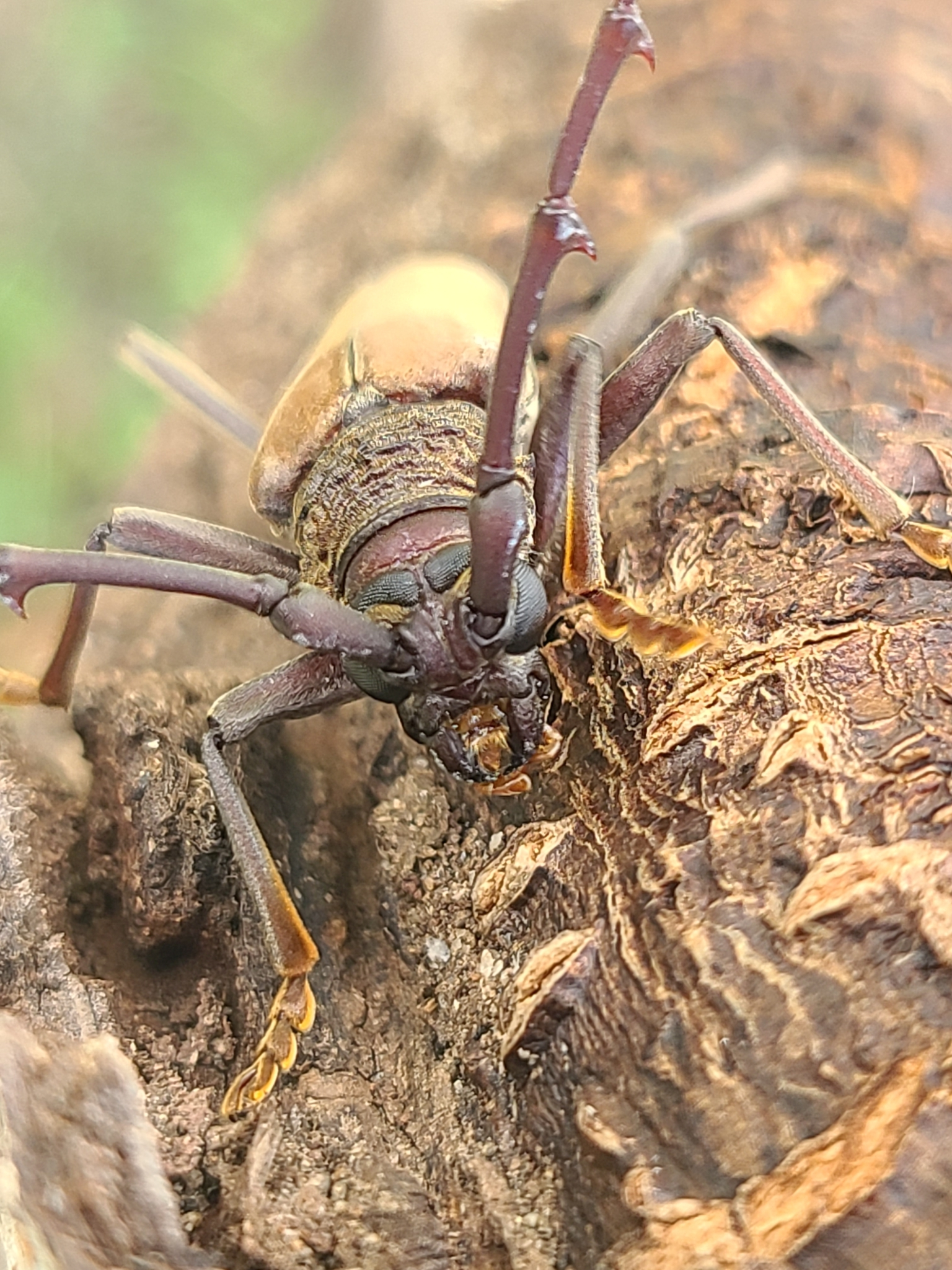
- Juiaparus mexicanus, México

Scientific classification
- Domain: Eukaryota
- Kingdom: Animalia
- Phylum: Arthropoda
- Class: Insecta
- Order: Coleoptera
- Suborder: Polyphaga
- Infraorder: Cucujiformia
- Family: Cerambycidae
- Subfamily: Cerambycinae
- Tribe: Cerambycini
- Genus: Juiaparus; Martins & Monné, 2002

= Juiaparus =

Genus of beetles

Juiaparus is a genus of Long-Horned Beetles in the beetle family Cerambycidae. There are about five described species in Juiaparus.

== Species ==
These five species belong to the genus Juiaparus:

- Juiaparus batus (Linné, 1758) (Central and South America)
- Juiaparus erythropus (Nonfried, 1895) (Colombia)
- Juiaparus lasiocerus (Gahan, 1892) (Ecuador, Brazil, Bolivia, and French Guiana)
- Juiaparus mexicanus (Thomson, 1861)((Mexico, Central and South America)
- Juiaparus punctulatus (Gahan, 1892) (Brazil)
