= Psyrassa =

Scientific classification
- Kingdom: Animalia
- Phylum: Arthropoda
- Clade: Pancrustacea
- Class: Insecta
- Order: Coleoptera
- Suborder: Polyphaga
- Infraorder: Cucujiformia
- Family: Cerambycidae
- Subfamily: Cerambycinae
- Tribe: Elaphidiini
- Genus: Psyrassa; Pascoe, 1866

Genus of beetles

Psyrassa is a genus of beetles in the family Cerambycidae, containing the following species:

- Psyrassa aliena (Linsley, 1934)
- Psyrassa angelicae Toledo, 2005
- Psyrassa basicornis Pascoe, 1866
- Psyrassa bicolor García & Toledo-Hernández 2022 [replacement for Psyrassa linsleyi Toledo, 2002 after transfer from Megapsyrassa linsleyi]
- Psyrassa brevicornis Linsley, 1934
- Psyrassa castanea Bates, 1880
- Psyrassa cerina Toledo, 2005
- Psyrassa chamelae Toledo, 2005
- Psyrassa chemsaki Toledo, 2002
- Psyrassa clavigera Toledo, 2005
- Psyrassa cribricollis (Bates, 1885)
- Psyrassa cuprina García & Toledo-Hernández 2022 [replacement for Psyrassa testacea Giesbert, 1993 after transfer from Megapsyrassa testacea, justified emendation in García & Toledo-Hernández 2023]
- Psyrassa cylindricollis Linsley, 1935
- Psyrassa ebenina Linsley, 1935
- Psyrassa graciliatra Toledo, 2005
- Psyrassa jaumei (Fisher, 1935)
- Psyrassa katsurae Chemsak & Noguera, 1993
- Psyrassa levicollis Chemsak & Noguera, 1993
- Psyrassa linsleyi (Chemsak & Giesbert, 1986)].
- Psyrassa maesi Audureau, 2010
- Psyrassa megalops Chemsak & Noguera, 1993
- Psyrassa meridionalis Martins, 2005
- Psyrassa nigricornis Bates, 1892
- Psyrassa nigripes Linsley, 1935
- Psyrassa nigroaenea Bates, 1892
- Psyrassa oaxacae Toledo, 2002
- Psyrassa pertenuis (Casey, 1924)
- Psyrassa proxima Toledo, 2005
- Psyrassa punctulata Bates, 1892
- Psyrassa rufescens Nonfried, 1894
- Psyrassa rufofemorata Linsley, 1935
- Psyrassa sallaei Bates, 1885
- Psyrassa sinaloae Linsley, 1935
- Psyrassa sthenias Bates, 1892
- Psyrassa subglabra Linsley, 1935
- Psyrassa subpicea (White, 1853)
- Psyrassa testacea Linsley, 1935
- Psyrassa tympanophora Bates, 1885
- Psyrassa unicolor (Randall, 1838)
- Psyrassa wappesi Chemsak & Noguera, 1997
- Psyrassa woodleyi Lingafelter, 2008
