= Psyrassa graciliatra =

Scientific classification
- Kingdom: Animalia
- Phylum: Arthropoda
- Class: Insecta
- Order: Coleoptera
- Suborder: Polyphaga
- Infraorder: Cucujiformia
- Family: Cerambycidae
- Genus: Psyrassa
- Species: P. graciliatra

Binomial name
- Psyrassa graciliatra Toledo, 2006

Species of beetle

Psyrassa graciliatra is a species of beetle in the family Cerambycidae.
