= Juiaparus lasiocerus =

Scientific classification
- Domain: Eukaryota
- Kingdom: Animalia
- Phylum: Arthropoda
- Class: Insecta
- Order: Coleoptera
- Suborder: Polyphaga
- Infraorder: Cucujiformia
- Family: Cerambycidae
- Subfamily: Cerambycinae
- Tribe: Cerambycini
- Genus: Juiaparus
- Species: J. lasiocerus

Binomial name
- Juiaparus lasiocerus (Gahan, 1892)

Synonyms
- Brasilianus lasiocerus Zajciw, 1958; Hamaticherus lasiocerus Aurivillius, 1912; Hammatichaerus lasiocerus Gounelle, 1906; Hammaticherus lasiocerus Gahan, 1892; Hammatochaerus lasiocerus Gounelle, 1909; Juiparus lasiocerus Martins, Galileo & Limeira-de-Oliveira, 2009

Species of beetle

Juiaparus lasiocerus is a species in the longhorn beetle family Cerambycidae. It is found in Ecuador, Brazil, Bolivia, and French Guiana.
