= Criodion tuberculatum =

Scientific classification
- Domain: Eukaryota
- Kingdom: Animalia
- Phylum: Arthropoda
- Class: Insecta
- Order: Coleoptera
- Suborder: Polyphaga
- Infraorder: Cucujiformia
- Family: Cerambycidae
- Subfamily: Cerambycinae
- Tribe: Cerambycini
- Genus: Criodion
- Species: C. tuberculatum

Binomial name
- Criodion tuberculatum Gahan, 1892

Species of beetle

Criodion tuberculatum is a species in the longhorn beetle family Cerambycidae. It is found in Ecuador, French Guiana, Bolivia, Peru, and Brazil.
