= Metaleptus brasiliensis =

Scientific classification
- Domain: Eukaryota
- Kingdom: Animalia
- Phylum: Arthropoda
- Class: Insecta
- Order: Coleoptera
- Suborder: Polyphaga
- Infraorder: Cucujiformia
- Family: Cerambycidae
- Genus: Metaleptus
- Species: M. brasiliensis

Binomial name
- Metaleptus brasiliensis (Schaufuss, 1871)

Species of beetle

Metaleptus brasiliensis is a species of beetle in the family Cerambycidae. It was described by Schaufuss in 1871.
