= Megapsyrassa chiapaneca =

Scientific classification
- Kingdom: Animalia
- Phylum: Arthropoda
- Class: Insecta
- Order: Coleoptera
- Suborder: Polyphaga
- Infraorder: Cucujiformia
- Family: Cerambycidae
- Genus: Megapsyrassa
- Species: M. chiapaneca

Binomial name
- Megapsyrassa chiapaneca Giesbert, 1993

Species of beetle

Megapsyrassa chiapaneca is a species of beetle in the family Cerambycidae. It was described by Giesbert in 1993.
