= Paramorphochelus mundus =

Scientific classification
- Kingdom: Animalia
- Phylum: Arthropoda
- Class: Insecta
- Order: Coleoptera
- Suborder: Polyphaga
- Infraorder: Scarabaeiformia
- Family: Scarabaeidae
- Genus: Paramorphochelus
- Species: P. mundus

Binomial name
- Paramorphochelus mundus Lacroix, 1997

Species of beetle

Paramorphochelus mundus is a species of beetle of the family Scarabaeidae. It is found in Madagascar.

== Description ==
Adults reach a length of about 5.5–7 mm (0.22–0.28 in). They have an elongated, rather slender body. The upper surface is light brown, with short, fine but fairly dense hairs.
