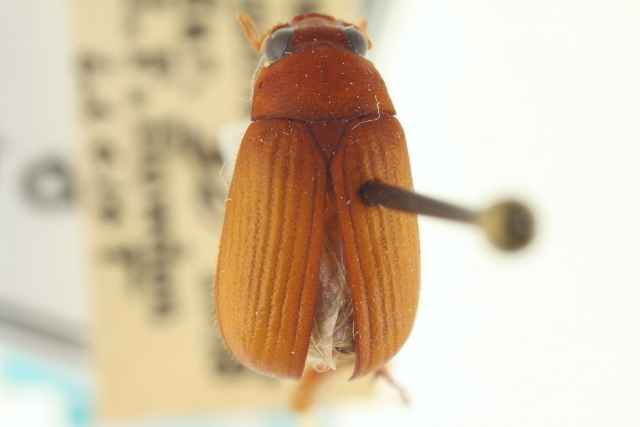

Scientific classification
- Kingdom: Animalia
- Phylum: Arthropoda
- Class: Insecta
- Order: Coleoptera
- Suborder: Polyphaga
- Infraorder: Scarabaeiformia
- Family: Scarabaeidae
- Genus: Serica
- Species: S. elongata

Binomial name
- Serica elongata Nonfried, 1891

Synonyms
- Serica uniformis Nonfried, 1892; Serica delicata Dawson, 1922

= Serica elongata =

Species of beetle

Serica elongata is a species of beetle of the family Scarabaeidae. It is found in the coastal areas of Florida. There are also isolated records from Georgia and South Carolina.

Adults reach a length of about 6.9 mm. They have a dark reddish brown, oblong body. The antennae are yellow. The dorsal surface is dull and densely setose on the head, but otherwise almost glabrous.
