= Paramorphochelus seorsus =

Scientific classification
- Kingdom: Animalia
- Phylum: Arthropoda
- Class: Insecta
- Order: Coleoptera
- Suborder: Polyphaga
- Infraorder: Scarabaeiformia
- Family: Scarabaeidae
- Genus: Paramorphochelus
- Species: P. seorsus

Binomial name
- Paramorphochelus seorsus Lacroix, 1997

Species of beetle

Paramorphochelus seorsus is a species of beetle of the family Scarabaeidae. It is found in Madagascar.

== Description ==
Adults reach a length of about 6–7.5 mm (0.24–0.30 in). They have a long, straight body. The upper surface is dark with fine, abundant hair.
