= Neoserica suturata =

Scientific classification
- Kingdom: Animalia
- Phylum: Arthropoda
- Class: Insecta
- Order: Coleoptera
- Suborder: Polyphaga
- Infraorder: Scarabaeiformia
- Family: Scarabaeidae
- Genus: Neoserica
- Species: N. suturata

Binomial name
- Neoserica suturata (Brenske, 1894)

Synonyms
- Serica suturata Brenske, 1894

Species of beetle

Neoserica suturata is a species of beetle of the family Scarabaeidae. It is found on Borneo.

== Description ==
Adults reach a length of about 7.75 mm. The forehead is smooth, with extensive punctures only laterally. The thorax is unevenly punctured, not very densely, and rather finely. the lateral margin has individual setae. The elytra are deeply striated with a pronounced, smooth suture and very deep stripes alongside it. The spaces between are sparsely ruffled.
