= Madahoplia griseosetosa =

Scientific classification
- Kingdom: Animalia
- Phylum: Arthropoda
- Class: Insecta
- Order: Coleoptera
- Suborder: Polyphaga
- Infraorder: Scarabaeiformia
- Family: Scarabaeidae
- Genus: Madahoplia
- Species: M. griseosetosa

Binomial name
- Madahoplia griseosetosa (Fairmaire, 1897)

Synonyms
- Hoplia griseosetosa Fairmaire, 1897

Species of beetle

Madahoplia griseosetosa is a species of beetle of the family Scarabaeidae. It is found in Madagascar.

== Description ==
Adults reach a length of about 4–5 mm (0.16–0.20 in). They have an oval body. The upper surface is brown with a light yellow scaly covering.
