= Neoserica rufobrunnea =

Scientific classification
- Kingdom: Animalia
- Phylum: Arthropoda
- Class: Insecta
- Order: Coleoptera
- Suborder: Polyphaga
- Infraorder: Scarabaeiformia
- Family: Scarabaeidae
- Genus: Neoserica
- Species: N. rufobrunnea

Binomial name
- Neoserica rufobrunnea (Nonfried, 1894)

Synonyms
- Serica rufobrunnea Nonfried, 1894; Serica molesta Brenske, 1894

Species of beetle

Neoserica rufobrunnea is a species of beetle of the family Scarabaeidae. It is found in Indonesia (Sumatra).

== Description ==
Adults reach a length of about 6.5 mm. The frons is widely punctate behind the indistinct suture, further posteriorly, smooth and glossy like the vertex. The thorax is not very densely punctate, the punctures only slightly more pronounced than on the head. The center of the scutellum is broadly smooth. The elytra are punctate. The punctures form streaks, but not uniformly so. The spaces between them are raised, the sides densely covered with short setae.
