= Stesilea =

Scientific classification
- Domain: Eukaryota
- Kingdom: Animalia
- Phylum: Arthropoda
- Class: Insecta
- Order: Coleoptera
- Suborder: Polyphaga
- Infraorder: Cucujiformia
- Family: Cerambycidae
- Tribe: Pteropliini
- Genus: Stesilea

Genus of beetles

Stesilea is a genus of longhorn beetles of the subfamily Lamiinae, containing the following species:

- Stesilea borneotica Breuning & de Jong, 1941
- Stesilea celebensis Breuning, 1962
- Stesilea gracilis Breuning, 1938
- Stesilea inornata Pascoe, 1865
- Stesilea laevifrons Breunig, 1943
- Stesilea prolata Pascoe, 1865
- Stesilea truncata Breuning, 1962

incertae sedis

- Stesilea tuberculata Nonfried, 1894
