= Anton Franz Nonfried =

Anton Franz Nonfried, also known as Antonín František Nonfried, (16 October 1854, Rakovník – 16 December 1923, Rakovník) was a German Bohemian amateur entomologist and insect collector.

== Published works ==
- Nonfried, A. F. "Beitrag zu einer Monographie der Gattung Plusiotis Burni" (PDF) (in German). Oberösterreichische Landesmuseum.
- Nonfried, A. (1893). "Beiträge zur Käferfauna von Manipur (Vorderindien)". Berliner Entomologische Zeitschrift (in German). 38 (3–4): 327–340. doi:10.1002/mmnd.18940380308 – via BioStor.
- Nonfried, A. Fr. (1894). "Monographische Beiträge zur Käferfauna von Central-Amerika". Berliner Entomologische Zeitschrift (in German). 38 (3–4): 279–296. doi:10.1002/mmnd.18940380304.
