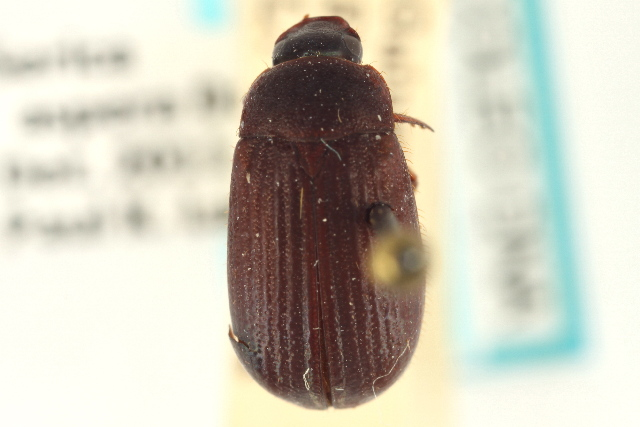

Scientific classification
- Kingdom: Animalia
- Phylum: Arthropoda
- Class: Insecta
- Order: Coleoptera
- Suborder: Polyphaga
- Infraorder: Scarabaeiformia
- Family: Scarabaeidae
- Genus: Serica
- Species: S. aspera

Binomial name
- Serica aspera Dawson, 1922

= Serica aspera =

Species of beetle

Serica aspera is a species of scarab beetles in the family Scarabaeidae. It is found in North America (Alabama, Florida, Georgia, North Carolina, South Carolina, Texas).

== Description ==
Adults are similar to Serica parallela, but are slightly smaller and the antennal clubs are distinctly longer.
