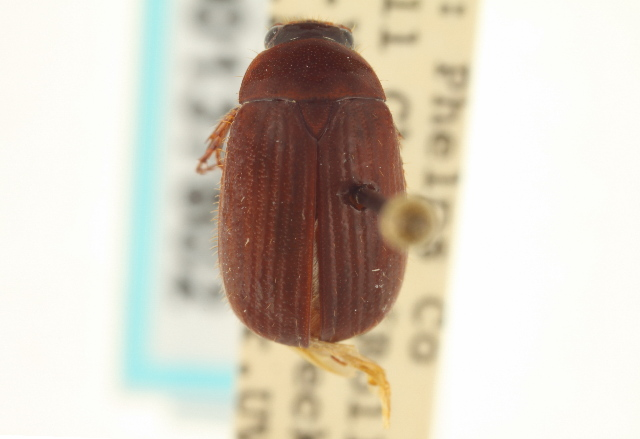

Scientific classification
- Kingdom: Animalia
- Phylum: Arthropoda
- Class: Insecta
- Order: Coleoptera
- Suborder: Polyphaga
- Infraorder: Scarabaeiformia
- Family: Scarabaeidae
- Genus: Serica
- Species: S. mystaca

Binomial name
- Serica mystaca Dawson, 1922

= Serica mystaca =

Species of beetle

Serica mystaca is a species of scarab beetle in the family Scarabaeidae. It is found in the United States (Alabama, Arizona, Connecticut, Illinois, Indiana, Iowa, Louisiana, Maryland, Massachusetts, Mississippi, Nebraska, New Jersey, New York, North Carolina, Pennsylvania, Rhode Island, South Carolina, Texas, Wisconsin).

== Description ==
Adults closely resemble Serica parallela, but are slightly larger, more robust, darker in colour and often more distinctly iridescent.
