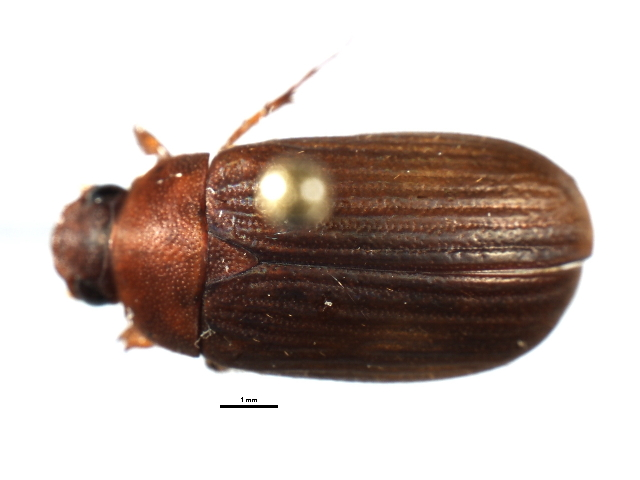

Scientific classification
- Kingdom: Animalia
- Phylum: Arthropoda
- Class: Insecta
- Order: Coleoptera
- Suborder: Polyphaga
- Infraorder: Scarabaeiformia
- Family: Scarabaeidae
- Genus: Serica
- Species: S. parallela

Binomial name
- Serica parallela Casey, 1884

= Serica parallela =

Species of beetle

Serica parallela is a species of scarab beetle in the family Scarabaeidae. It is found in North America (Georgia, Illinois, Indiana, Maryland, Massachusetts, Michigan, Minnesota, New Hampshire, New Jersey, New York, North Carolina, Pennsylvania, Texas, Virginia, Wisconsin, Ontario, Quebec).

== Description ==
Adults reach a length of about 7.5-8.5 mm. The colour varies from mahogany red, to bay or chestnut. The surface is velvety and opaque, with a slight iridescence.
