= Serica oliver =

Scientific classification
- Kingdom: Animalia
- Phylum: Arthropoda
- Class: Insecta
- Order: Coleoptera
- Suborder: Polyphaga
- Infraorder: Scarabaeiformia
- Family: Scarabaeidae
- Genus: Serica
- Species: S. oliver

Binomial name
- Serica oliver Saylor, 1939

Synonyms
- Serica joaquinella Saylor, 1939; Serica oliveri

Species of beetle

Serica oliver is a species of beetle of the family Scarabaeidae. It is found in the United States (California).

== Description ==
Adults have a dark colour, robust stature and strongly pruinose elytra. They resemble Serica pullata.
