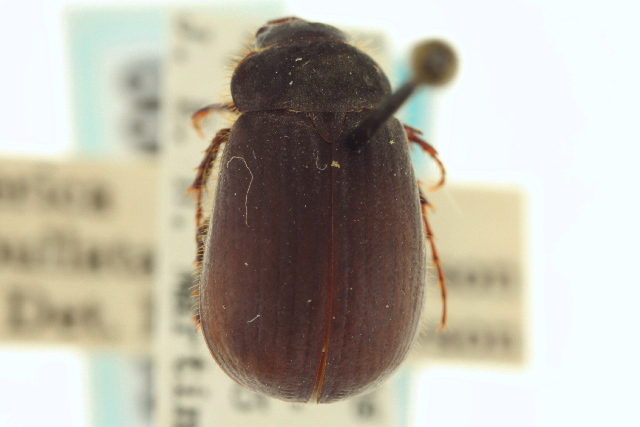

Scientific classification
- Kingdom: Animalia
- Phylum: Arthropoda
- Class: Insecta
- Order: Coleoptera
- Suborder: Polyphaga
- Infraorder: Scarabaeiformia
- Family: Scarabaeidae
- Genus: Serica
- Species: S. pullata

Binomial name
- Serica pullata Dawson, 1967

= Serica pullata =

Species of beetle

Serica pullata is a species of beetle of the family Scarabaeidae. It is found in the United States (California).

== Description ==
Adults reach a length of about 8 mm. The colour is piceous black, dulled by a grey bloom. They are bare above, and sparsely clothed with short, ferruginuous hair beneath, becoming longer and conspicuous on the front and middle legs.
