= Serica anmashana =

Scientific classification
- Kingdom: Animalia
- Phylum: Arthropoda
- Class: Insecta
- Order: Coleoptera
- Suborder: Polyphaga
- Infraorder: Scarabaeiformia
- Family: Scarabaeidae
- Genus: Serica
- Species: S. anmashana

Binomial name
- Serica anmashana (Kobayashi, 1993)

Synonyms
- Taiwanoserica anmashana Kobayashi, 1993

Species of beetle

Serica anmashana is a species of beetle of the family Scarabaeidae. It is found in Taiwan.

== Description ==
Adults reach a length of about 10 mm. They are very similar to Serica yui, but the antennal club has the same length as the footstalk in males and is shorter than in females, the pronotum is broadest at the basal two-thirds, with the lateral margins gently rounded, the anterior angles produced and subrectangular.
