= Serica yui =

Scientific classification
- Kingdom: Animalia
- Phylum: Arthropoda
- Class: Insecta
- Order: Coleoptera
- Suborder: Polyphaga
- Infraorder: Scarabaeiformia
- Family: Scarabaeidae
- Genus: Serica
- Species: S. yui

Binomial name
- Serica yui (Kobayashi, 1993)

Synonyms
- Taiwanoserica yui Kobayashi, 1993

Species of beetle

Serica yui is a species of beetle of the family Scarabaeidae. It is found in Taiwan.

== Description ==
Adults reach a length of about 10 mm. They have a light reddish brown or reddish brown, elongate oval body, with the clypeus, tibiae and tarsi reddish brown, the posterior part of the head blackish brown to dark reddish brown and the antennae yellowish-brown. The dorsal surface is mottled with blackish patches. The surface of the body is opaque, with the clypeus, antennae and legs shining.
