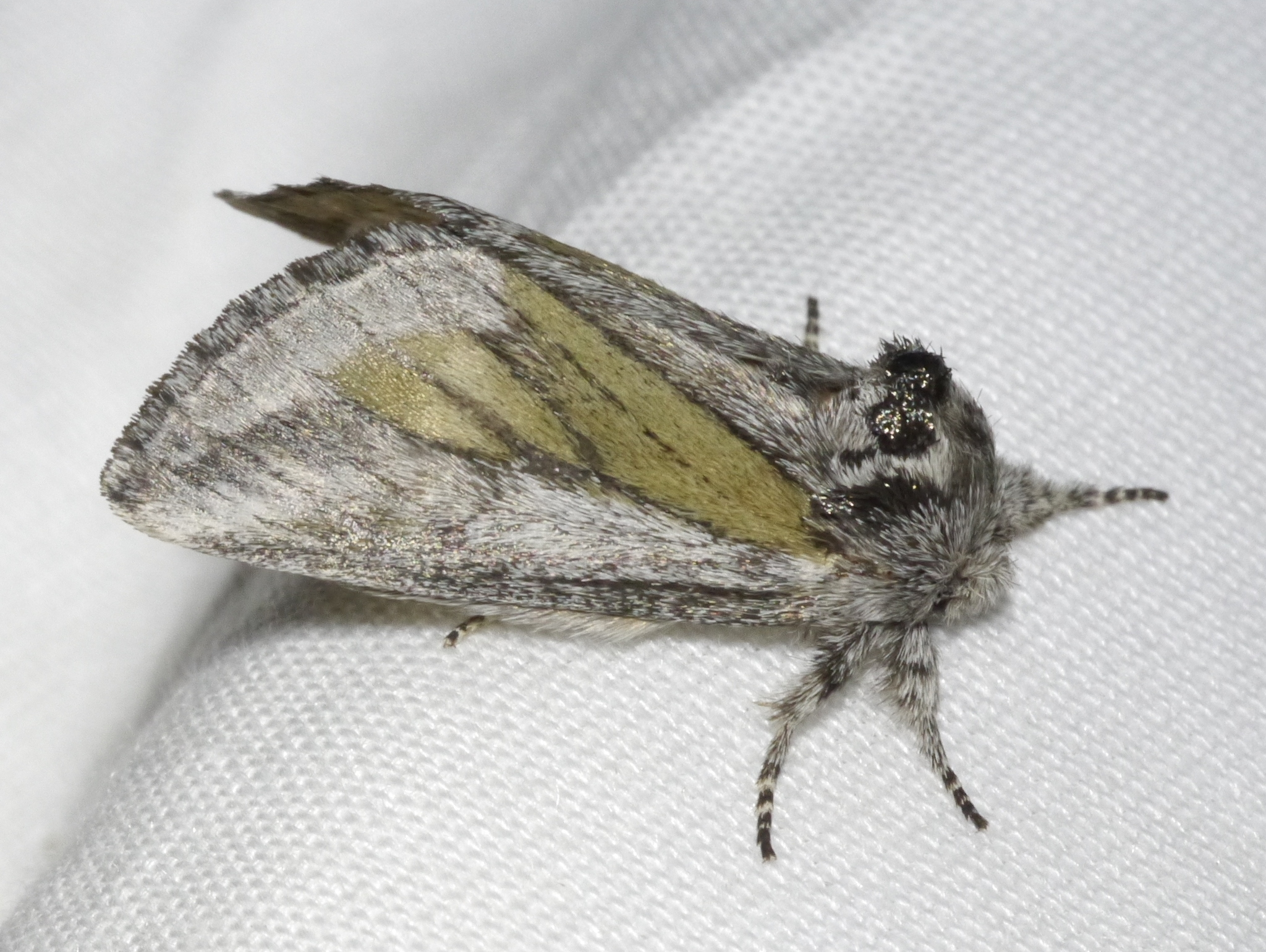
- Astiptodonta wymola, Arizona

Scientific classification
- Kingdom: Animalia
- Phylum: Arthropoda
- Clade: Pancrustacea
- Class: Insecta
- Order: Lepidoptera
- Superfamily: Noctuoidea
- Family: Notodontidae
- Subfamily: Heterocampinae
- Genus: Astiptodonta
- Species: A. wymola

Binomial name
- Astiptodonta wymola (Barnes, 1905)

Synonyms
- Litodonta wymola (Barnes, 1905)

= Astiptodonta wymola =

Species of moth

Astiptodonta wymola is a species of prominent moth in the family Notodontidae. It was first described by William Barnes in 1905 and it is found in North America.

The MONA or Hodges number for Astiptodonta wymola is 7970.

This species was formerly a member of the genus Litodonta, but was transferred to a new genus, Astiptodonta, as a result of research published in 2021.
