= Astiptodonta aonides =

Scientific classification
- Kingdom: Animalia
- Phylum: Arthropoda
- Clade: Pancrustacea
- Class: Insecta
- Order: Lepidoptera
- Superfamily: Noctuoidea
- Family: Notodontidae
- Subfamily: Heterocampinae
- Genus: Astiptodonta
- Species: A. aonides

Binomial name
- Astiptodonta aonides (Strecker, 1899)

Synonyms
- Litodonta aonides

Species of moth

Astiptodonta aonides is a species of prominent moth in the family Notodontidae. It was first described by Strecker in 1899 and is found in North America.

The MONA or Hodges number for Astiptodonta aonides is 7971.

This species was formerly a member of the genus Litodonta, but was transferred to a new genus, Astiptodonta, as a result of research published in 2021.
