= Manteo =

Manteo may refer to:

- Manteo, 1st Baron of Roanoke and Dasamongueponke, sixteenth-century American Indian leader involved with the Roanoke Colony
- Manteo, North Carolina, United States
- Manteo, Virginia, United States
- Manteo High School, North Carolina
- Lochmaeus manteo, a North American moth
- Manteo Elementary School, North Carolina
- Manteo to Murphy, an expression that means "across North Carolina"
- Navy Auxiliary Air Station Manteo, now Dare County Regional Airport, North Carolina
