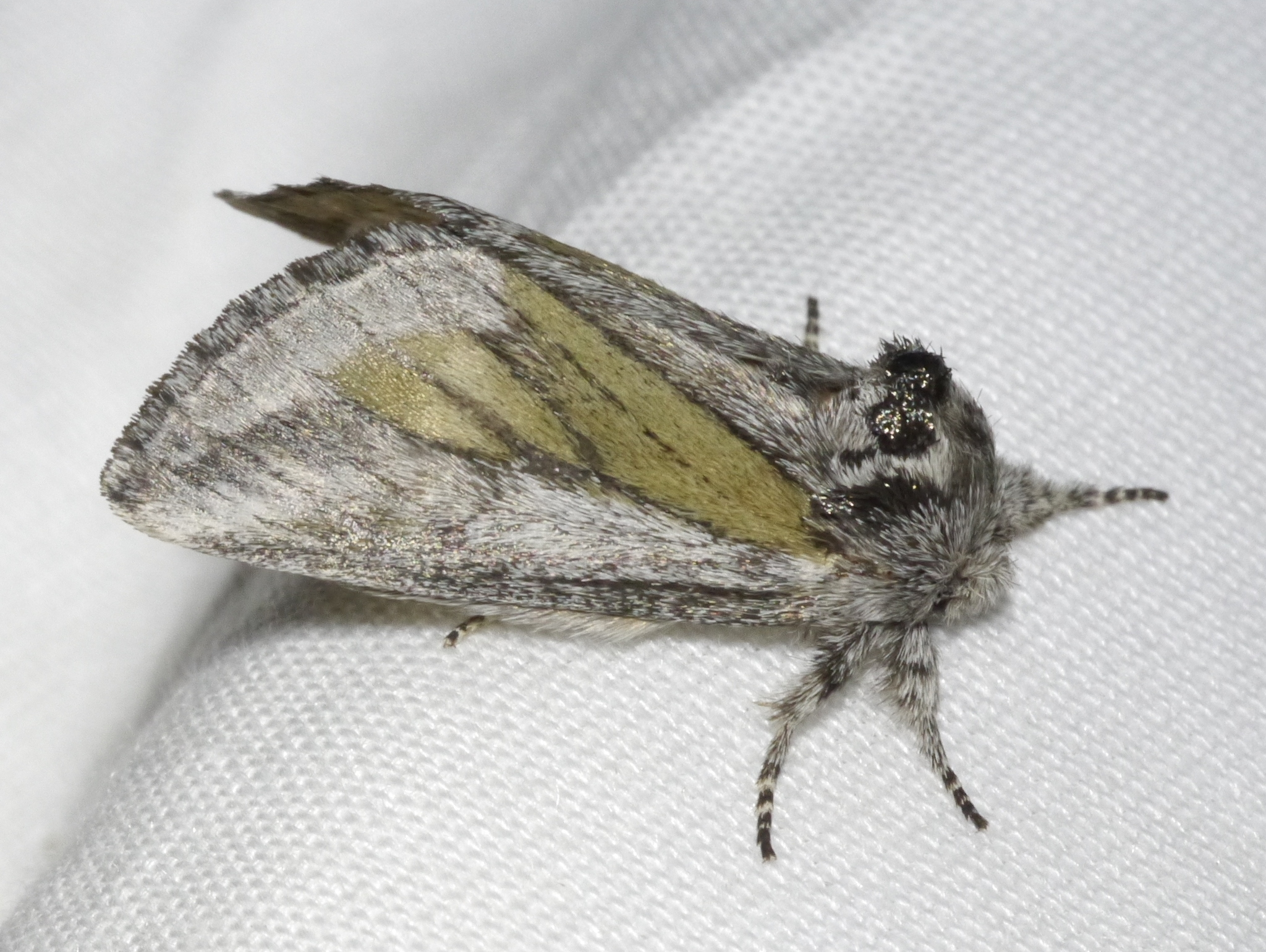
- Astiptodonta wymola, Arizona

Scientific classification
- Kingdom: Animalia
- Phylum: Arthropoda
- Clade: Pancrustacea
- Class: Insecta
- Order: Lepidoptera
- Superfamily: Noctuoidea
- Family: Notodontidae
- Subfamily: Heterocampinae
- Genus: Astiptodonta; Miller & Wagner, 2021

= Astiptodonta =

Genus of prominent moths

Astiptodonta is a genus of prominent moths in the family Notodontidae. There are at least two described species in Astiptodonta, found in the southwestern United States and Mexico.

== Species ==
These two species belong to the genus Astiptodonta:

- Astiptodonta aonides (Strecker, 1899)
- Astiptodonta wymola (Barnes, 1905)
