= Macrurocampa gigantea =

Scientific classification
- Kingdom: Animalia
- Phylum: Arthropoda
- Clade: Pancrustacea
- Class: Insecta
- Order: Lepidoptera
- Superfamily: Noctuoidea
- Family: Notodontidae
- Subfamily: Heterocampinae
- Genus: Macrurocampa
- Species: M. gigantea

Binomial name
- Macrurocampa gigantea (Barnes & Benjamin, 1924)

Synonyms
- Litodonta gigantea

Species of moth

Macrurocampa gigantea is a species of moth in the family Notodontidae (the prominents). It was first described by William Barnes and Foster Hendrickson Benjamin in and it is found in North America.

The MONA or Hodges number for Macrurocampa gigantea is 7972.

This species was formerly a member of the genus Litodonta, but was transferred to Macrurocampa as a result of research published in 2021.
