= Viriviri =

Viriviri may refer to:

== People ==
- Samisoni Viriviri (born 1988), Fiji rugby union player
- Samisoni Viriviri (rugby union coach) (1953–2021), Fijian rugby union player

== Other uses ==
- Somera viriviri, moth species
