= Azaxia =

Scientific classification
- Kingdom: Animalia
- Phylum: Arthropoda
- Clade: Pancrustacea
- Class: Insecta
- Order: Lepidoptera
- Superfamily: Noctuoidea
- Family: Notodontidae
- Subfamily: Heterocampinae
- Genus: Azaxia; Dyar, 1908

Genus of moths

Azaxia is a genus of moths of the family Notodontidae.

== Species ==
- Azaxia dyari Schaus, 1911
- Azaxia hamula Miller, 2011
- Azaxia luteilinea (Druce, 1904)
