= Meragisa =

Scientific classification
- Kingdom: Animalia
- Phylum: Arthropoda
- Clade: Pancrustacea
- Class: Insecta
- Order: Lepidoptera
- Superfamily: Noctuoidea
- Family: Notodontidae
- Subfamily: Heterocampinae
- Genus: Meragisa; Schaus, 1901

Genus of moths

Meragisa is a genus of moths of the family Notodontidae. The genus contains about 45 species, distributed from Mexico south to Bolivia and Brazil.

== Selected species ==
- Meragisa dasra Dognin, 1904
- Meragisa nicolasi Schaus, 1939
- Meragisa valdiviesoi (Dognin, 1890)
- Meragisa zebrina Miller, 2011
