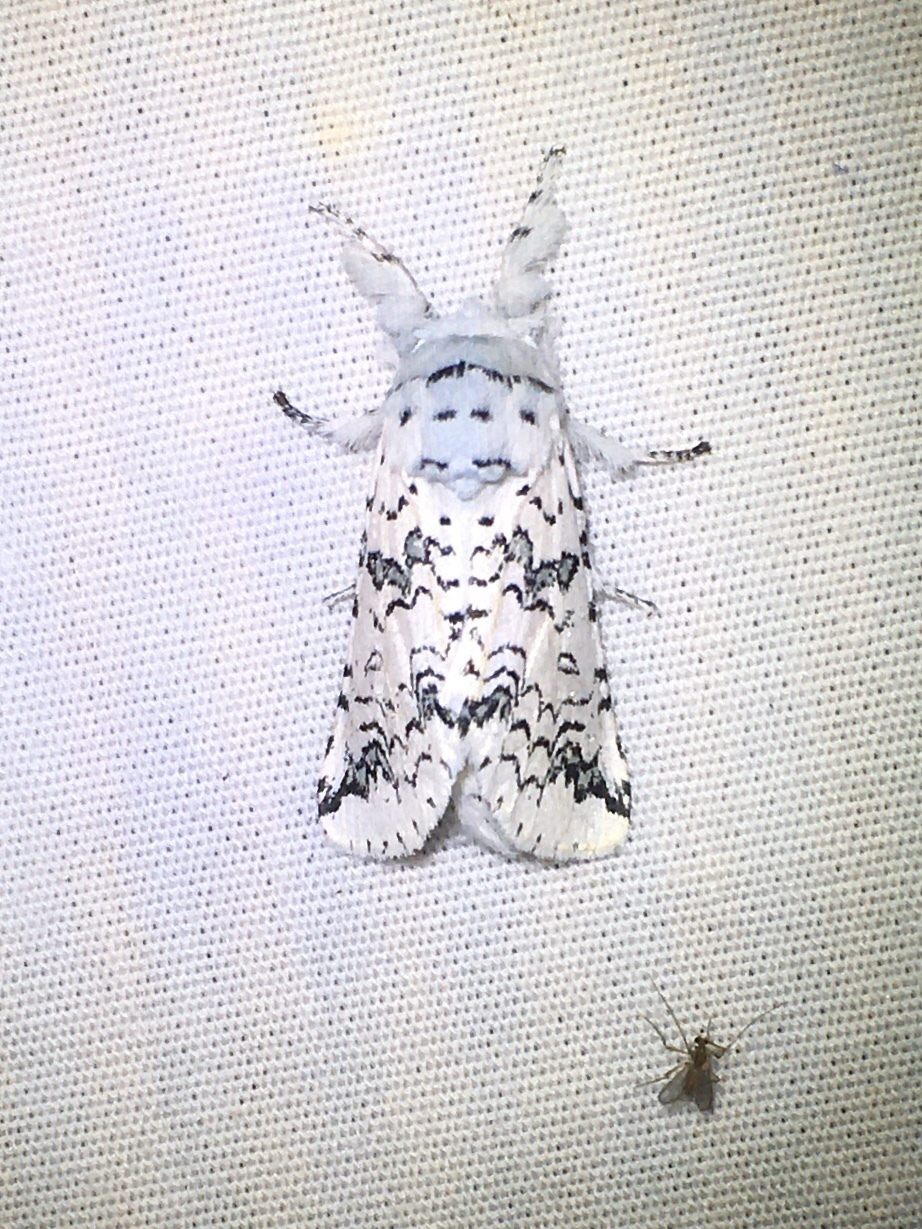
- Americerura scitiscripta

Scientific classification
- Domain: Eukaryota
- Kingdom: Animalia
- Phylum: Arthropoda
- Class: Insecta
- Order: Lepidoptera
- Superfamily: Noctuoidea
- Family: Notodontidae
- Subfamily: Cerurinae
- Genus: Americerura; St Laurent & Goldstein, 2023

= Americerura =

Genus of moths

Americerura is a genus of prominent moths in the family Notodontidae. There are about 17 described species in Americerura. As a result of research published in 2023, these species were transferred from the genus Tecmessa, creating the genus Americerura.

== Species ==
These 17 species belong to Americerura:

- Americerura annulifera (Berg, 1878)
- Americerura argynnis (Schaus, 1901)
- Americerura bratteata (Draudt, 1932)
- Americerura candida (Lintner, 1878)
- Americerura dandon (Druce, 1894)
- Americerura duonumenia (Dyar, 1912)
- Americerura grandis (Schaus, 1901)
- Americerura lancea (Schaus, 1905)
- Americerura presidio (Dyar 1922)
- Americerura purusa (Schaus, 1928)
- Americerura rarata (Walker, 1865)
- Americerura rivera (Schaus, 1901)
- Americerura scitiscripta (Walker, 1865) (black-etched prominent)
- Americerura splendens (Jones, 1908)
- Americerura tehuacana (Draudt, 1932)
- Americerura trigonostigma (Dyar, 1925)
- Americerura xicona (Dyar, 1924)
