= Drugera =

Scientific classification
- Kingdom: Animalia
- Phylum: Arthropoda
- Clade: Pancrustacea
- Class: Insecta
- Order: Lepidoptera
- Superfamily: Noctuoidea
- Family: Notodontidae
- Subfamily: Heterocampinae
- Genus: Drugera; Schaus, 1901

Genus of moths

Drugera is a genus of moths of the family Notodontidae.

== Selected species ==
- Drugera morona (Druce, 1898)
- Drugera santiago Thiaucourt & Miller, 2011
