= Disphragis manethusa =

Scientific classification
- Kingdom: Animalia
- Phylum: Arthropoda
- Clade: Pancrustacea
- Class: Insecta
- Order: Lepidoptera
- Superfamily: Noctuoidea
- Family: Notodontidae
- Genus: Disphragis
- Species: D. manethusa

Binomial name
- Disphragis manethusa (H. Druce, 1887)

Synonyms
- Heterocampa manethusa H. Druce, 1887

Species of moth

Disphragis manethusa is a moth of the family Notodontidae first described by Herbert Druce in 1887. It is found in Central America.
