= Azaxia hamula =

Scientific classification
- Kingdom: Animalia
- Phylum: Arthropoda
- Clade: Pancrustacea
- Class: Insecta
- Order: Lepidoptera
- Superfamily: Noctuoidea
- Family: Notodontidae
- Genus: Azaxia
- Species: A. hamula

Binomial name
- Azaxia hamula Miller, 2011

Species of moth

Azaxia hamula is a moth of the family Notodontidae. It is found in Colombia and north-eastern Ecuador.

The length of the forewings is 22–23 mm.
