= Drugera morona =

Scientific classification
- Kingdom: Animalia
- Phylum: Arthropoda
- Clade: Pancrustacea
- Class: Insecta
- Order: Lepidoptera
- Superfamily: Noctuoidea
- Family: Notodontidae
- Genus: Drugera
- Species: D. morona

Binomial name
- Drugera morona (H. Druce, 1898)

Synonyms
- Edema morona H. Druce, 1898

Species of moth

Drugera morona is a moth of the family Notodontidae first described by Herbert Druce in 1898. It is found in Central America.

The larvae been reared in on various Miconia species.
