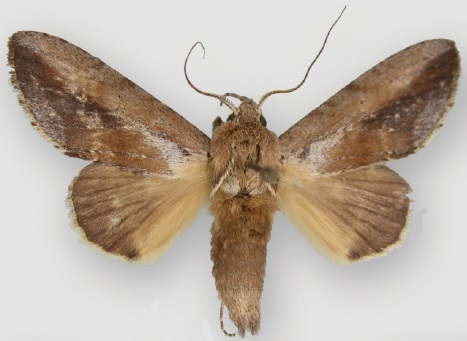
- Male

Scientific classification
- Kingdom: Animalia
- Phylum: Arthropoda
- Clade: Pancrustacea
- Class: Insecta
- Order: Lepidoptera
- Superfamily: Noctuoidea
- Family: Notodontidae
- Genus: Disphragis
- Species: D. bifurcata

Binomial name
- Disphragis bifurcata Sullivan & Pogue, 2014

= Disphragis bifurcata =

Species of moth

Disphragis bifurcata is a moth in the family Notodontidae first described by J. Bolling Sullivan and Michael G. Pogue in 2014. It is found from Guatemala to Colombia (Anchicaya, Valle and the Magdalena Valley), probably extending south into northern Ecuador. It is found at lower altitudes and moderate elevations up to about 1,000 meters.

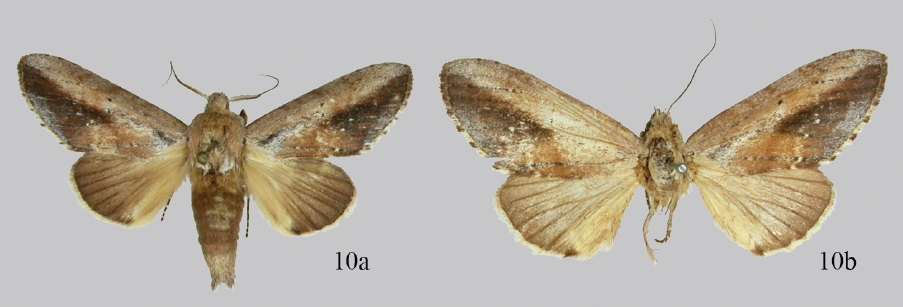
Male and female

The length of the forewings is 17.5 mm for males and 21.3 mm for females. The forewings have a broad tan subcostal streak from the base of the wing to the apex. The streak encloses a chocolate reniform spot and has several slightly darker brown lines crossing obliquely from the costa. The basal dash below the streak runs parallel to the costa. There is a white streak below the basal dash and a warm brown patch distal to the white streak, bordered by white. The hindwings are fuscous with a darker margin and veins and weak darker brown anal markings almost forming a spot at the anal angle.

== Etymology ==
The specific name bifurcata refers to the bifurcate tip of the socii, which is diagnostic.
