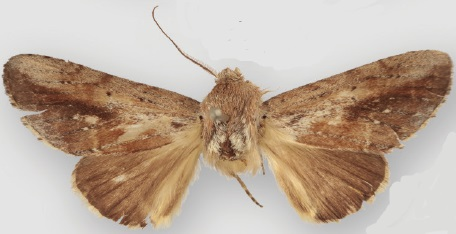
- Male
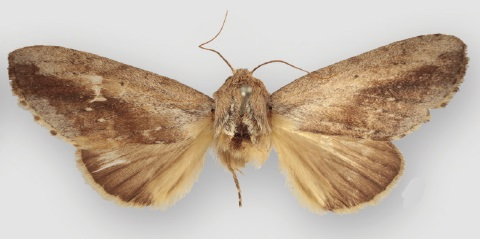
- Female

Scientific classification
- Kingdom: Animalia
- Phylum: Arthropoda
- Clade: Pancrustacea
- Class: Insecta
- Order: Lepidoptera
- Superfamily: Noctuoidea
- Family: Notodontidae
- Genus: Disphragis
- Species: D. notabilis

Binomial name
- Disphragis notabilis (Schaus, 1906)

Synonyms
- Heterocampa notabilis Schaus, 1906; Heterocampa normula Dognin, 1909

= Disphragis notabilis =

Species of moth

Disphragis notabilis is a moth of the family Notodontidae first described by William Schaus in 1906. It is found throughout the Amazon basin from western Venezuela east- and southward to at least Bolivia. The range includes French Guiana.

The length of the forewings is 17 mm for males and 20.9 mm. There is a broad tan subcostal streak from the base of the wing to the apex. This streak encloses a chocolate reniform spot and has several slightly darker brown lines crossing obliquely from the costa. There is a basal dash below the streak, perpendicular to the thorax, as well as a white streak below the dash. There is a warm brown patch distal to the white streak, bordered by white. The hindwings are fuscous with a darker margin and weak darker brown anal markings almost forming a spot.
