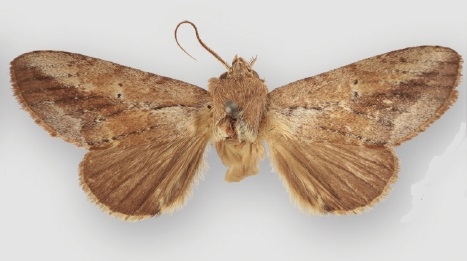
- Male

Scientific classification
- Kingdom: Animalia
- Phylum: Arthropoda
- Clade: Pancrustacea
- Class: Insecta
- Order: Lepidoptera
- Superfamily: Noctuoidea
- Family: Notodontidae
- Genus: Disphragis
- Species: D. hemicera

Binomial name
- Disphragis hemicera (Schaus, 1910)

Synonyms
- Heterocampa hemicera Schaus, 1910

= Disphragis hemicera =

Species of moth

Disphragis hemicera is a moth in the family Notodontidae first described by William Schaus in 1910. It is found throughout Costa Rica at moderate altitudes. It is found south along the western coast of Colombia and may extend to the west coast of Ecuador. The northern limits are unknown but it probably occurs at least into Nicaragua.

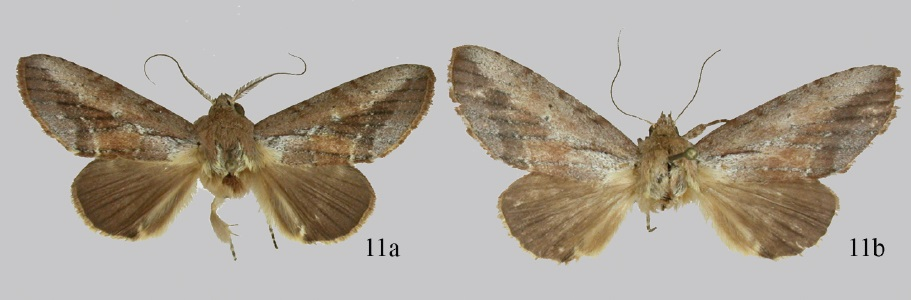
Male and female

The length of the forewings is 17.9 mm for males and 21 mm for females. The forewings have a broad light brown subcostal streak from the base of the wing to the apex. This streak encloses a chocolate reniform spot and has several slightly darker brown lines crossing obliquely from the costa. The basal dash below the streak is perpendicular to the thorax. There is a white streak below the dash, as well as a warm brown patch distal to the white streak bordered by white. The hindwings are uniformly fuscous with brown anal markings forming something of a spot at the anal margin.
