= Disphragis tricolor =

Scientific classification
- Kingdom: Animalia
- Phylum: Arthropoda
- Clade: Pancrustacea
- Class: Insecta
- Order: Lepidoptera
- Superfamily: Noctuoidea
- Family: Notodontidae
- Genus: Disphragis
- Species: D. tricolor

Binomial name
- Disphragis tricolor H. Druce, 1911

Species of moth

Disphragis tricolor is a moth of the family Notodontidae first described by Herbert Druce in 1911. It is found in the western Andes of Colombia and Ecuador.
