= Disphragis vivida =

Scientific classification
- Kingdom: Animalia
- Phylum: Arthropoda
- Clade: Pancrustacea
- Class: Insecta
- Order: Lepidoptera
- Superfamily: Noctuoidea
- Family: Notodontidae
- Genus: Disphragis
- Species: D. vivida

Binomial name
- Disphragis vivida (Schaus, 1910)

Synonyms
- Cecrita vivida (Schaus, 1910)

Species of moth

Disphragis vivida is a moth of the family Notodontidae. It is found in Costa Rica.
