= Theroa zethus =

Scientific classification
- Kingdom: Animalia
- Phylum: Arthropoda
- Clade: Pancrustacea
- Class: Insecta
- Order: Lepidoptera
- Superfamily: Noctuoidea
- Family: Notodontidae
- Genus: Theroa
- Species: T. zethus

Binomial name
- Theroa zethus (Druce, 1898)

Species of moth

Theroa zethus is a species of moth in the family Notodontidae (the prominents). It was first described by Druce in 1898 and it is found in North America.

The MONA or Hodges number for Theroa zethus is 8000.
