= Euhyparpax =

Scientific classification
- Kingdom: Animalia
- Phylum: Arthropoda
- Clade: Pancrustacea
- Class: Insecta
- Order: Lepidoptera
- Superfamily: Noctuoidea
- Family: Notodontidae
- Subfamily: Heterocampinae
- Genus: Euhyparpax; Beutenmüller, 1893

Genus of moths

Euhyparpax is a genus of moths of the family Notodontidae, the prominents. The genus was erected by Edna Libby Beutenmüller in 1893.

There are two species:

- Euhyparpax amatame (Dyar, 1916)
- Euhyparpax rosea Beutenmüller, 1893
