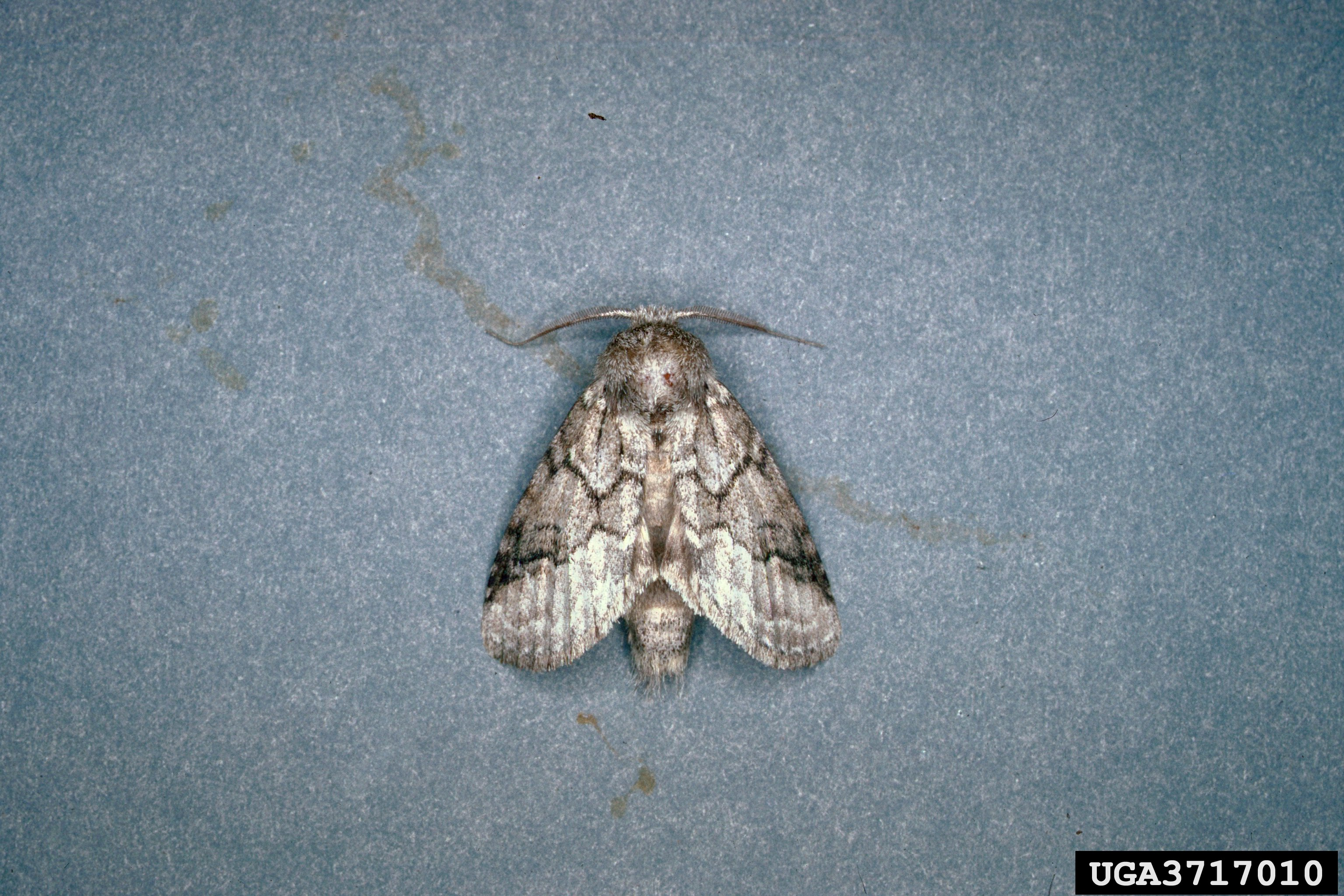
- Lochmaeus bilineata

Scientific classification
- Kingdom: Animalia
- Phylum: Arthropoda
- Clade: Pancrustacea
- Class: Insecta
- Order: Lepidoptera
- Superfamily: Noctuoidea
- Family: Notodontidae
- Subfamily: Heterocampinae
- Genus: Lochmaeus; Doubleday, 1841

= Lochmaeus =

Genus of moths

Lochmaeus is a genus of moths of the family Notodontidae first described by Edward Doubleday in 1841.

== Species ==
- Lochmaeus manteo Doubleday, 1841
- Lochmaeus bilineata (Packard, 1864)
