= Disphragis sobolis =

Scientific classification
- Kingdom: Animalia
- Phylum: Arthropoda
- Clade: Pancrustacea
- Class: Insecta
- Order: Lepidoptera
- Superfamily: Noctuoidea
- Family: Notodontidae
- Genus: Disphragis
- Species: D. sobolis

Binomial name
- Disphragis sobolis Miller, 2011

Species of moth

Disphragis sobolis is a moth of the family Notodontidae first described by James S. Miller in 2011. It is found on the eastern slopes of the Andes from Bolivia to Villavicencio in Colombia. The range includes north-eastern Ecuador.

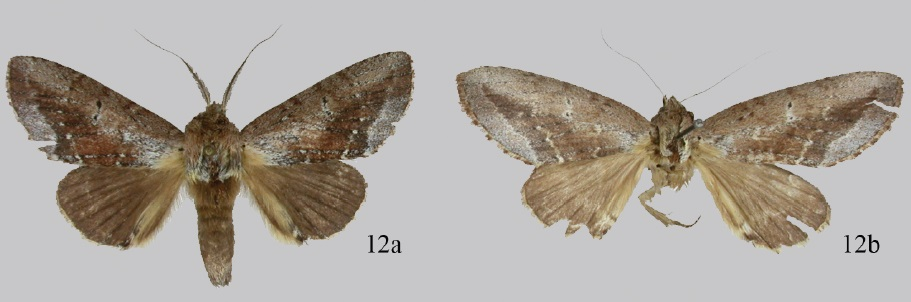
Male and female

The length of the forewings is 18.5–23 mm.
