= Afilia =

Scientific classification
- Kingdom: Animalia
- Phylum: Arthropoda
- Clade: Pancrustacea
- Class: Insecta
- Order: Lepidoptera
- Superfamily: Noctuoidea
- Family: Notodontidae
- Subfamily: Heterocampinae
- Genus: Afilia; Schaus, 1901

Genus of moths

Afilia is a genus of moths of the family Notodontidae described by William Schaus in 1901 .

== Species ==
- Afilia oslari Dyar, 1904
- Afilia cinerea Schaus, 1901
- Afilia purulha (Schaus, 1921)
