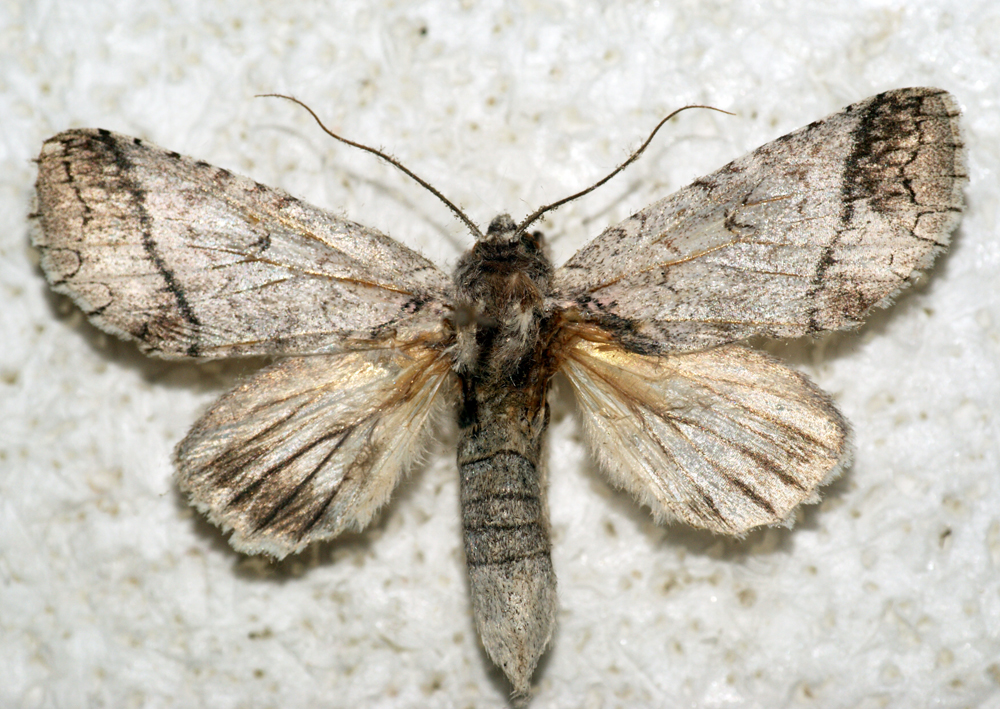
- Rifargia lineata

Scientific classification
- Kingdom: Animalia
- Phylum: Arthropoda
- Clade: Pancrustacea
- Class: Insecta
- Order: Lepidoptera
- Superfamily: Noctuoidea
- Family: Notodontidae
- Subfamily: Heterocampinae
- Genus: Rifargia; Walker, 1862

= Rifargia =

Genus of moths

Rifargia is a genus of moths of the family Notodontidae erected by Francis Walker in 1862.

== Species ==
- Rifargia bichorda (Hampson, 1901)
- Rifargia distinguenda (Walker, 1856)
- Rifargia ditta (Barnes & McDunnough, 1910)
- Rifargia lineata (Druce, 1887)
- Rifargia xylinoides Walker, 1862
- Rifargia occulta Schaus, 1905
