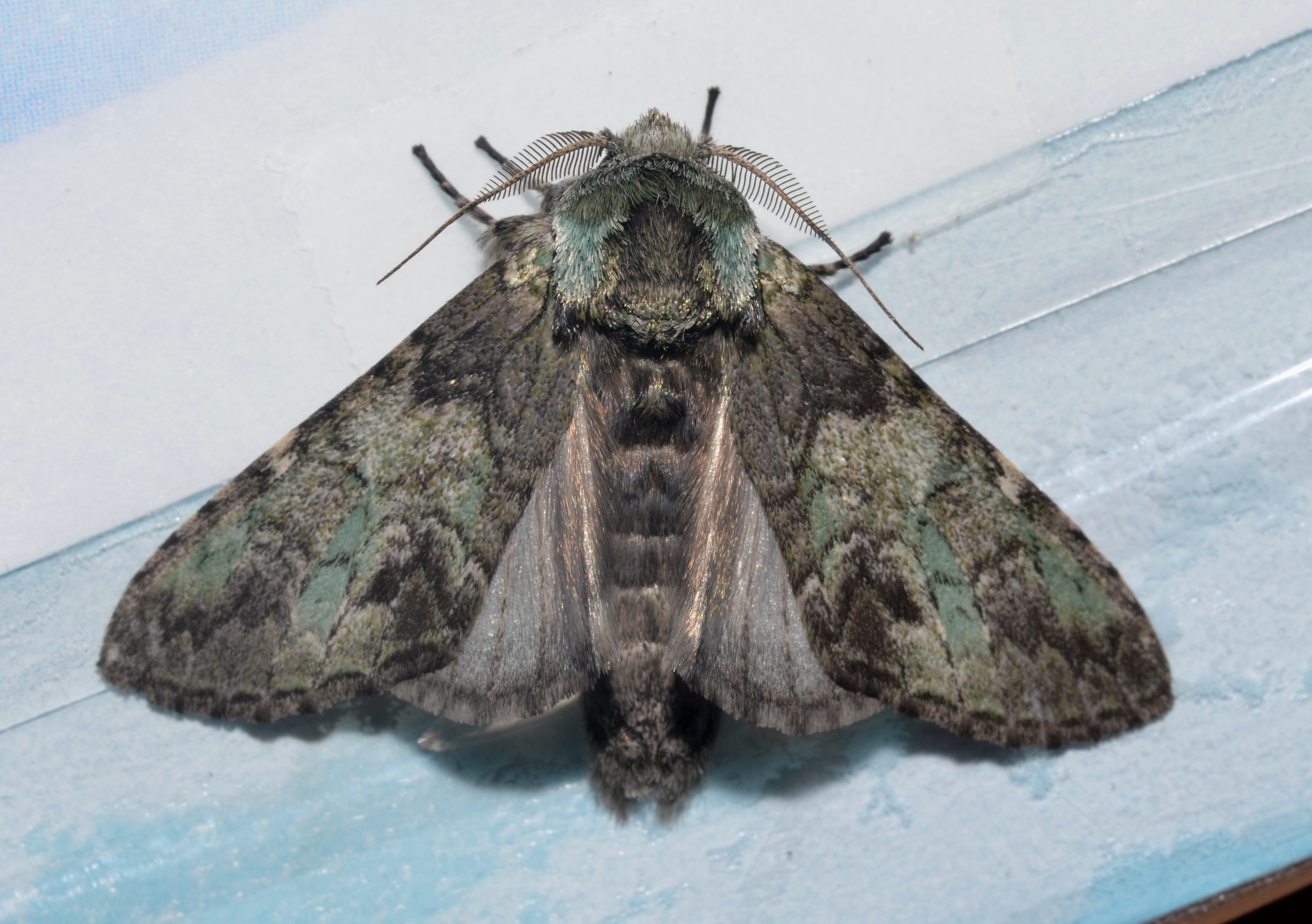

Scientific classification
- Kingdom: Animalia
- Phylum: Arthropoda
- Clade: Pancrustacea
- Class: Insecta
- Order: Lepidoptera
- Superfamily: Noctuoidea
- Family: Notodontidae
- Genus: Macrurocampa
- Species: M. marthesia

Binomial name
- Macrurocampa marthesia (Cramer, 1780)

= Macrurocampa marthesia =

Species of moth

Macrurocampa marthesia, commonly known as the mottled prominent, is a species of prominent moth in the family Notodontidae. It was described by Pieter Cramer in 1780 and is found in North America.

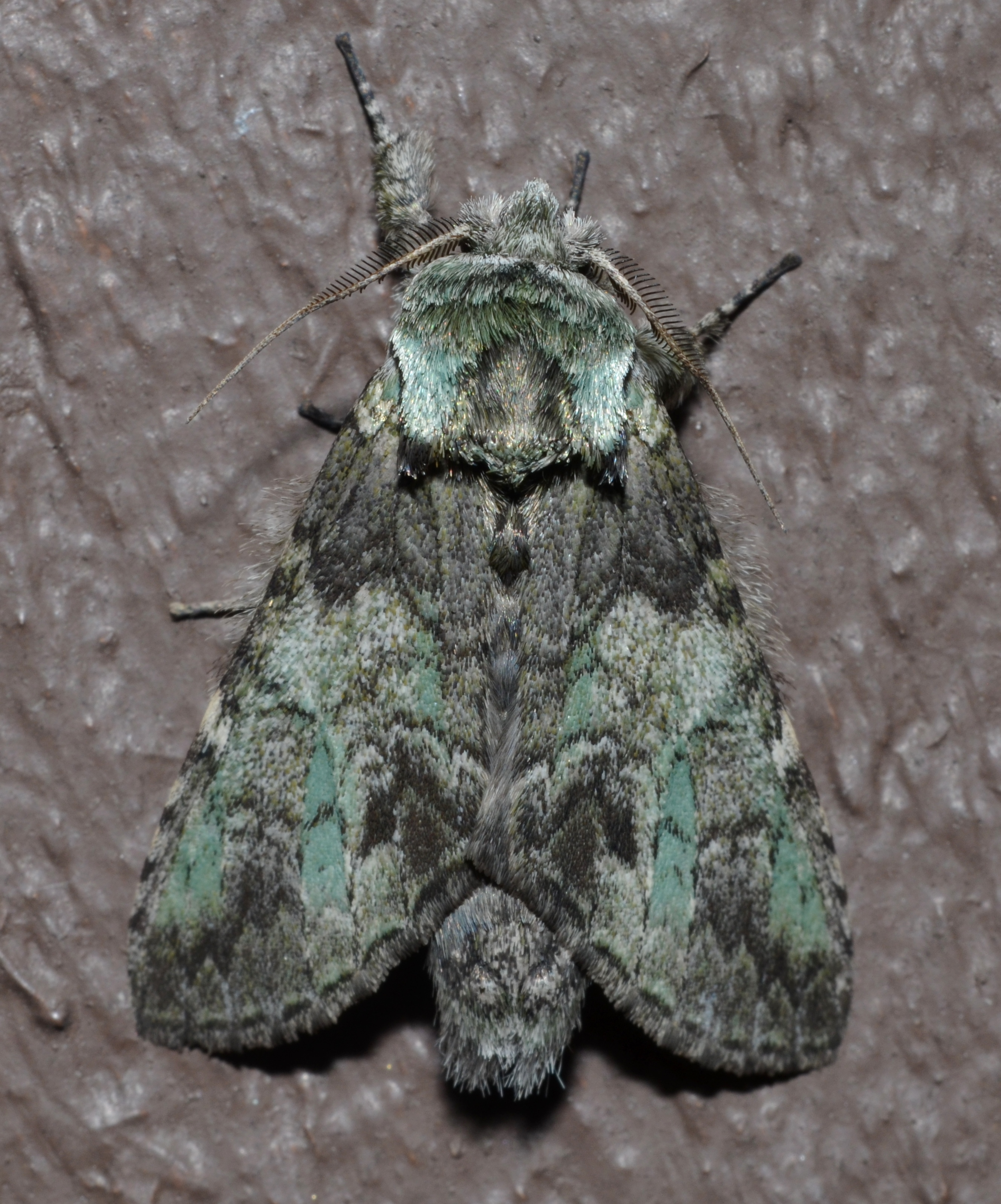
