= Azaxia luteilinea =

Scientific classification
- Kingdom: Animalia
- Phylum: Arthropoda
- Clade: Pancrustacea
- Class: Insecta
- Order: Lepidoptera
- Superfamily: Noctuoidea
- Family: Notodontidae
- Genus: Azaxia
- Species: A. luteilinea

Binomial name
- Azaxia luteilinea (H. Druce, 1904)

Synonyms
- Heterocampa luteilinea H. Druce, 1904

Species of moth

Azaxia luteilinea is a moth of the family Notodontidae first described by Herbert Druce in 1904. It is found in south-eastern Peru.
