= Macrurocampa dorothea =

Scientific classification
- Kingdom: Animalia
- Phylum: Arthropoda
- Clade: Pancrustacea
- Class: Insecta
- Order: Lepidoptera
- Superfamily: Noctuoidea
- Family: Notodontidae
- Genus: Macrurocampa
- Species: M. dorothea

Binomial name
- Macrurocampa dorothea Dyar, 1896

Species of moth

Macrurocampa dorothea is a species of moth in the family Notodontidae (the prominents). It was first described by Harrison Gray Dyar Jr. in 1896 and it is found in North America.

The MONA or Hodges number for Macrurocampa dorothea is 7976.
