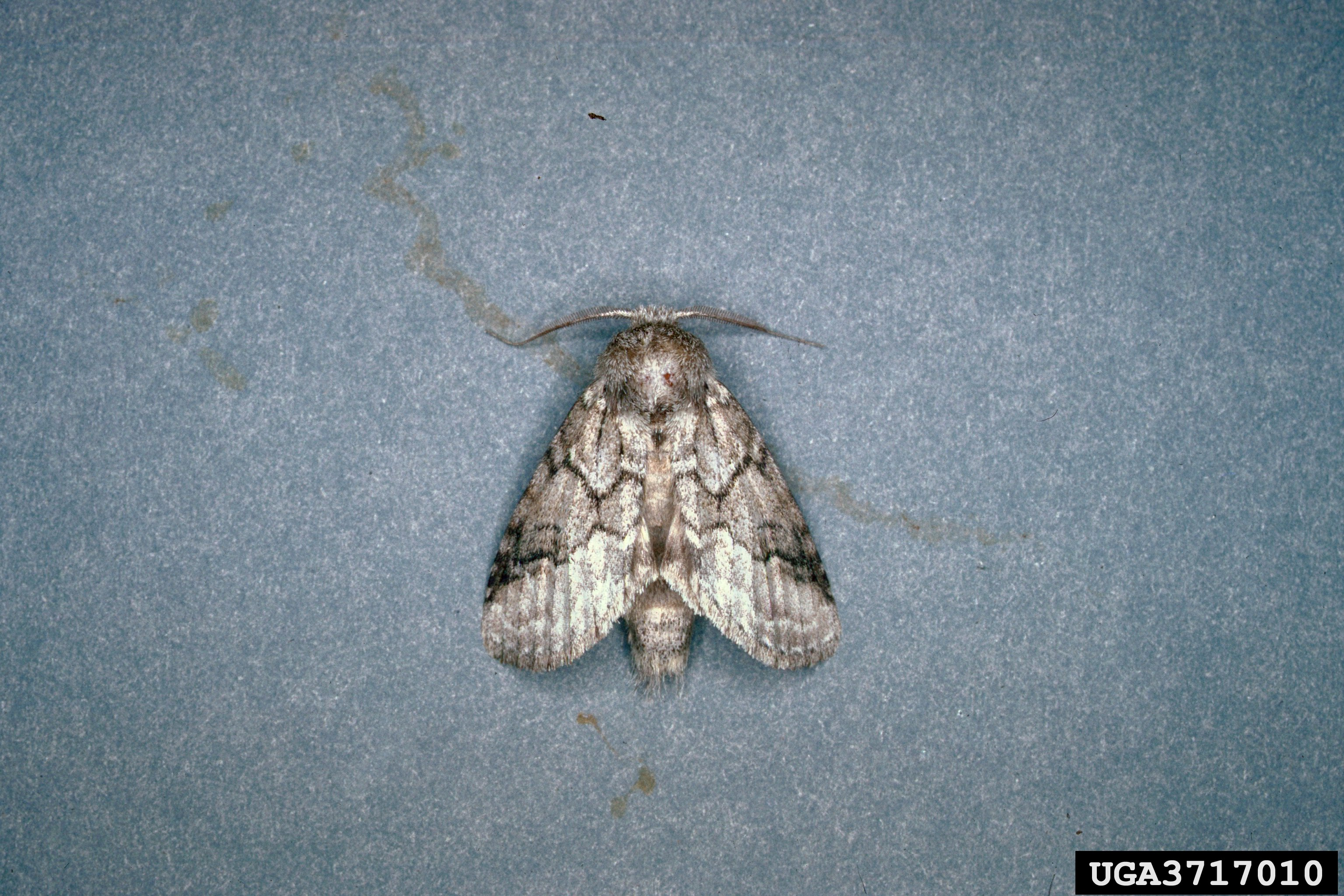

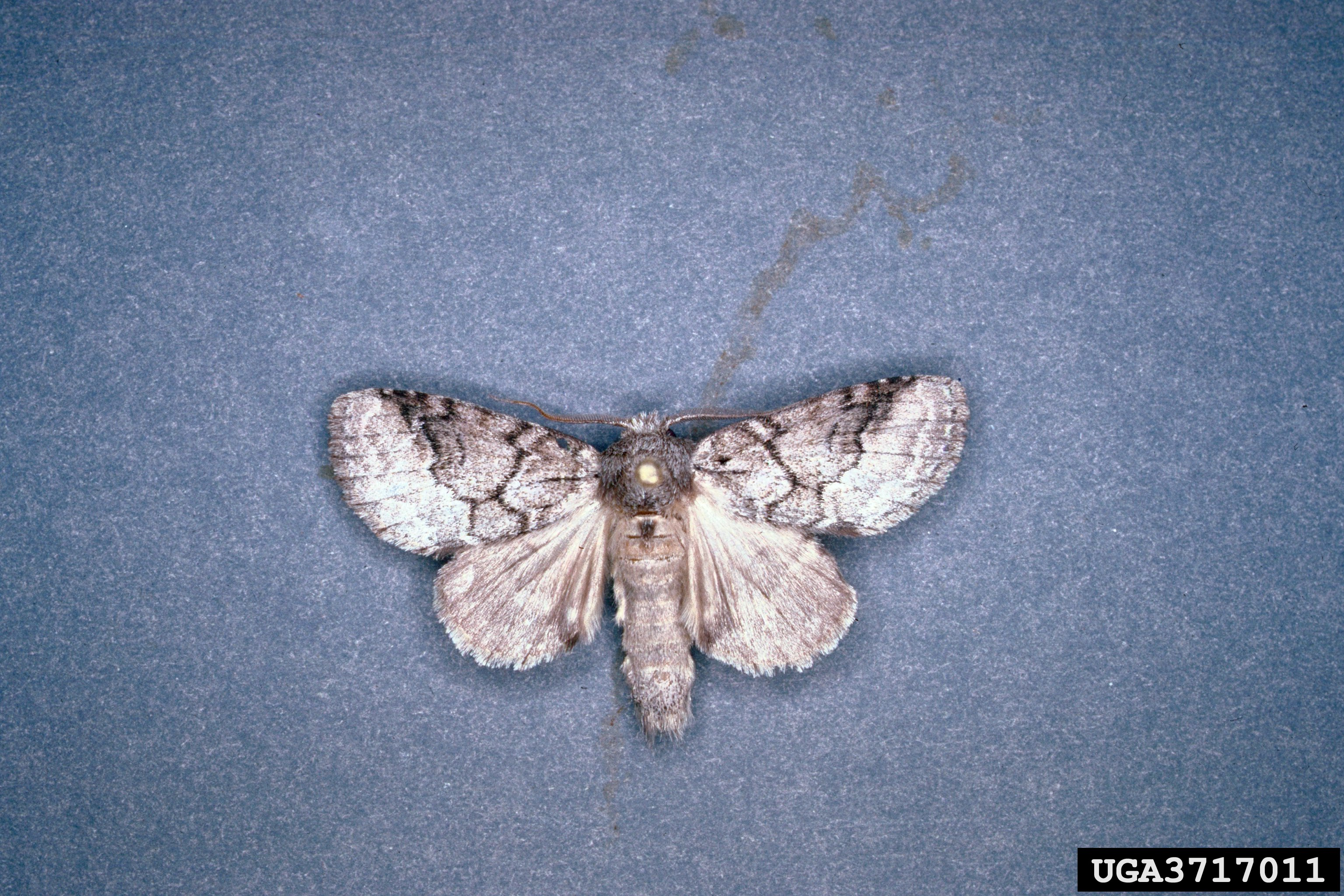

Scientific classification
- Kingdom: Animalia
- Phylum: Arthropoda
- Clade: Pancrustacea
- Class: Insecta
- Order: Lepidoptera
- Superfamily: Noctuoidea
- Family: Notodontidae
- Genus: Lochmaeus
- Species: L. bilineata

Binomial name
- Lochmaeus bilineata (Packard, 1864)

Synonyms
- Heterocampa turbida Walker, 1865; Lochmaeus turbida; Edema associata Walker, 1865; Lochmaeus associata; Notodonta ulmi Harris, 1869; Lochmaeus ulmi; Lochmaeus bilineata f. boweri (Chermock & Chermock, 1940); Seirodonta exsanguis Dyar, 1906

= Lochmaeus bilineata =

Double-lined prominent moth

Species of moth

Lochmaeus bilineata, the double-lined prominent moth, is a moth of the family Notodontidae. It is found in the eastern two-thirds of the United States and southern Canada, west to New Mexico in the south and Saskatchewan in the north.

The wingspan is 32–40 mm. Adults have grey to brownish-grey forewings. They are on wing from April to October in the south and from June to August in the north.

The larvae feed on Fagus, Quercus, Tilia, Betula and Ulmus species.

== Gallery ==
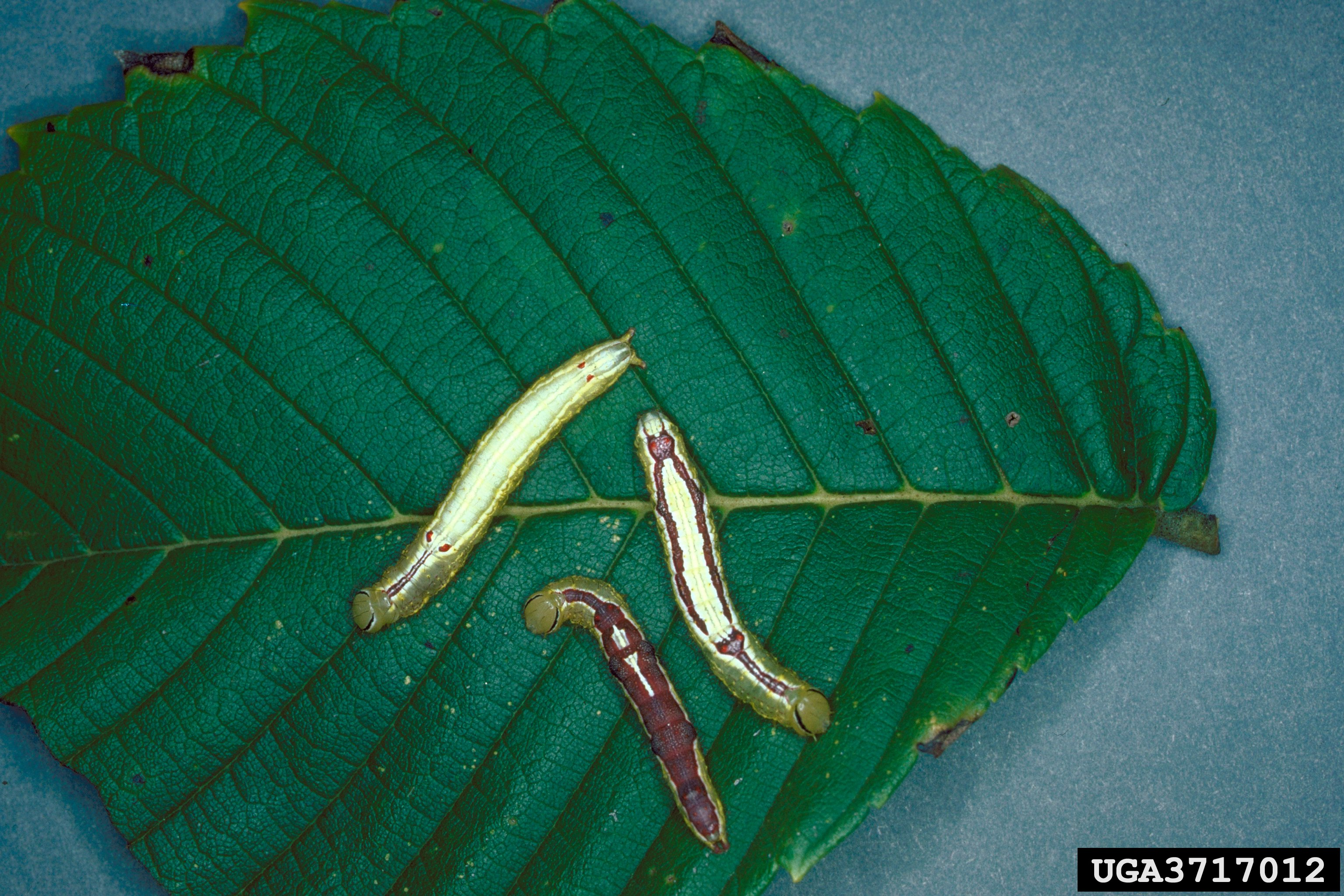
Larva

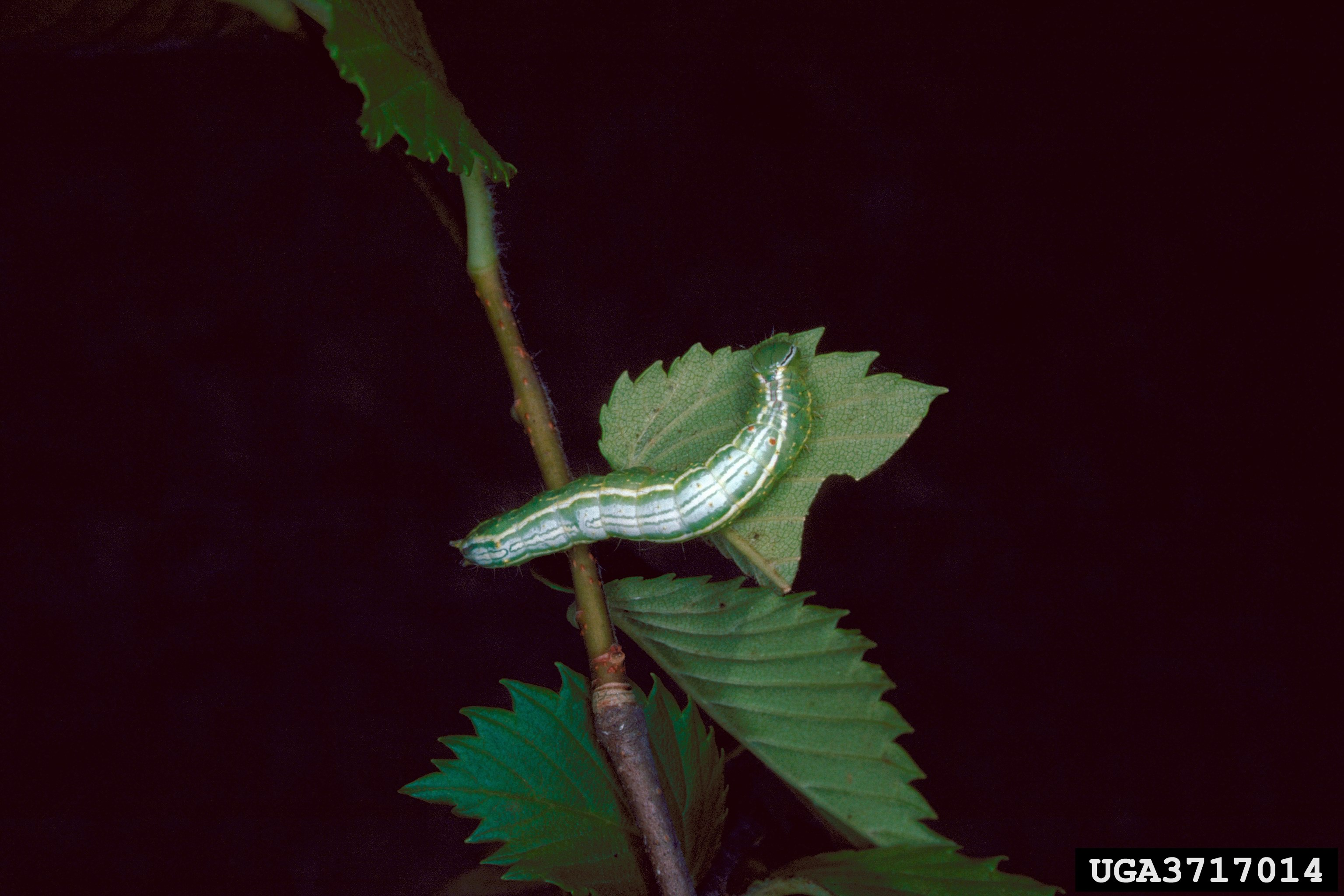
Larva
