= Scevesia angustiora =

Scientific classification
- Kingdom: Animalia
- Phylum: Arthropoda
- Clade: Pancrustacea
- Class: Insecta
- Order: Lepidoptera
- Superfamily: Noctuoidea
- Family: Notodontidae
- Genus: Scevesia
- Species: S. angustiora

Binomial name
- Scevesia angustiora (Barnes & McDunnough, 1910)

Species of moth

Scevesia angustiora is a species of moth in the family Notodontidae (the prominents). It was first described by William Barnes and James Halliday McDunnough in 1910 and it is found in North America.

The MONA or Hodges number for Scevesia angustiora is 7963.
