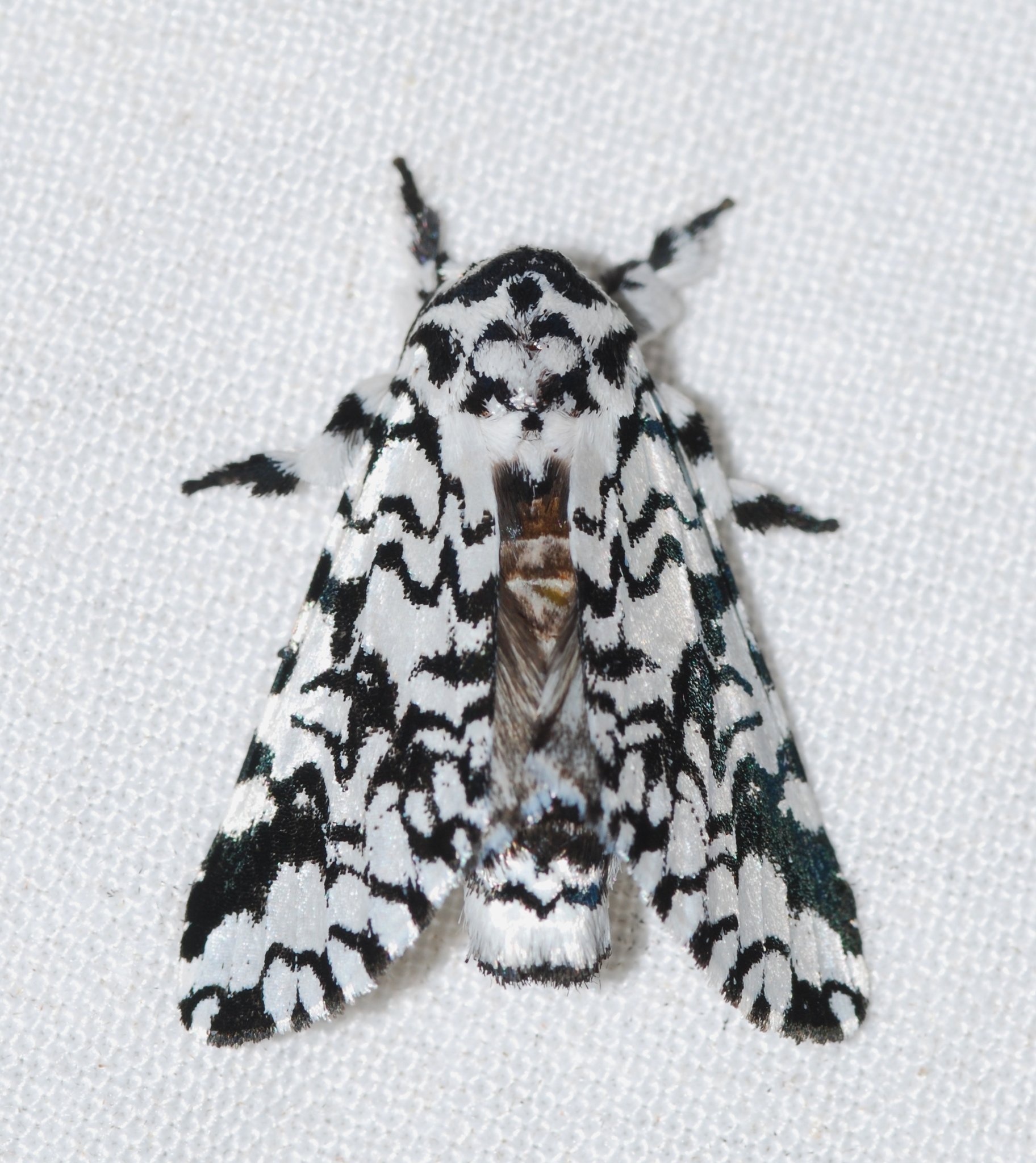
- Tecmessa gonema, Guyana

Scientific classification
- Kingdom: Animalia
- Phylum: Arthropoda
- Clade: Pancrustacea
- Class: Insecta
- Order: Lepidoptera
- Superfamily: Noctuoidea
- Family: Notodontidae
- Subfamily: Heterocampinae
- Genus: Tecmessa; Burmeister, 1878

= Tecmessa (moth) =

Genus of moths

Tecmessa is a Neotropical genus of moths of the family Notodontidae described by Hermann Burmeister in 1878, and historically confused with the Old World genus Cerura.

Tecmessa recently contained more than 20 species. As a result of research published in 2023, 17 of the species were transferred to the new genus Americerura. In the same publication, the genus Tecmessa was moved from subfamily Cerurinae to Heterocampinae.

== Species ==
These seven species belong to the genus Tecmessa:

- Tecmessa annulipes (Berg, 1878)
- Tecmessa elegans (Schaus, 1901)
- Tecmessa gonema (Schaus, 1905)
- Tecmessa laqueata (Schaus, 1911)
- Tecmessa olindata (Schaus, 1939)
- Tecmessa pedrana (Schaus, 1939)
- Tecmessa pica (Butler, 1882)
