= Afilia oslari =

Scientific classification
- Kingdom: Animalia
- Phylum: Arthropoda
- Clade: Pancrustacea
- Class: Insecta
- Order: Lepidoptera
- Superfamily: Noctuoidea
- Family: Notodontidae
- Genus: Afilia
- Species: A. oslari

Binomial name
- Afilia oslari Dyar, 1904

Species of moth

Afilia oslari is a species of moth in the family Notodontidae (the prominents). It was first described by Harrison Gray Dyar Jr. in 1904 and it is found in North America.

The MONA or Hodges number for Afilia oslari is 7962.
