= Disphragis thrinax =

Scientific classification
- Kingdom: Animalia
- Phylum: Arthropoda
- Clade: Pancrustacea
- Class: Insecta
- Order: Lepidoptera
- Superfamily: Noctuoidea
- Family: Notodontidae
- Genus: Disphragis
- Species: D. thrinax

Binomial name
- Disphragis thrinax Miller, 2011

Species of moth

Disphragis thrinax is a moth of the family Notodontidae. It is found in north-eastern Ecuador.
