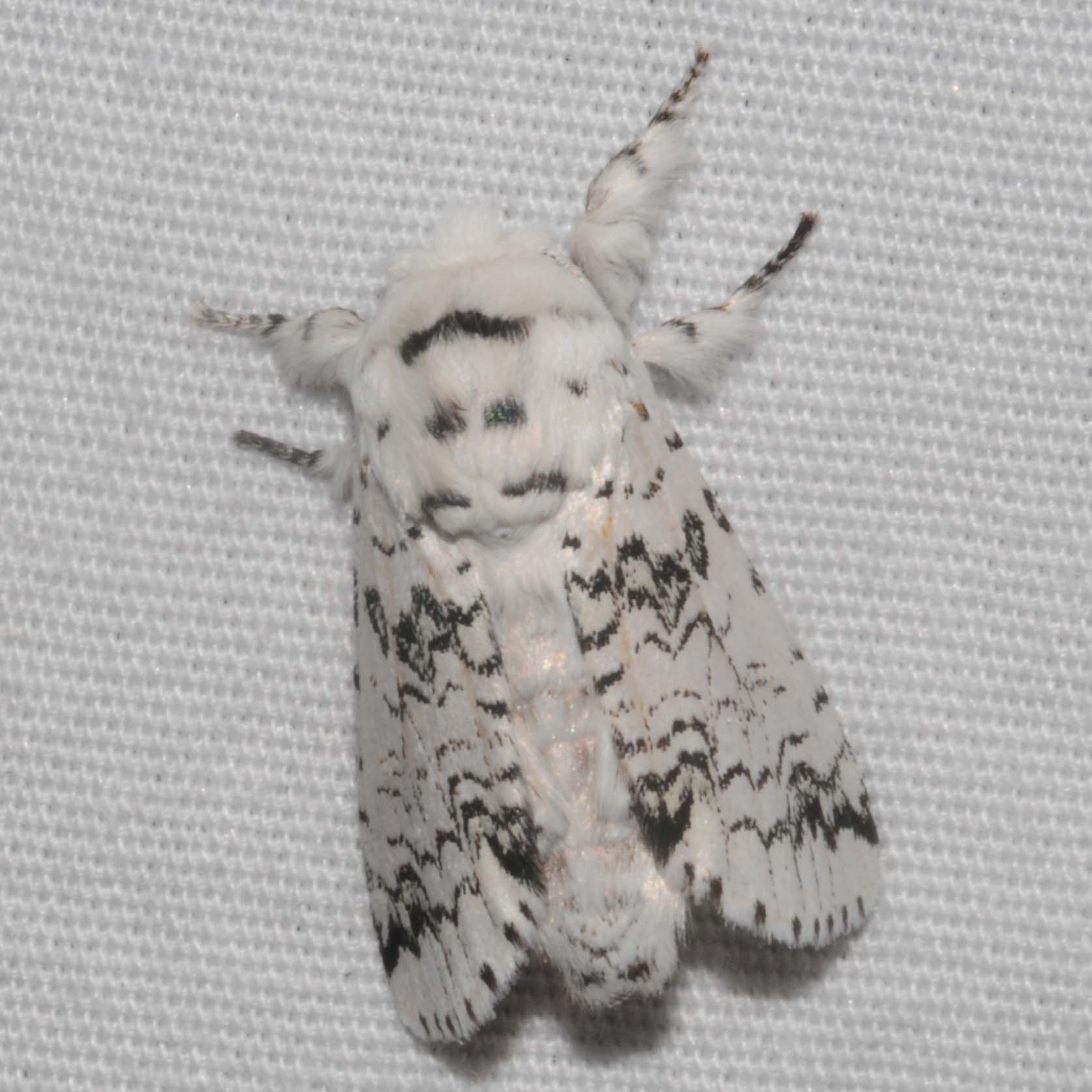

Scientific classification
- Kingdom: Animalia
- Phylum: Arthropoda
- Class: Insecta
- Order: Lepidoptera
- Superfamily: Noctuoidea
- Family: Notodontidae
- Subfamily: Cerurinae
- Genus: Americerura
- Species: A. scitiscripta

Binomial name
- Americerura scitiscripta (Walker, 1865)

Synonyms
- Tecmessa scitiscripta (Walker, 1865); Cerura scitiscripta Walker, 1865

= Americerura scitiscripta =

Black-etched prominent

Species of moth

Americerura scitiscripta, the black-etched prominent, is a moth of the family Notodontidae. It is found from Quebec west to eastern Alberta, south to Florida and Texas. The species was formerly placed the genus Tecmessa, and the genus Cerura, which is now restricted to the Old World.

The wingspan is 25–40 mm. Adults are on wing from March to October depending on the location. There are one or two generations per year depending on the location.

The larvae feed on the leaves of cherry, poplar and willow.

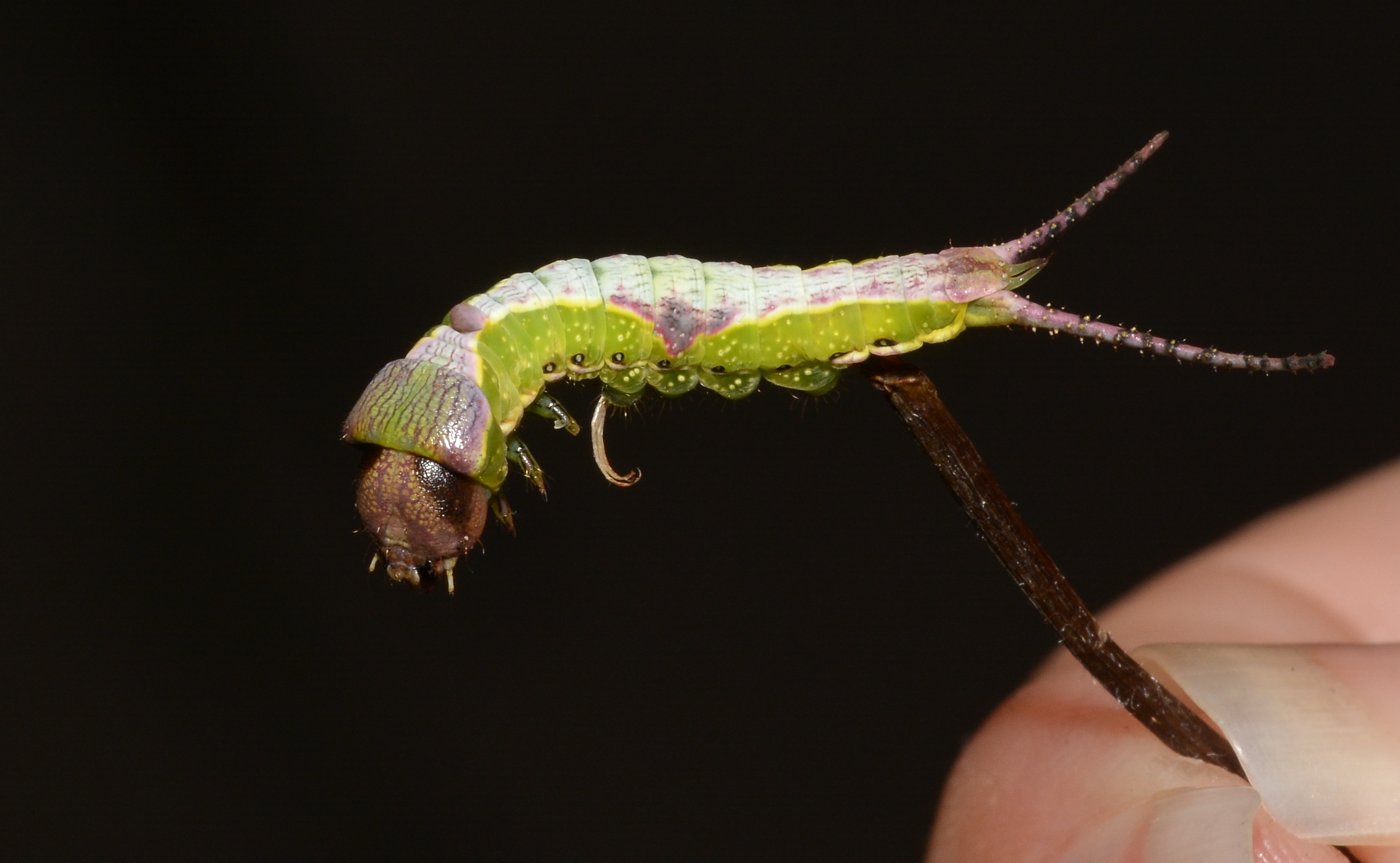
Caterpillar
