= Somera virens =

Scientific classification
- Domain: Eukaryota
- Kingdom: Animalia
- Phylum: Arthropoda
- Class: Insecta
- Order: Lepidoptera
- Superfamily: Noctuoidea
- Family: Notodontidae
- Genus: Somera
- Species: S. virens

Binomial name
- Somera virens Dierl, 1976

Synonyms
- Somera similis Nakamura, 1976

Species of moth

Somera virens is a moth of the family Notodontidae first described by Wolfgang Dierl in 1976. It is found in the north-eastern Himalayas, Sundaland and the Chinese provinces of Hainan and Yunnan.

== Subspecies ==
- Somera virens virens (north-eastern Himalayas, Sundaland)
- Somera virens watsoni Schintlmeister, 1997 (China: Hainan, Yunnan)
