= Scevesia =

Scientific classification
- Kingdom: Animalia
- Phylum: Arthropoda
- Clade: Pancrustacea
- Class: Insecta
- Order: Lepidoptera
- Superfamily: Noctuoidea
- Family: Notodontidae
- Subfamily: Heterocampinae
- Genus: Scevesia; Dyar, 1916

Synonyms
- Skewesia Dyar, 1916

Genus of moths

Scevesia is a genus of moths of the family Notodontidae erected by Harrison Gray Dyar Jr. in 1916.

== Species ==
- Scevesia angustiora (Barnes & McDunnough, 1910)
- Scevesia broidricci (Dyar, 1916)
