= Meragisa zebrina =

Scientific classification
- Kingdom: Animalia
- Phylum: Arthropoda
- Clade: Pancrustacea
- Class: Insecta
- Order: Lepidoptera
- Superfamily: Noctuoidea
- Family: Notodontidae
- Genus: Meragisa
- Species: M. zebrina

Binomial name
- Meragisa zebrina Miller, 2011

Species of moth

Meragisa zebrina is a moth of the family Notodontidae. It is found in north-eastern Ecuador.

The length of the forewings is about 21.5 mm.
