= Rifargia distinguenda =

Scientific classification
- Kingdom: Animalia
- Phylum: Arthropoda
- Clade: Pancrustacea
- Class: Insecta
- Order: Lepidoptera
- Superfamily: Noctuoidea
- Family: Notodontidae
- Genus: Rifargia
- Species: R. distinguenda

Binomial name
- Rifargia distinguenda (Walker, 1856)

Species of moth

Rifargia distinguenda is a species of moth in the family Notodontidae (the prominents). It was first described by Francis Walker in 1856 and it is found in North America.

The MONA or Hodges number for Rifargia distinguenda is 7966.
