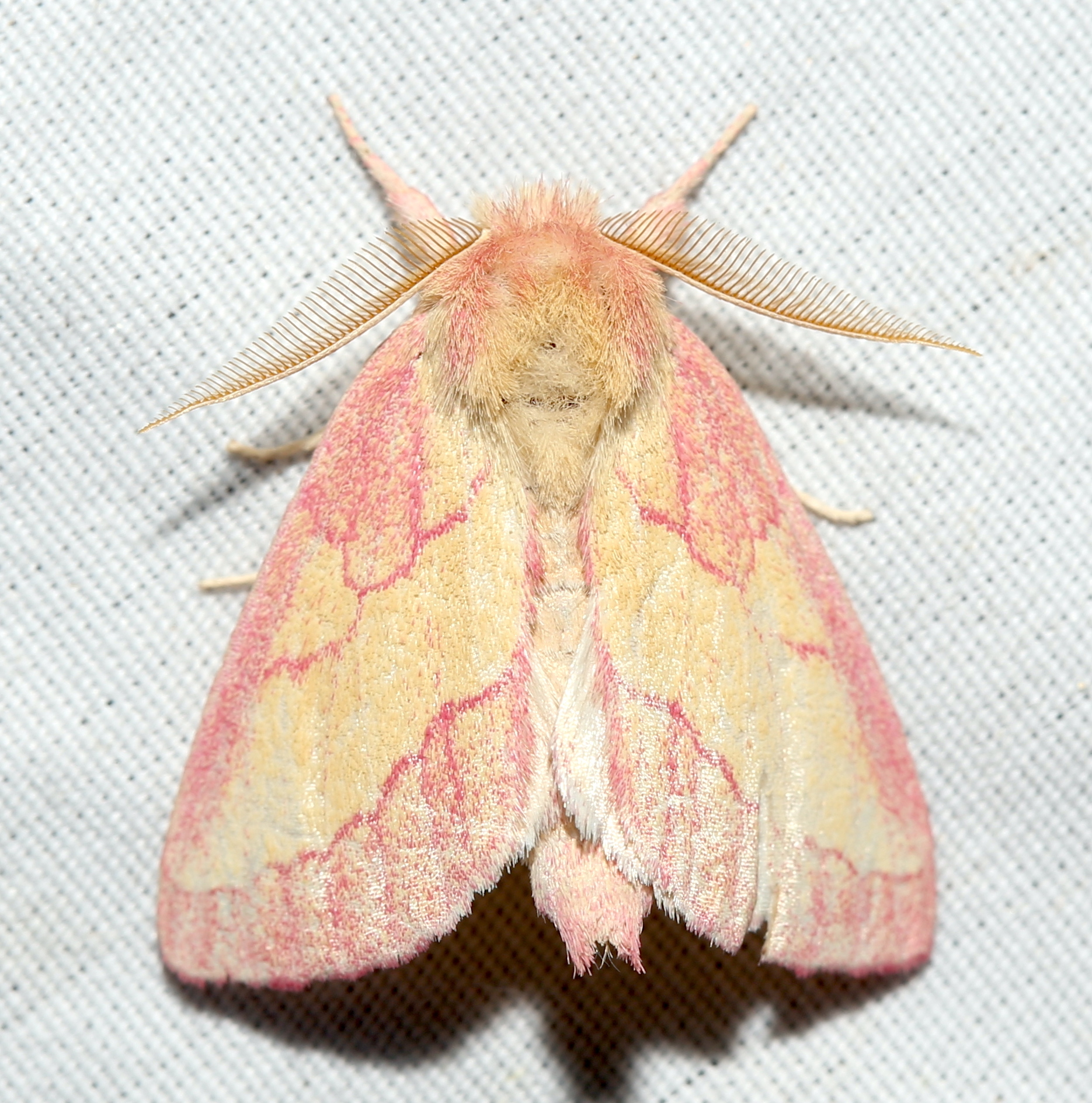
- Adult
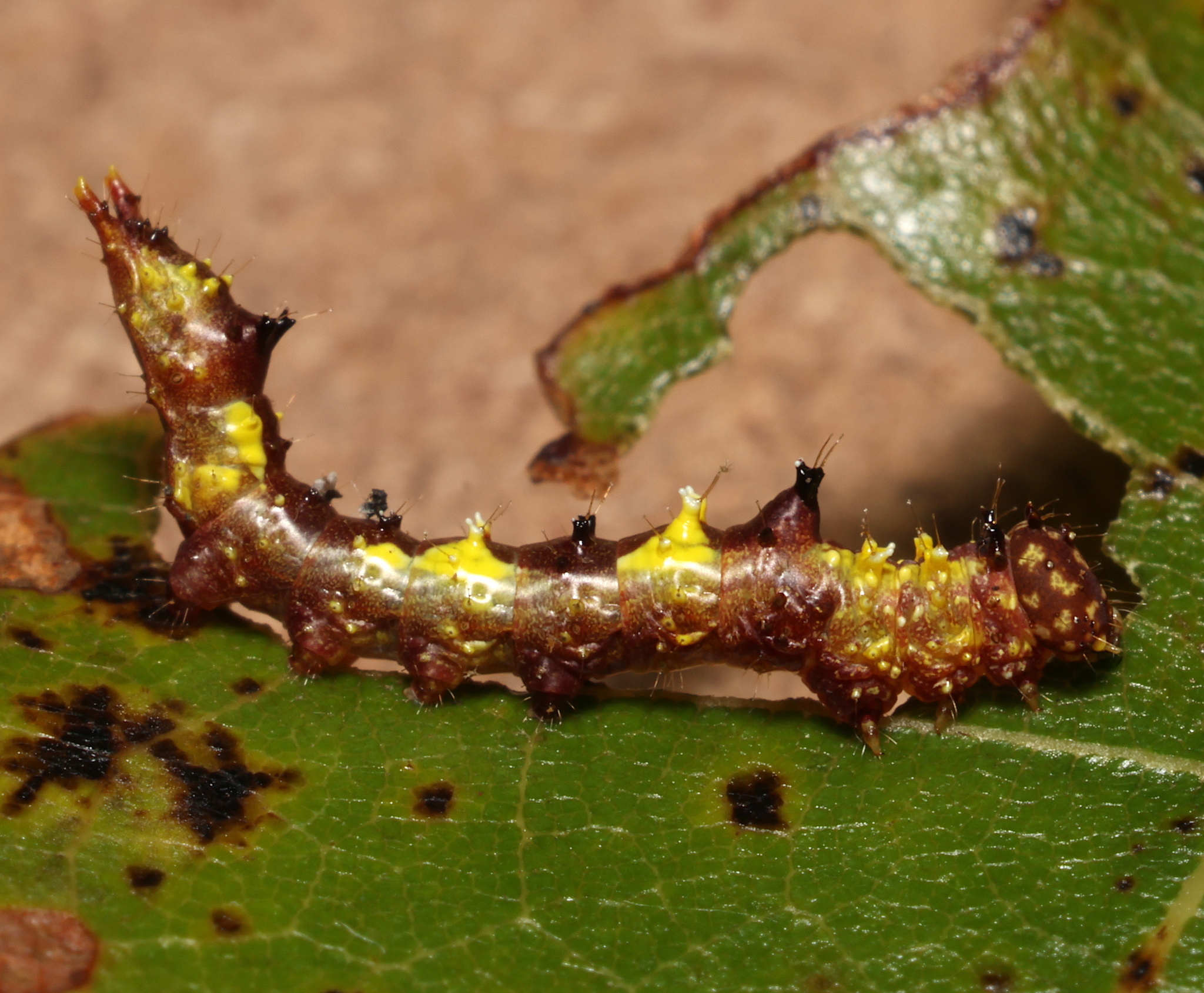
- Larva on Quercus margaretiae

Scientific classification
- Kingdom: Animalia
- Phylum: Arthropoda
- Clade: Pancrustacea
- Class: Insecta
- Order: Lepidoptera
- Superfamily: Noctuoidea
- Family: Notodontidae
- Genus: Hyparpax
- Species: H. aurora

Binomial name
- Hyparpax aurora (Smith, 1797)

Synonyms
- Phalaena aurora Smith, 1797; Sangata rosea Walker, 1860; Dryocampa venusta Walker, 1865

= Hyparpax aurora =

Species of moth

Hyparpax aurora, the pink prominent, is a moth in the family Notodontidae found in eastern North America. The species is listed as being of special concern in the US state of Connecticut. The species was described by James Edward Smith in 1797.

The wingspan is 30–36 mm. Adults have a distinct pink and yellow colouration.

The larval host plants are in the genera Quercus and Viburnum.
