= Hyparpax =

Scientific classification
- Kingdom: Animalia
- Phylum: Arthropoda
- Clade: Pancrustacea
- Class: Insecta
- Order: Lepidoptera
- Superfamily: Noctuoidea
- Family: Notodontidae
- Subfamily: Heterocampinae
- Genus: Hyparpax; Hübner, [1825]

Genus of moths

Hyparpax is a genus of moths of the family Notodontidae described by Jacob Hübner in 1825.

== Species ==
- Hyparpax aurora (Smith, 1797)
- Hyparpax venus Neumoegen, 1892
- Hyparpax minor (Barnes & Benjamin, 1924)
- Hyparpax aurostriata Graef, 1888
- Hyparpax perophoroides (Strecker, 1876)
