= Meragisa dasra =

Scientific classification
- Kingdom: Animalia
- Phylum: Arthropoda
- Clade: Pancrustacea
- Class: Insecta
- Order: Lepidoptera
- Superfamily: Noctuoidea
- Family: Notodontidae
- Genus: Meragisa
- Species: M. dasra

Binomial name
- Meragisa dasra Dognin, 1904

Species of moth

Meragisa dasra is a moth of the family Notodontidae. It is found in south-eastern Peru.
