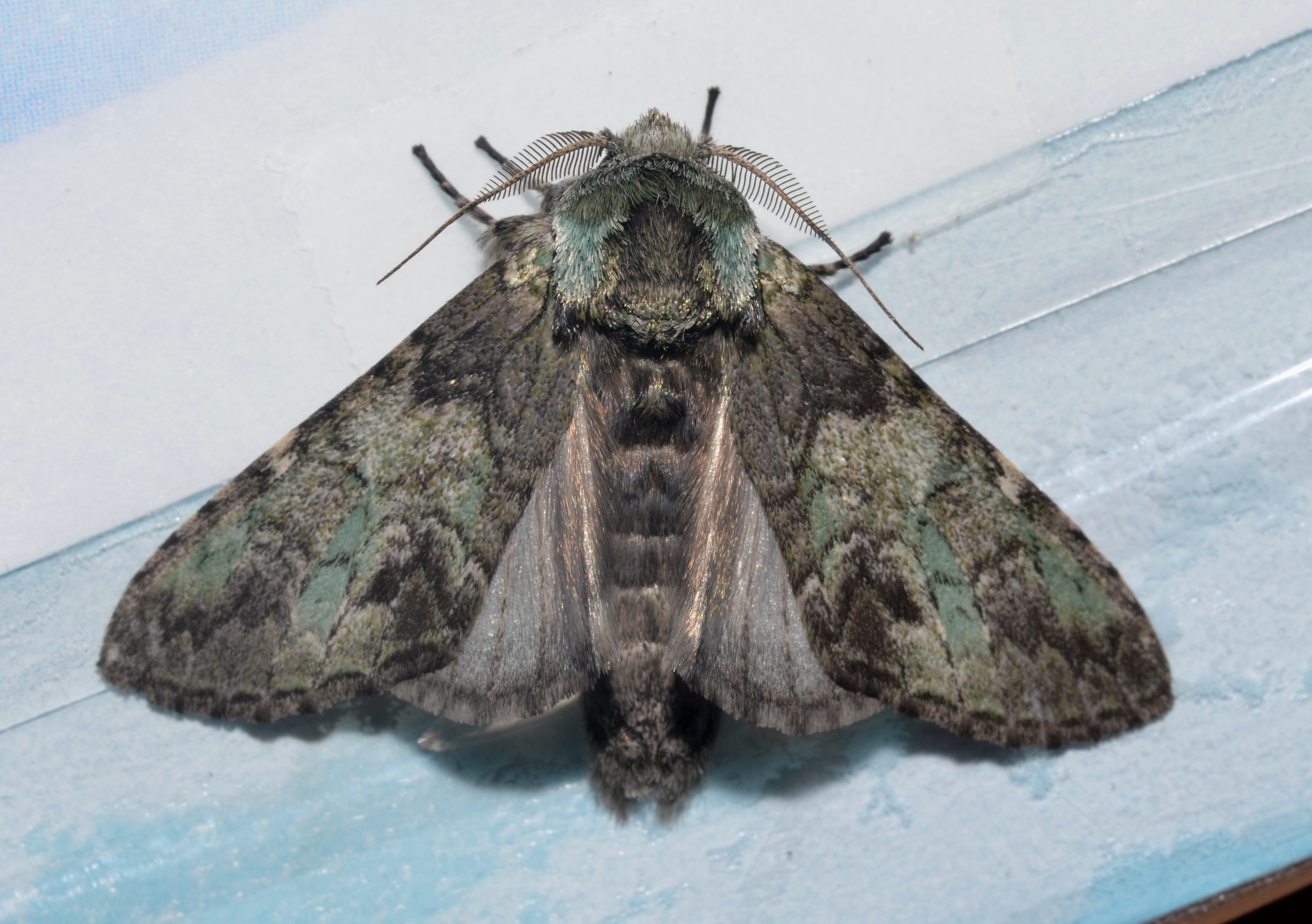
- Macrurocampa marthesia, mottled prominent

Scientific classification
- Kingdom: Animalia
- Phylum: Arthropoda
- Clade: Pancrustacea
- Class: Insecta
- Order: Lepidoptera
- Superfamily: Noctuoidea
- Family: Notodontidae
- Subfamily: Heterocampinae
- Genus: Macrurocampa; Dyar, 1893

= Macrurocampa =

Genus of moths

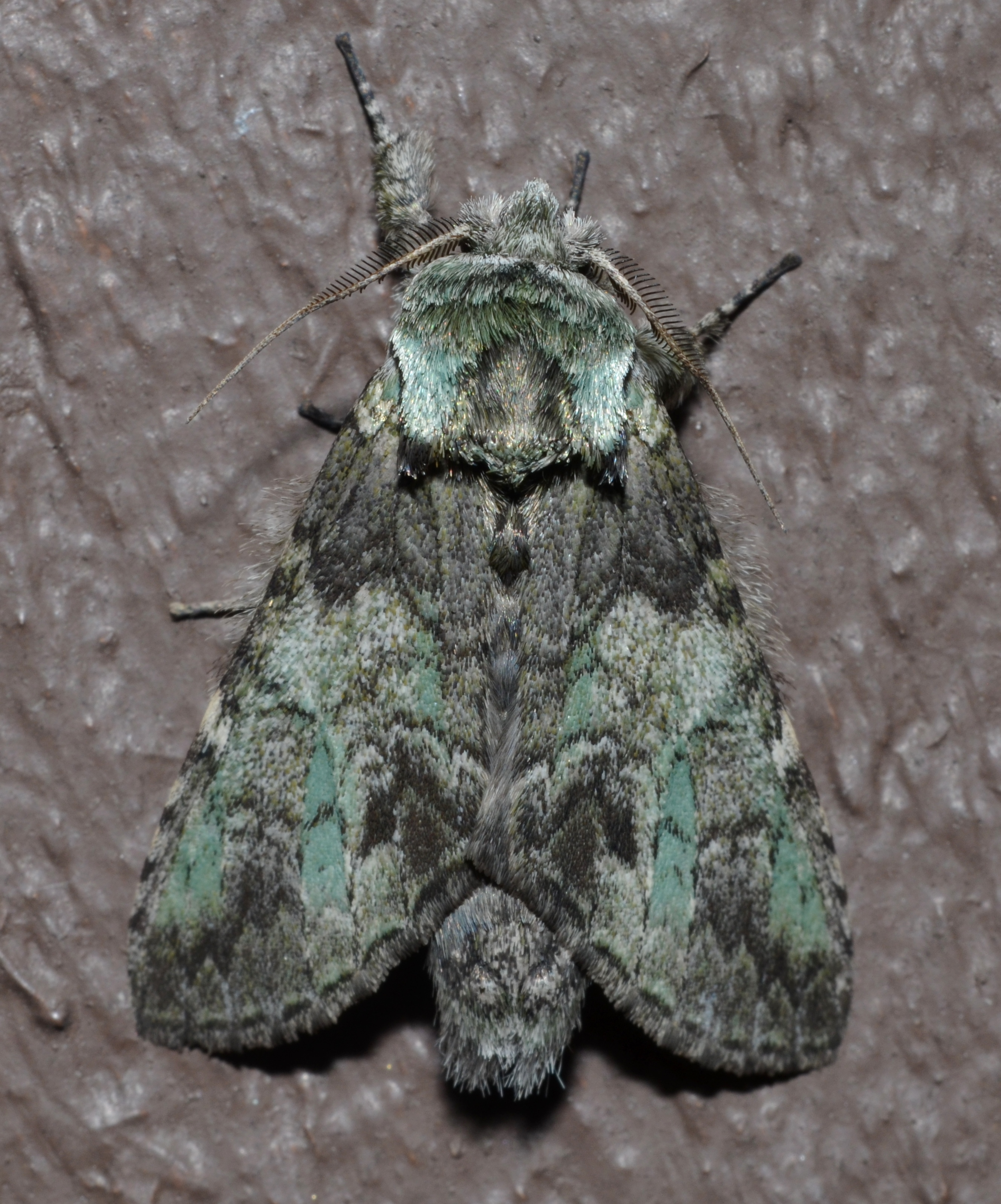
Macrurocampa marthesia, mottled prominent

Macrurocampa is a genus of moths of the family Notodontidae erected by Harrison Gray Dyar Jr. in 1893. They are found primarily in North America.

== Species ==
These nine species belong to the genus Macrurocampa:

- Macrurocampa alpina (Benjamin, 1932)
- Macrurocampa dolorosa (Schaus, 1911)
- Macrurocampa dorothea Dyar, 1896
- Macrurocampa frisoni (Barnes & Benjamin, 1927)
- Macrurocampa gigantea (Barnes & Benjamin, 1924)
- Macrurocampa marthesia (Cramer, 1780) (mottled prominent)
- Macrurocampa miranda Dyar, 1905
- Macrurocampa ruficornis Dyar, 1905
- Macrurocampa zayasi (Torre & Alayo, 1959) (blue moor-grass moth)
