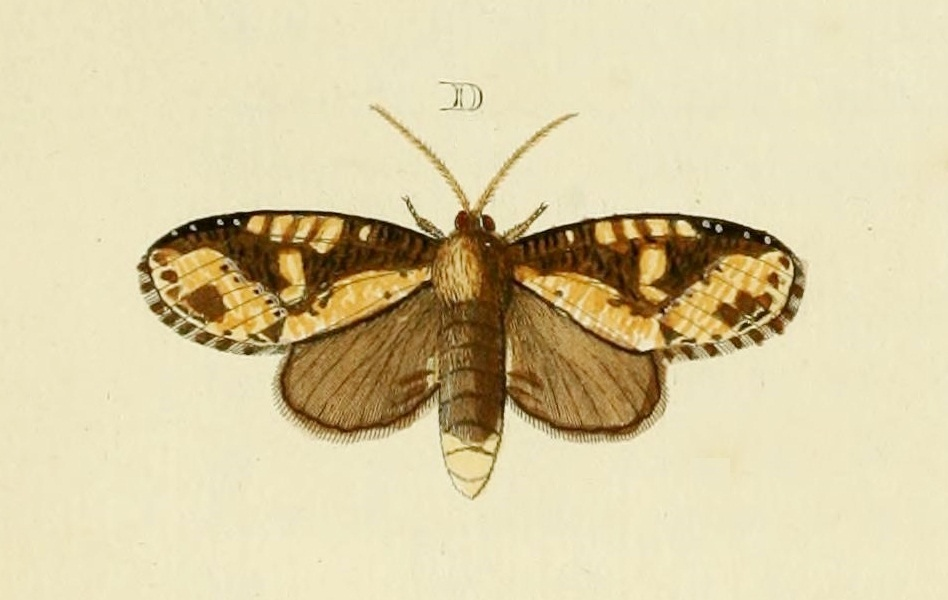
- Disphragis tharis

Scientific classification
- Kingdom: Animalia
- Phylum: Arthropoda
- Clade: Pancrustacea
- Class: Insecta
- Order: Lepidoptera
- Superfamily: Noctuoidea
- Family: Notodontidae
- Subfamily: Heterocampinae
- Genus: Disphragis; Hübner, [1820]

= Disphragis =

Species of moth

Disphragis is a genus of moths of the family Notodontidae erected by Jacob Hübner in 1820. The genus is confined to the New World and it contains about 137 species.

== Selected species ==
- Disphragis albovirens Dognin, 1908
- Disphragis anatole Miller, 2011
- Disphragis bifurcata Sullivan & Pogue, 2014
- Disphragis captiosa Draudt, 1932
- Disphragis cubana (Grote, 1865)
- Disphragis delira (Schaus, 1905)
- Disphragis disvirens Miller, 2011
- Disphragis hemicera (Schaus, 1910)
- Disphragis manethusa (Druce, 1887)
- Disphragis notabilis Schaus, 1906
- Disphragis rhodoglene Miller, 2011
- Disphragis sobolis Miller, 2011
- Disphragis splendens Druce, 1911
- Disphragis tharis (Stoll, 1780)
- Disphragis thrinax Miller, 2011
- Disphragis tricolor Druce, 1911
- Disphragis vivida Schaus, 1910

== Former species ==
- Disphragis normula Dognin, 1909
