= Hyparpax perophoroides =

Scientific classification
- Kingdom: Animalia
- Phylum: Arthropoda
- Clade: Pancrustacea
- Class: Insecta
- Order: Lepidoptera
- Superfamily: Noctuoidea
- Family: Notodontidae
- Genus: Hyparpax
- Species: H. perophoroides

Binomial name
- Hyparpax perophoroides (Strecker, 1876)

Species of moth

Hyparpax perophoroides, the red-lined yellow prominent or lilac moth, is a species of moth in the family Notodontidae (the prominents). It was first described by Strecker in 1876 and it is found in North America.

The MONA or Hodges number for Hyparpax perophoroides is 8026.
