= Azaxia dyari =

Scientific classification
- Kingdom: Animalia
- Phylum: Arthropoda
- Clade: Pancrustacea
- Class: Insecta
- Order: Lepidoptera
- Superfamily: Noctuoidea
- Family: Notodontidae
- Genus: Azaxia
- Species: A. dyari

Binomial name
- Azaxia dyari Schaus, 1911

Species of moth from Costa Rica

Azaxia dyari is a moth of the family Notodontidae. It is found in Costa Rica.
