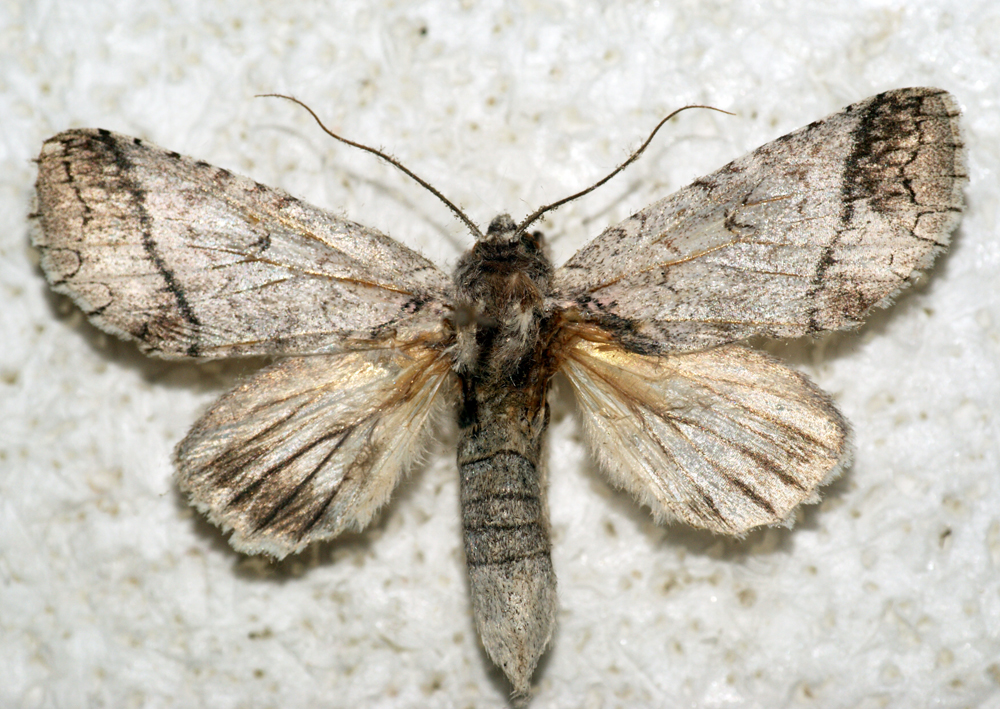

Scientific classification
- Kingdom: Animalia
- Phylum: Arthropoda
- Clade: Pancrustacea
- Class: Insecta
- Order: Lepidoptera
- Superfamily: Noctuoidea
- Family: Notodontidae
- Genus: Rifargia
- Species: R. lineata

Binomial name
- Rifargia lineata Druce, 1887

= Rifargia lineata =

Species of moth

Rifargia lineata is a species of moth in the family Notodontidae (the prominents). It was first described by Druce in 1887 and it is found in North America.

The MONA or Hodges number for Rifargia lineata is 7967.
