= Theroa =

Scientific classification
- Kingdom: Animalia
- Phylum: Arthropoda
- Clade: Pancrustacea
- Class: Insecta
- Order: Lepidoptera
- Superfamily: Noctuoidea
- Family: Notodontidae
- Subfamily: Heterocampinae
- Genus: Theroa; Schaus, 1901

Genus of moths

Theroa is a genus of moths of the family Notodontidae erected by William Schaus in 1901.

== Species ==
- Theroa zethus (Druce, 1898)
- Theroa amathynta (Dyar, 1918)
