= Hyparpax aurostriata =

Scientific classification
- Kingdom: Animalia
- Phylum: Arthropoda
- Clade: Pancrustacea
- Class: Insecta
- Order: Lepidoptera
- Superfamily: Noctuoidea
- Family: Notodontidae
- Genus: Hyparpax
- Species: H. aurostriata

Binomial name
- Hyparpax aurostriata Graef, 1888

Species of moth

Hyparpax aurostriata

Hyparpax aurostriata is a species of moth in the family Notodontidae (the prominents). It was first described by Graef in 1888 and it is found in North America.

The MONA or Hodges number for Hyparpax aurostriata is 8025.
