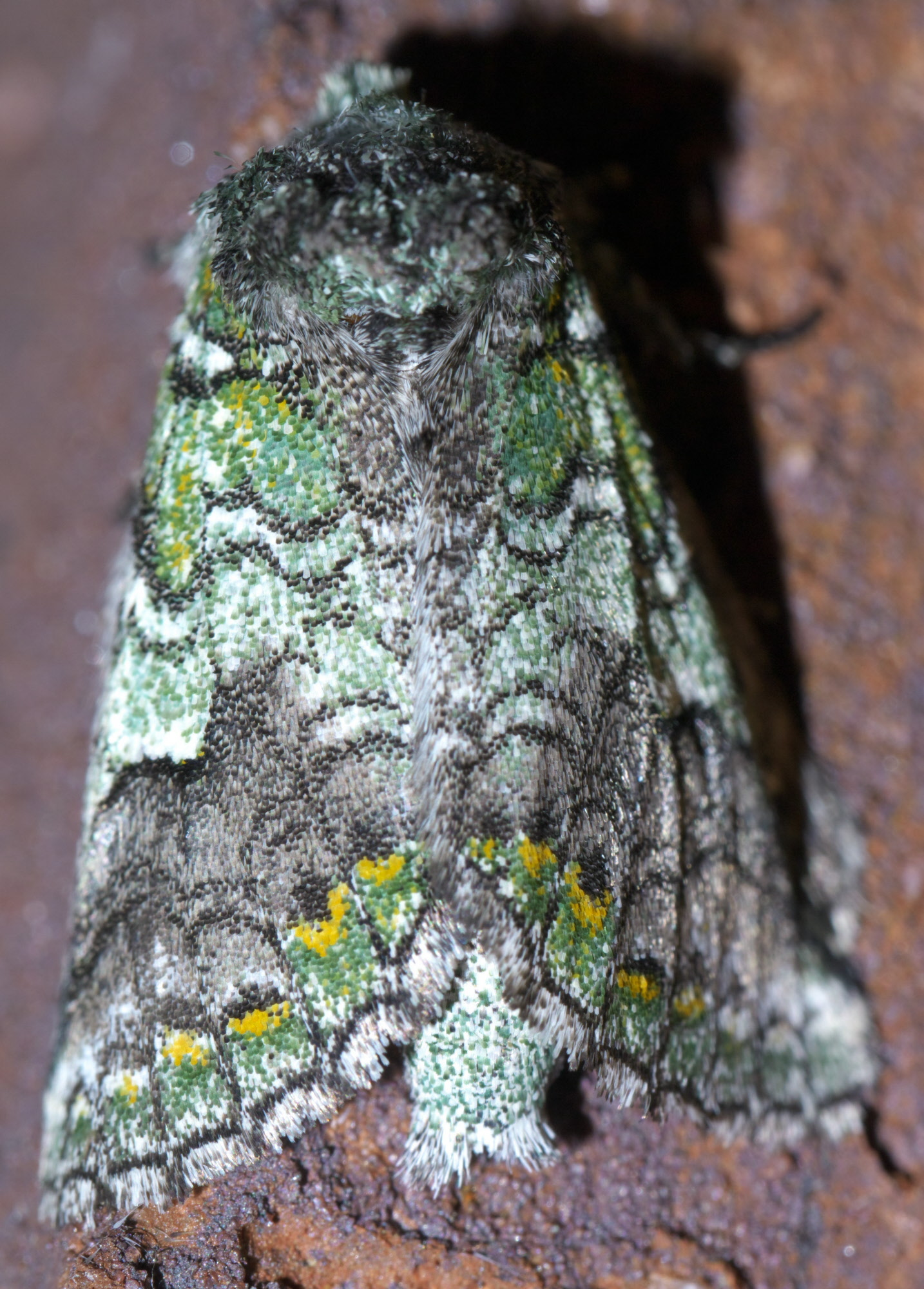

Scientific classification
- Kingdom: Animalia
- Phylum: Arthropoda
- Clade: Pancrustacea
- Class: Insecta
- Order: Lepidoptera
- Superfamily: Noctuoidea
- Family: Notodontidae
- Genus: Litodonta
- Species: L. hydromeli

Binomial name
- Litodonta hydromeli Harvey, 1876

= Litodonta hydromeli =

Species of moth

Litodonta hydromeli, or Harvey's prominent moth, is a species of moth in the family Notodontidae (the prominents). It was first described by Leon F. Harvey in 1876 and it is found in North America.

The MONA or Hodges number for Litodonta hydromeli is 7968.

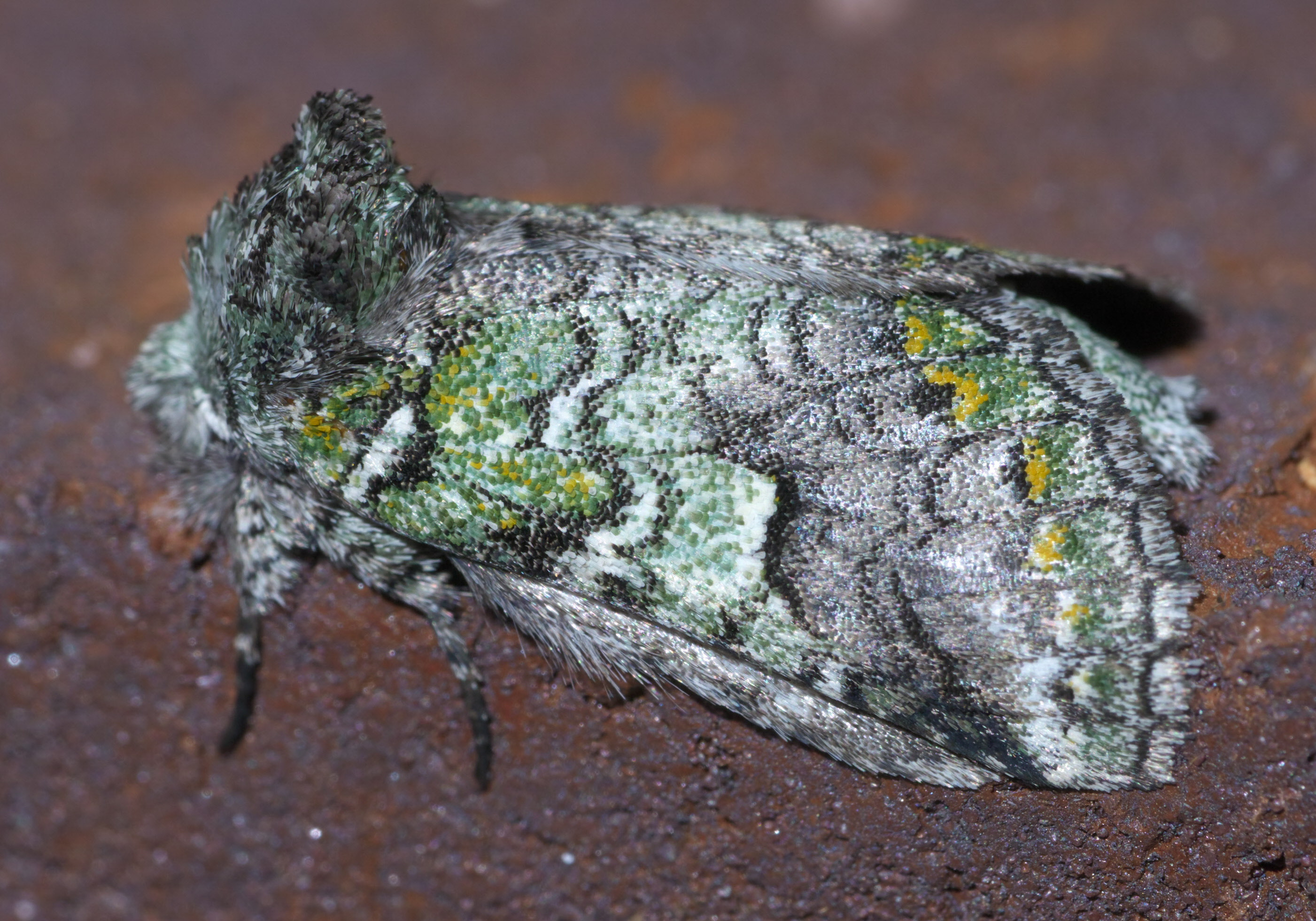
Harvey's prominent moth, Litodonta hydromeli
