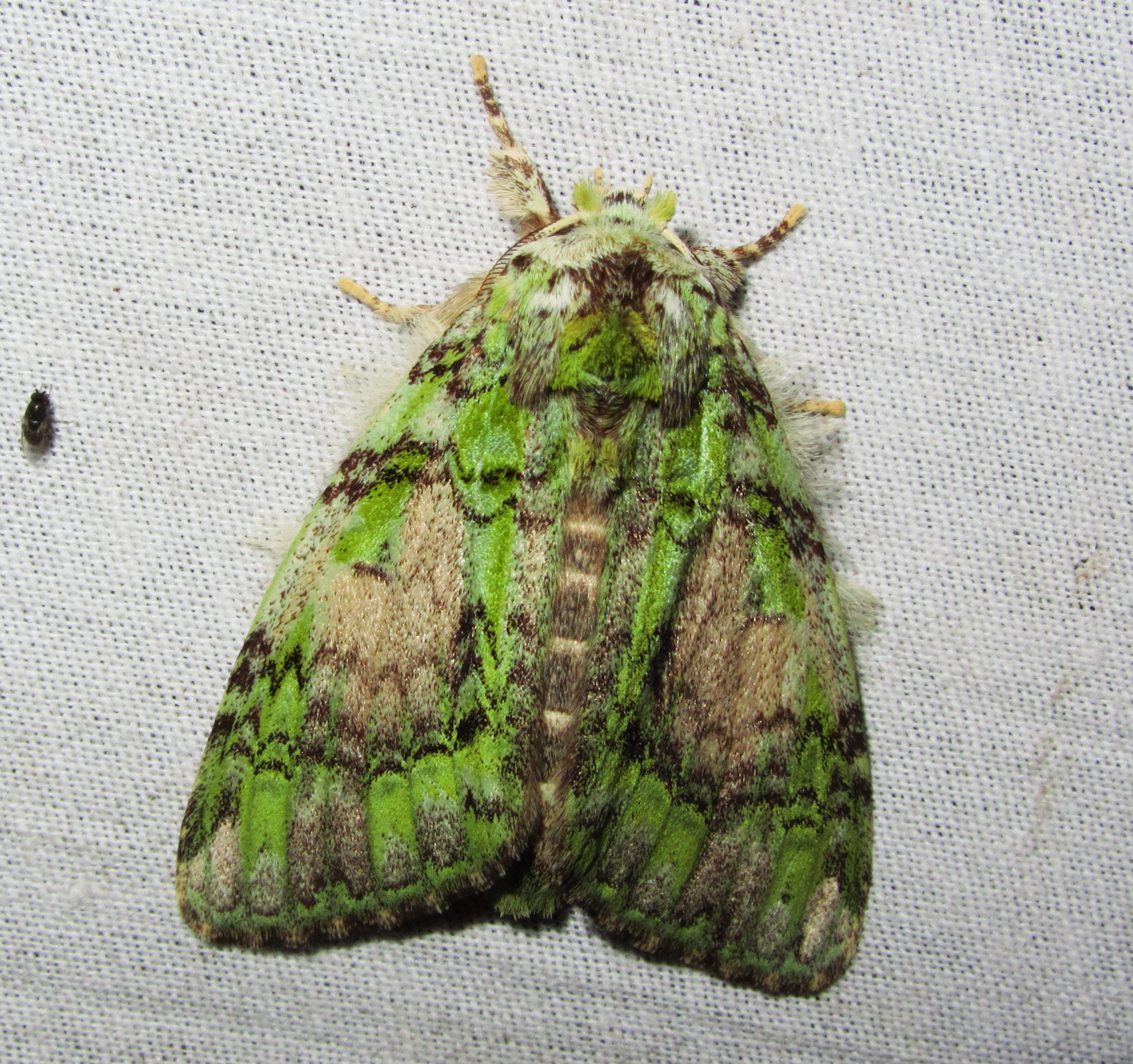

Scientific classification
- Domain: Eukaryota
- Kingdom: Animalia
- Phylum: Arthropoda
- Class: Insecta
- Order: Lepidoptera
- Superfamily: Noctuoidea
- Family: Notodontidae
- Genus: Somera; Walker, 1855

= Somera (moth) =

Genus of moths

Somera is a genus of moths of the family Notodontidae. The genus was erected by Francis Walker in 1855.

== Species ==
- Somera virens Dierl, 1976
- Somera viridifusca Walker, 1855 – prominent moth
- Somera viriviri Kobayashi, 2012
