= Drugera santiago =

Scientific classification
- Kingdom: Animalia
- Phylum: Arthropoda
- Clade: Pancrustacea
- Class: Insecta
- Order: Lepidoptera
- Superfamily: Noctuoidea
- Family: Notodontidae
- Genus: Drugera
- Species: D. santiago

Binomial name
- Drugera santiago Thiaucourt & Miller, 2011

Species of moth

Drugera santiago is a moth of the family Notodontidae. It is found in north-eastern Ecuador.

The length of the forewings is about 22.5 mm.
