= Rifargia bichorda =

Scientific classification
- Kingdom: Animalia
- Phylum: Arthropoda
- Clade: Pancrustacea
- Class: Insecta
- Order: Lepidoptera
- Superfamily: Noctuoidea
- Family: Notodontidae
- Genus: Rifargia
- Species: R. bichorda

Binomial name
- Rifargia bichorda (Hampson, 1901)

Species of moth

Rifargia bichorda, or Hampson's prominent moth, is a species of moth in the family Notodontidae (the prominents). It was first described by George Hampson in 1901 and it is found in North America.
