= Disphragis anatole =

Scientific classification
- Kingdom: Animalia
- Phylum: Arthropoda
- Clade: Pancrustacea
- Class: Insecta
- Order: Lepidoptera
- Superfamily: Noctuoidea
- Family: Notodontidae
- Genus: Disphragis
- Species: D. anatole

Binomial name
- Disphragis anatole Miller, 2011

Species of moth

Disphragis anatole is a moth of the family Notodontidae. It is found in north-eastern Ecuador and possibly eastern Peru.

The length of the forewings is 17.5–23 mm.
