= Manteo, Virginia =

Unincorporated community in Virginia, United States

Coordinates: 37°40′37″N 78°39′48″W

Manteo is an unincorporated community in Buckingham County, in the U.S. state of Virginia.
