= Praeschausia =

Scientific classification
- Kingdom: Animalia
- Phylum: Arthropoda
- Clade: Pancrustacea
- Class: Insecta
- Order: Lepidoptera
- Superfamily: Noctuoidea
- Family: Notodontidae
- Genus: Praeschausia; Benjamin, 1932
- Species: P. zapata

Binomial name
- Praeschausia zapata Schaus, 1920

Synonyms
- Kalkoma zapata Schaus, 1920

Genus of moths

Praeschausia is a monotypic moth genus of the family Notodontidae erected by Foster Hendrickson Benjamin in 1932. Its only species, Praeschausia zapata, was first described by William Schaus in 1920. It is found in Mexico.
