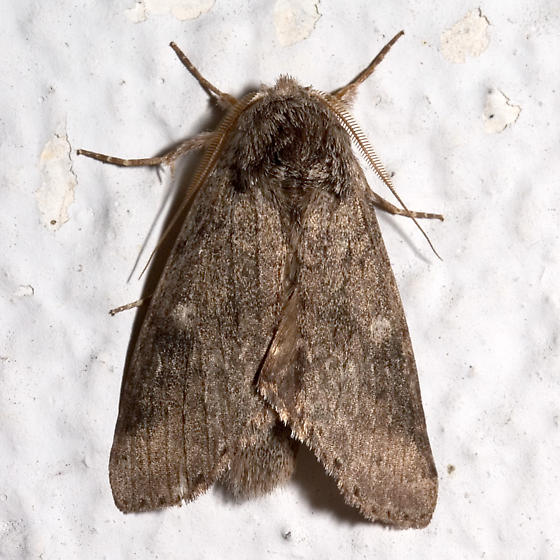

Scientific classification
- Kingdom: Animalia
- Phylum: Arthropoda
- Clade: Pancrustacea
- Class: Insecta
- Order: Lepidoptera
- Superfamily: Noctuoidea
- Family: Notodontidae
- Genus: Lochmaeus
- Species: L. manteo

Binomial name
- Lochmaeus manteo Doubleday, 1841

Synonyms
- Tadana cinerascens Walker, 1855; Lochmaeus subalbicans (Grote, 1864)

= Lochmaeus manteo =

Variable oakleaf caterpillar moth

Species of moth

Lochmaeus manteo, the variable oakleaf caterpillar moth, is a moth of the family Notodontidae. It is found in eastern North America.

The wingspan is 37–50 mm. Adults are on wing from April to October.

The larvae feed on various deciduous trees, especially Quercus species.
