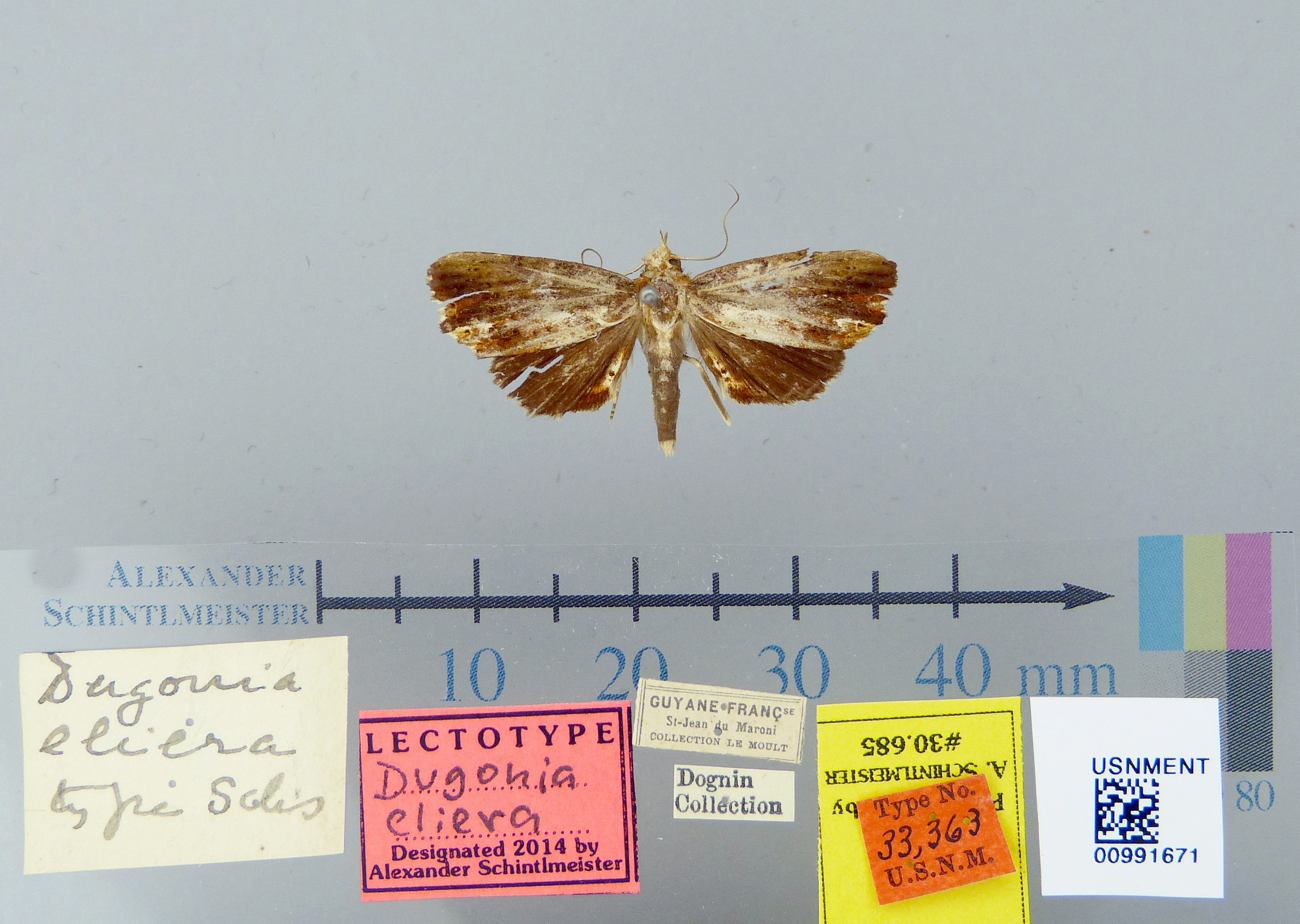
- Lectotype of Dugonia eliera, in the entomological collections of the NMNH.

Scientific classification
- Kingdom: Animalia
- Phylum: Arthropoda
- Clade: Pancrustacea
- Class: Insecta
- Order: Lepidoptera
- Superfamily: Noctuoidea
- Family: Notodontidae
- Genus: Dugonia; Schaus, 1928
- Species: D. eliera

Binomial name
- Dugonia eliera Schaus, 1928

= Dugonia =

Genus of moth

Dugonia is a monotypic genus of moths in the family Notodontidae, containing only the species Dugonia eliera. The genus and species were both first described in 1928 by William Schaus from an unspecified number of female specimens from the Dognin collection. It is known from French Guiana, with a type locality in Saint-Laurent-du-Maroni.

== Appearance ==
The following description is based on the original description by William Schaus:

Female specimens have a wingspan of 30 mm. Their forewings are long and narrow and the hindwings have straight upper edges with rounded anterior corners and a slightly obtuse outer margin. Both fore- and hindwings are brown with partially-white cilia. The forewings are marked with a double row of small black spots on the outer half of the wing, a white spot and streak, traces of white crescents near the veins, and mottled orange on the hind margin. The hindwings are mostly brown with some orange and white mottling near the hind margin, with brown spots on the mottling. The underside of both wings is brown.
