= Somera viriviri =

Scientific classification
- Domain: Eukaryota
- Kingdom: Animalia
- Phylum: Arthropoda
- Class: Insecta
- Order: Lepidoptera
- Superfamily: Noctuoidea
- Family: Notodontidae
- Genus: Somera
- Species: S. viriviri

Binomial name
- Somera viriviri Kobayashi, 2012

Species of moth

Somera viriviri is a moth of the family Notodontidae that is endemic to Sulawesi.
