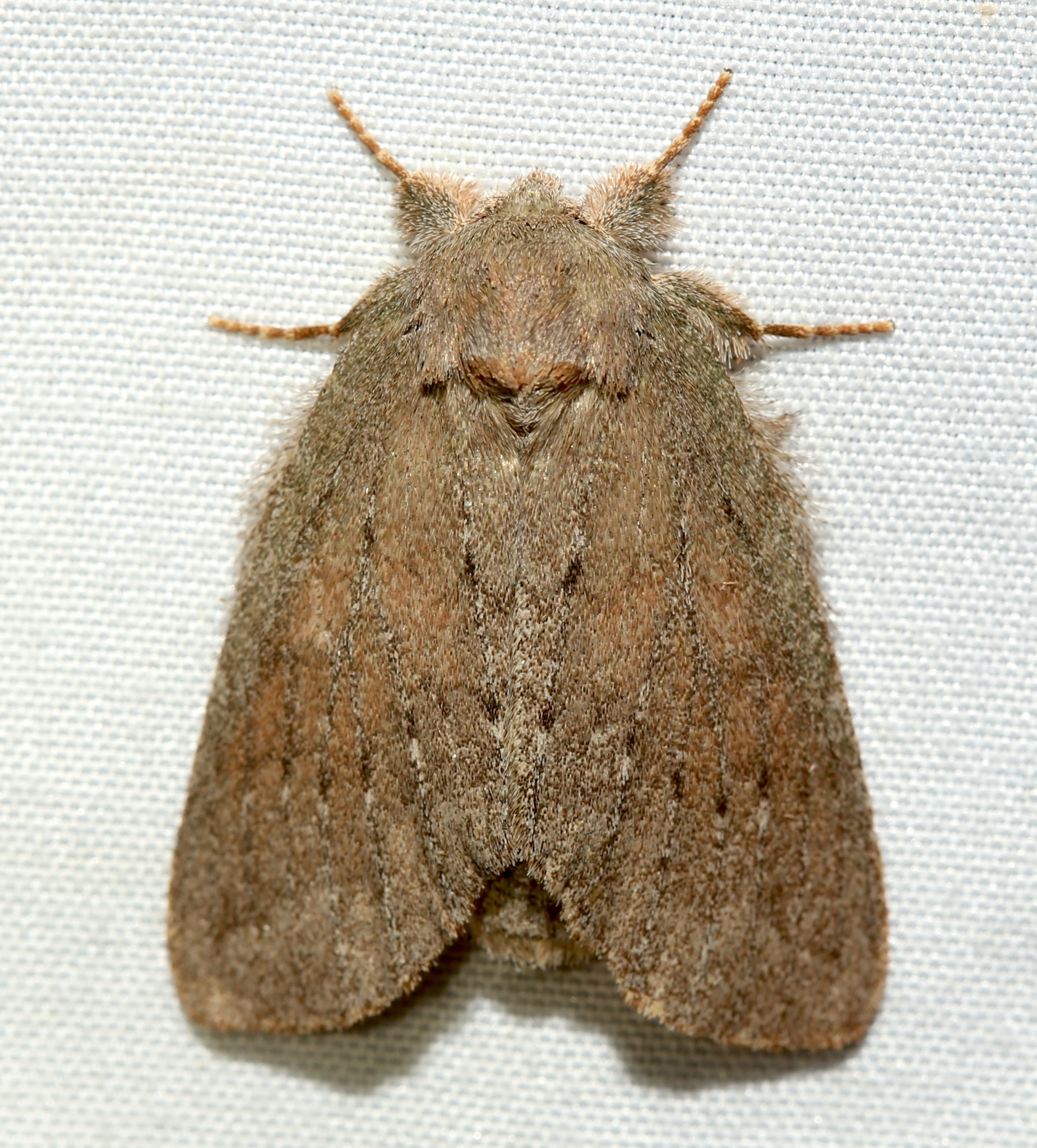
- Adult
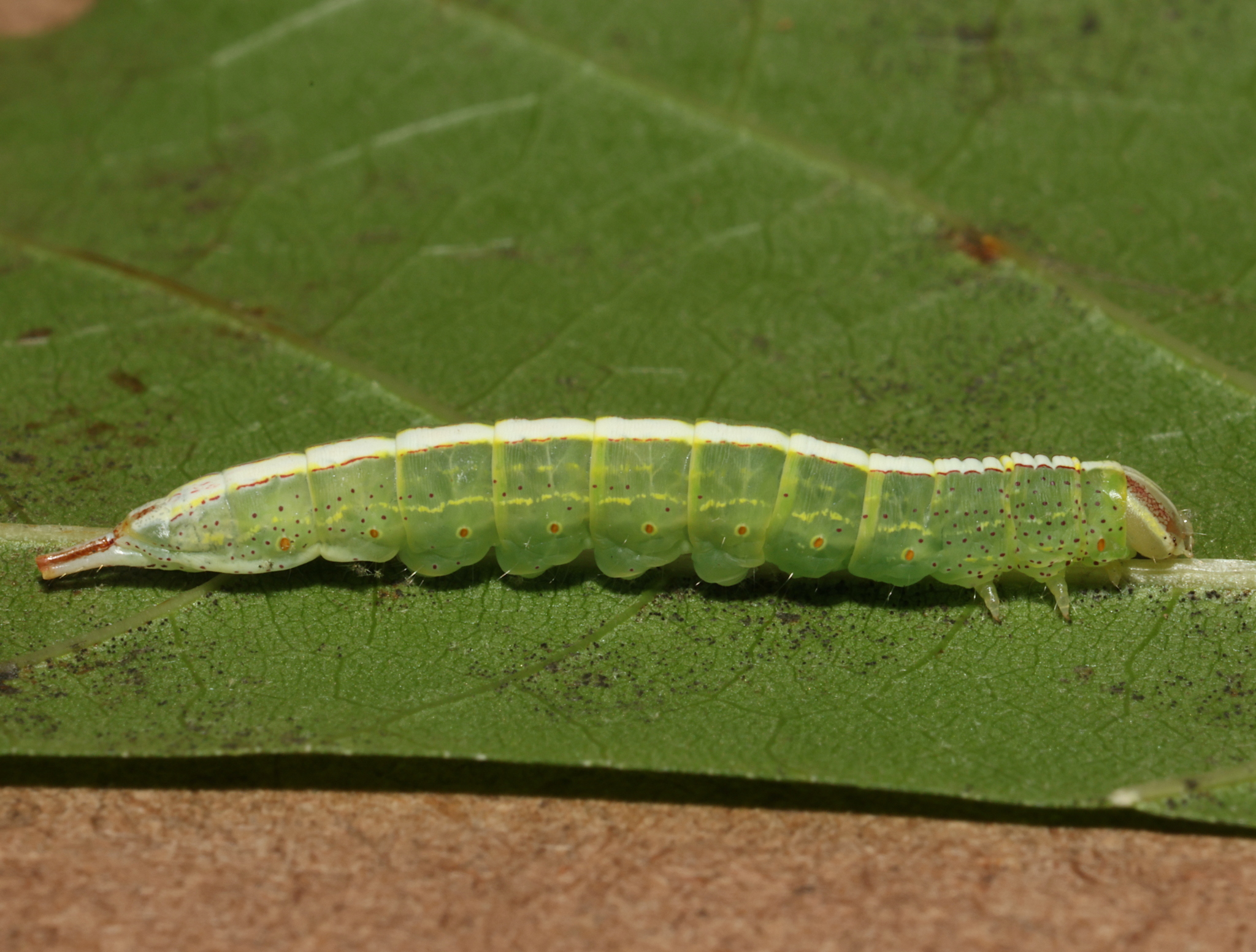
- Larva

Scientific classification
- Kingdom: Animalia
- Phylum: Arthropoda
- Clade: Pancrustacea
- Class: Insecta
- Order: Lepidoptera
- Superfamily: Noctuoidea
- Family: Notodontidae
- Genus: Misogada; Walker, 1865
- Species: M. unicolor

Binomial name
- Misogada unicolor (Packard, 1864)

Synonyms
- Lochmaeus unicolor Packard, 1864; Lochmaeus marina Packard, 1864; Misogada sobria Walker, 1865

= Misogada =

Genus of moths

Misogada is a monotypic moth genus of the family Notodontidae erected by Francis Walker in 1865. Its only species, Misogada unicolor, the drab prominent, was first described by Alpheus Spring Packard in 1864. It is found in North America from Nova Scotia to Florida, west to Texas and north to Saskatchewan.

The wingspan is about 45 mm. There are two to three generations per year.

The larvae feed on Populus sect. Aigeiros and Platanus species.
