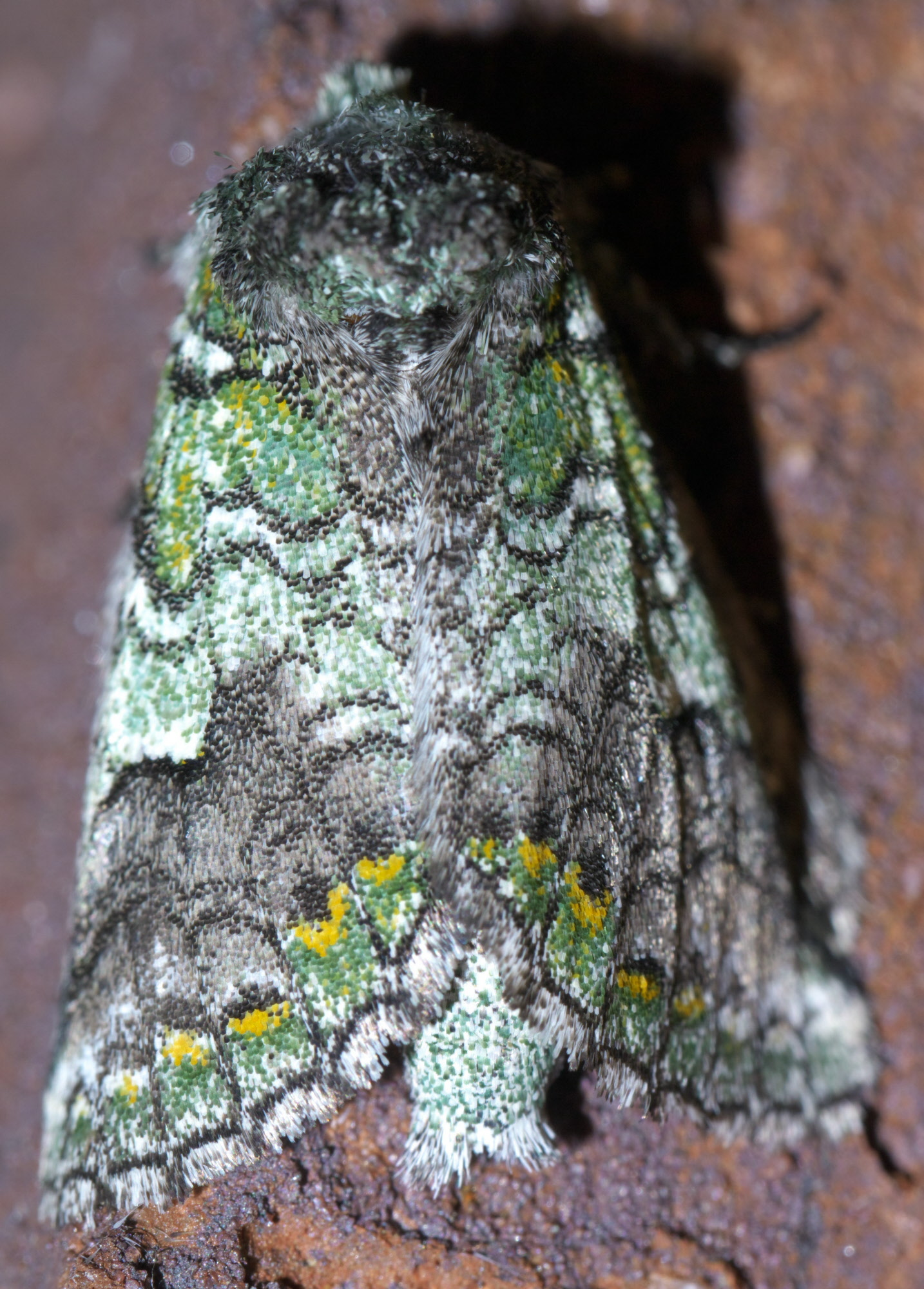
- Litodonta hydromeli, Harvey's prominent moth, Oklahoma

Scientific classification
- Kingdom: Animalia
- Phylum: Arthropoda
- Clade: Pancrustacea
- Class: Insecta
- Order: Lepidoptera
- Superfamily: Noctuoidea
- Family: Notodontidae
- Subfamily: Heterocampinae
- Genus: Litodonta; Harvey, 1876

= Litodonta =

Genus of moths

Litodonta is a genus of moths of the family Notodontidae erected by Leon F. Harvey in 1876.

== Species ==
- Litodonta contrasta Barnes & McDunnough, 1910
- Litodonta hydromeli Harvey, 1876 (Harvey's prominent moth)
- Litodonta troubridgei Miller & Wagner, 2021
