= Heterocampinae =

- Rosema cf. deolis

Scientific classification
- Kingdom: Animalia
- Phylum: Arthropoda
- Clade: Pancrustacea
- Class: Insecta
- Order: Lepidoptera
- Superfamily: Noctuoidea
- Family: Notodontidae
- Subfamily: Heterocampinae; Neumögen and Dyar, 1894

Genera
- See text

Subfamily of moths

Heterocampinae is a subfamily of prominent moths in the family Notodontidae. There are at least 60 described species of Heterocampinae in North America.

== Genera ==
- Afilia Schaus, 1901
- Disphragis Hübner, 1820
- Dugonia Schaus, 1928
- Euhyparpax Beutenmüller, 1893
- Heterocampa Doubleday, 1841
- Hyparpax Hübner, 1825
- Litodonta Harvey, 1876
- Lochmaeus Doubleday, 1841
- Macrurocampa Dyar, 1893
- Misogada Walker, 1865
- Oligocentria Herrich-Schäffer, 1855
- Praeschausia Benjamin, 1932
- Pseudhapigia Schaus, 1901
- Rifargia Walker, 1862
- Scevesia Dyar, 1916
- Schizura Doubleday, 1841
- Tecmessa Burmeister, 1878
- Theroa Schaus, 1901
- Ursia Barnes & McDunnough, 1911
