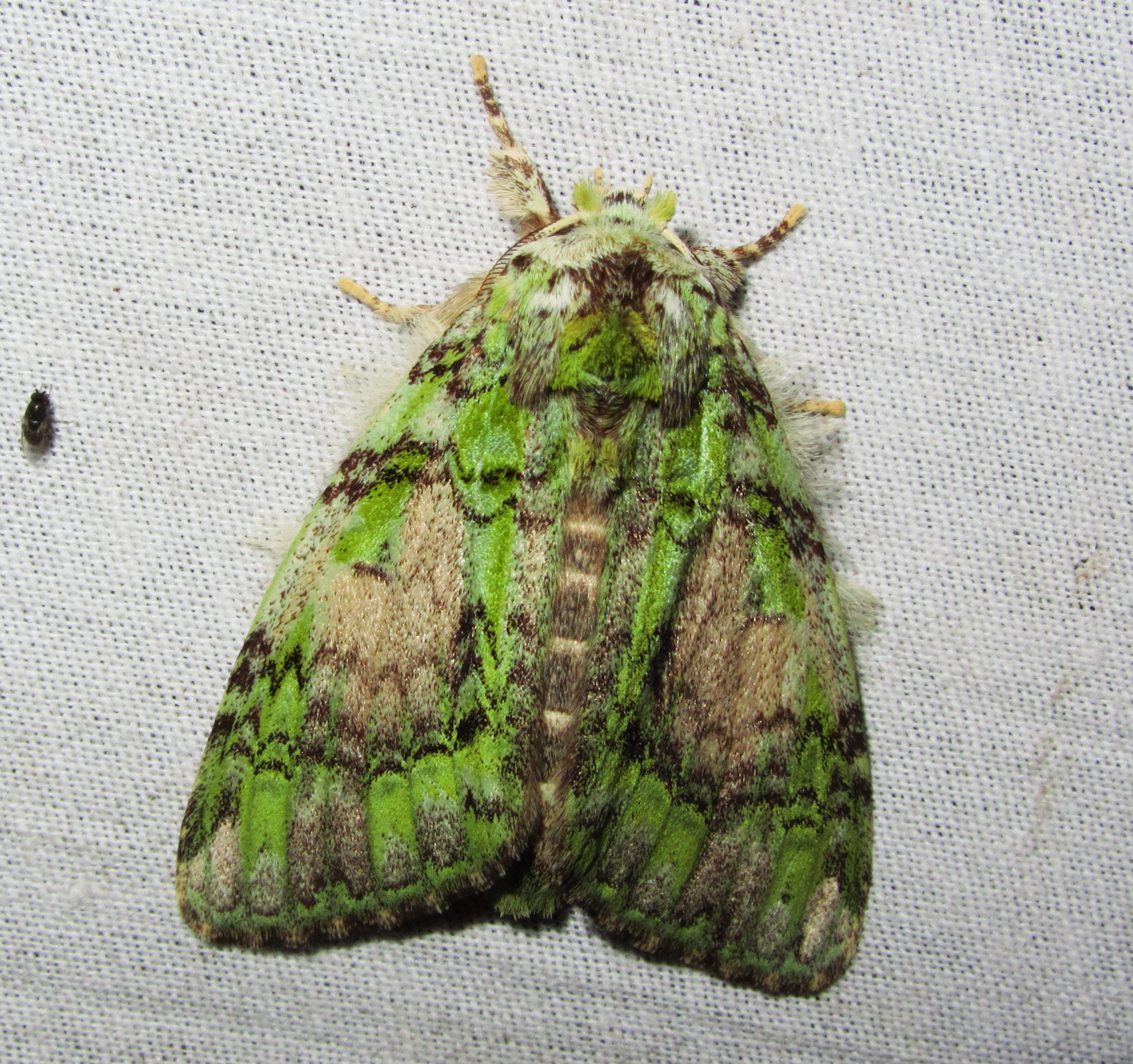

Scientific classification
- Kingdom: Animalia
- Phylum: Arthropoda
- Class: Insecta
- Order: Lepidoptera
- Superfamily: Noctuoidea
- Family: Notodontidae
- Genus: Somera
- Species: S. viridifusca

Binomial name
- Somera viridifusca Walker, 1855

= Somera viridifusca =

Prominent moth

Species of moth

Somera viridifusca, the prominent moth, is a moth of the family Notodontidae described by Francis Walker in 1855. It is found in Sri Lanka, Sundaland, the Philippines, Sulawesi, the north-eastern Himalayas, Sikkim in India, Hainan and Yunnan in China and in Taiwan.

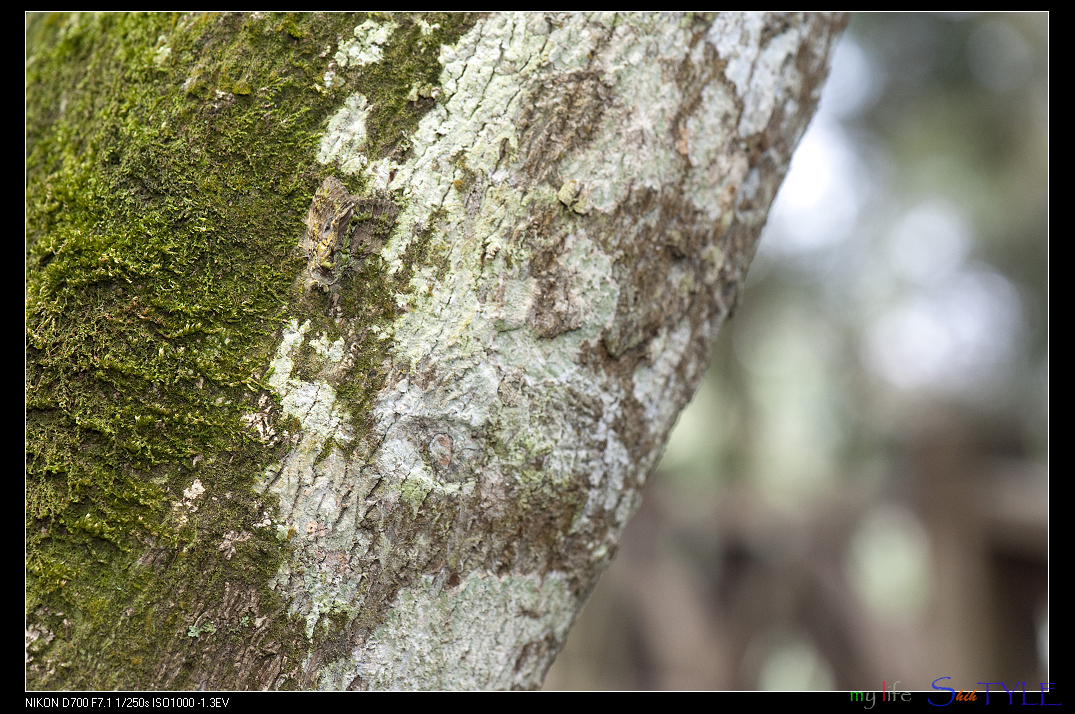
Camouflage

== Description ==
Males have brown pedipalps, greenish head and thorax vertices and a fuscous abdomen, with a greenish extremity. The forewings are bright green with a brown patch below and beyond the end of the cell (absent in some specimens), with two subbasal waved dark lines, two antemedial and four postmedial streaks and a single submarginal streak has brownish blotches. The hindwings are fuscous.
