= Mimesis (biology) =

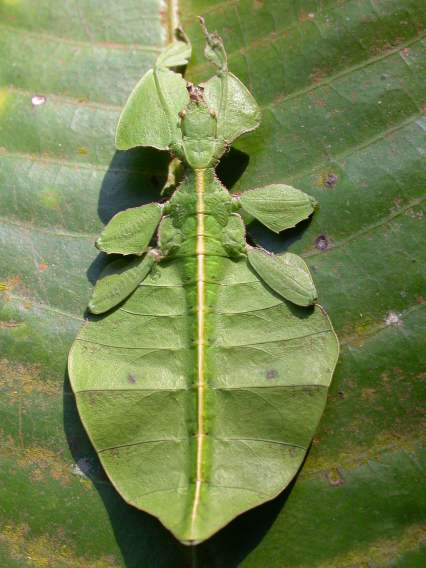
The walking leaf insects (Phylliidae) from the Indo-Pacific region resemble tree leaves in appearance and posture.

In biology, mimesis (from ancient Greek μίμησις mímēsis, "imitation") is a form of crypsis where living creatures mimic the form, colour and posture of their surroundings to avoid being noticed by predators depending on sight. One view is that mimesis, being a form of crypsis, differs from mimicry, but in English, mimesis is often counted as one of several forms of mimicry.

== Zoomimesis ==
Zoomimesis is mimicry of different animals. Examples include various visitor species of ants (myrmecophily), resembling the ants in whose nests they live.

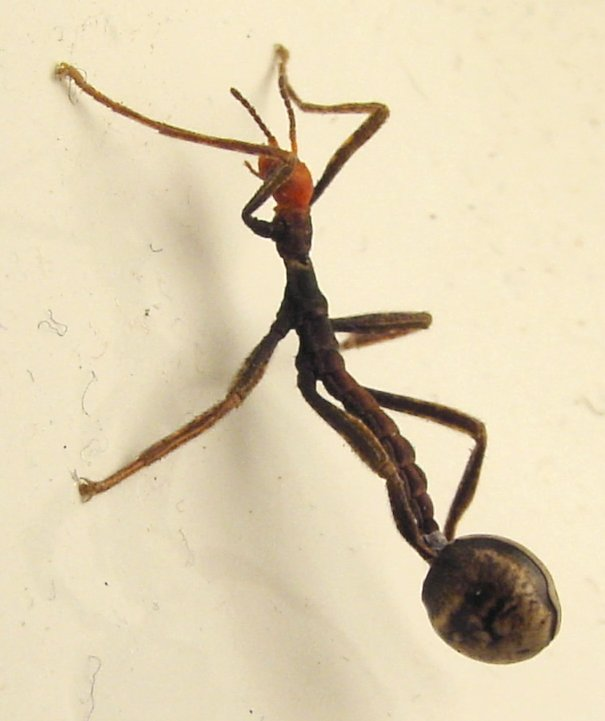
Young Extatosoma tiaratum stick insect, an ant mimic (adults are phytomimetic)

== Phytomimesis ==
Phytomimesis is mimicry of plants or parts of plants. Some geometer moths resemble thin twigs in appearance. Stick insects have a body shape resembling twigs or leaves (as in walking leaves). Notodontidae moths resemble the bark of deciduous trees. Some species in this family, such as the alder kitten and the sallow kitten moths, have cocoons resembling tree bark. Some potoo birds resemble broken branches.

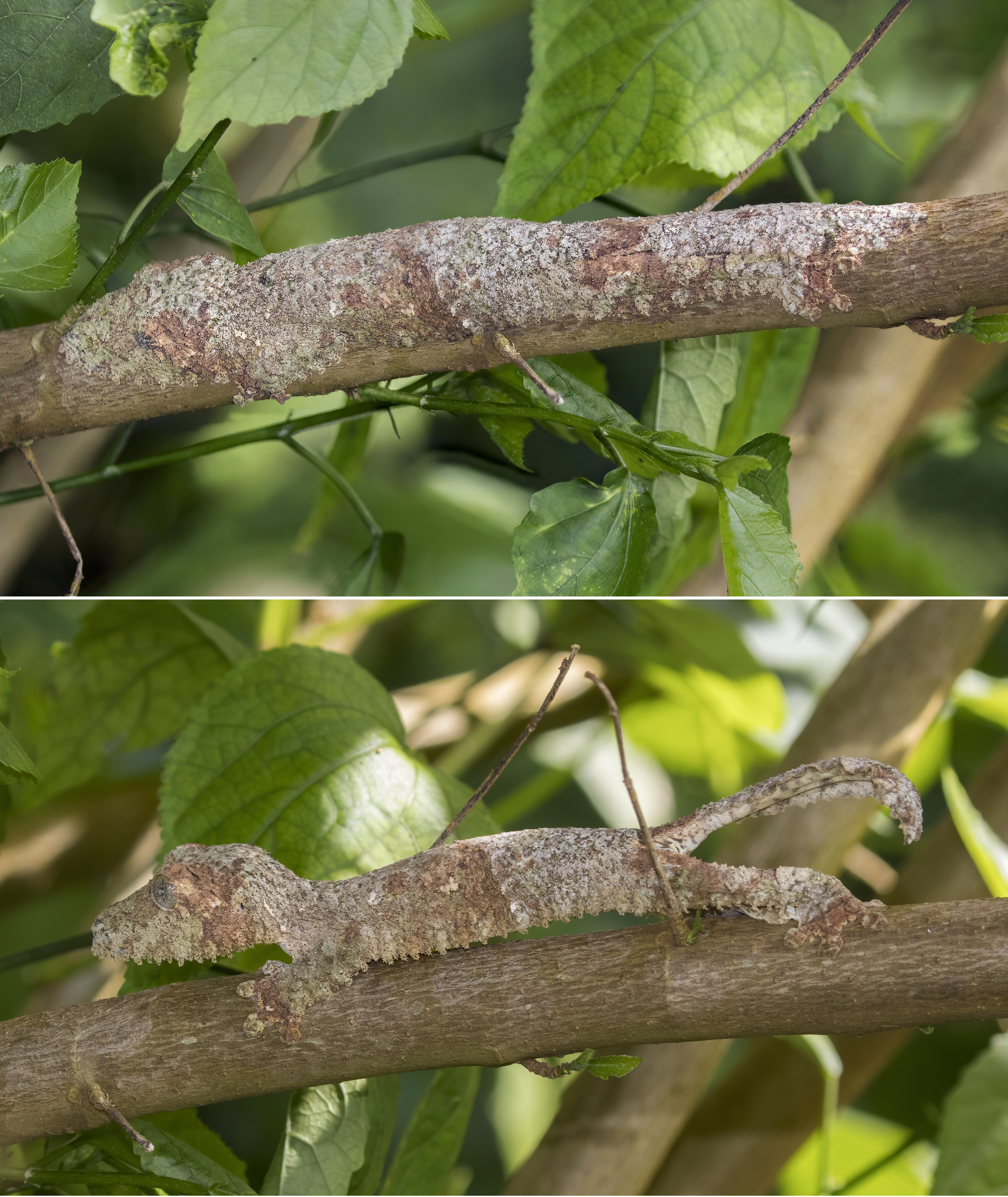
Leaf-tail gecko (Uroplatus)

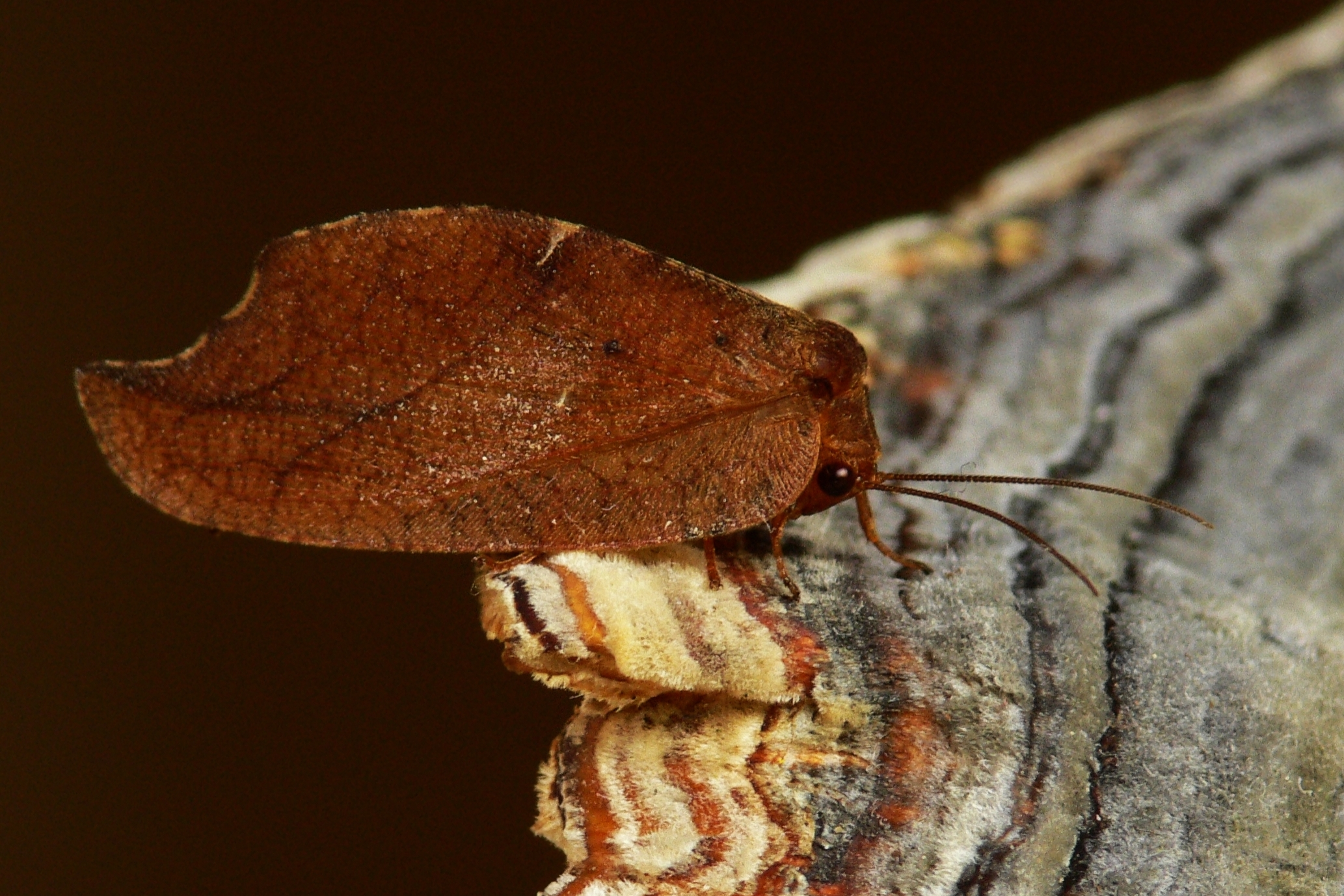
Leaf mimicry by dead leaf moth (Drepanepteryx phalaenoides)

== Allomimesis ==
Allomimesis is mimicry of lifeless objects. Some small butterflies resemble bird droppings. Some species of fig-marigolds living in African deserts resemble stones and are thus known as "living stones".

Allomimesis developed already 50 million years ago in micromoths, whose quivers in their larval stage resembled the forest soil. Evidence of this has been preserved in Baltic amber.

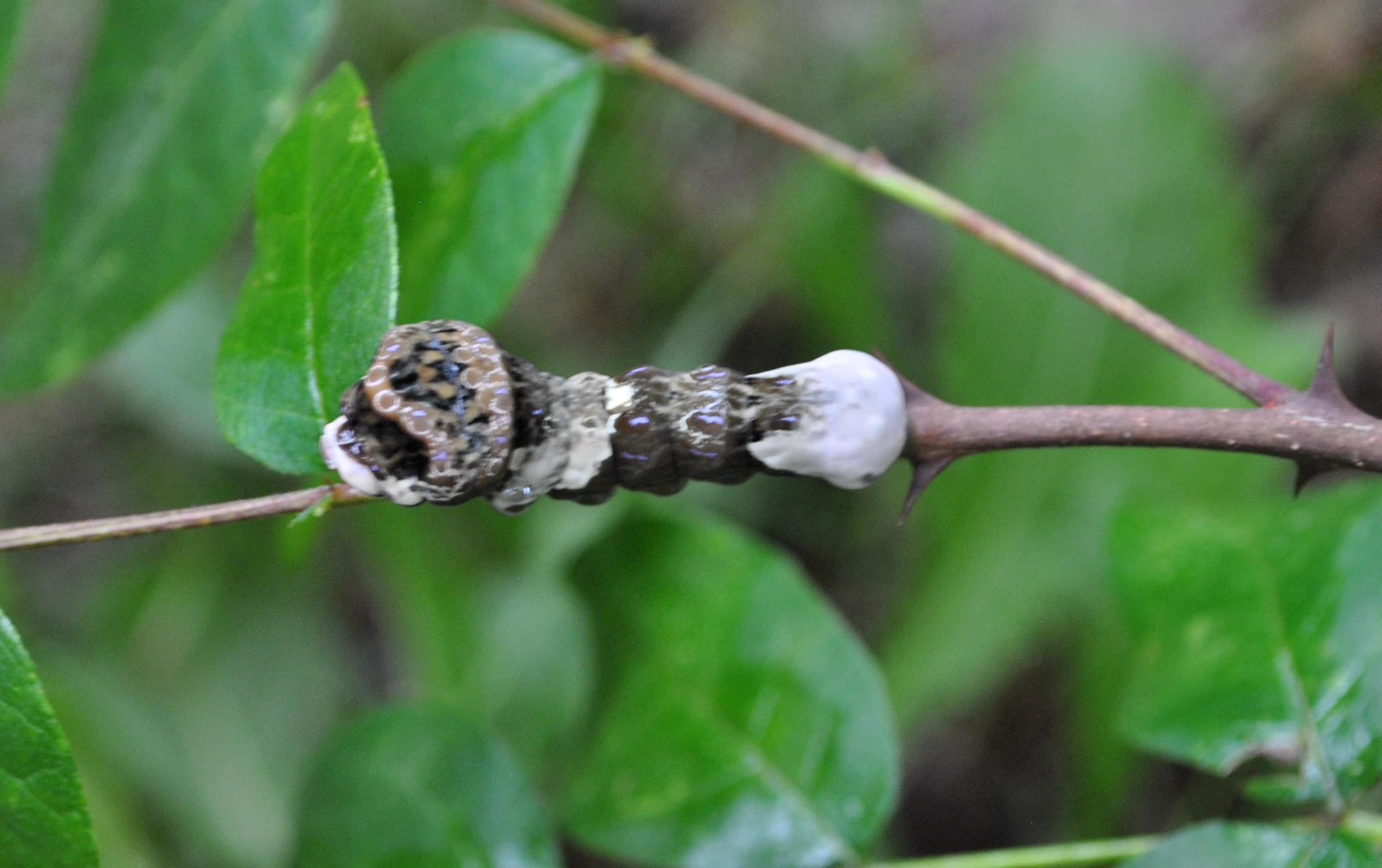
Bird droppings: larvae of the swallowtail butterfly Papilio cresphontes

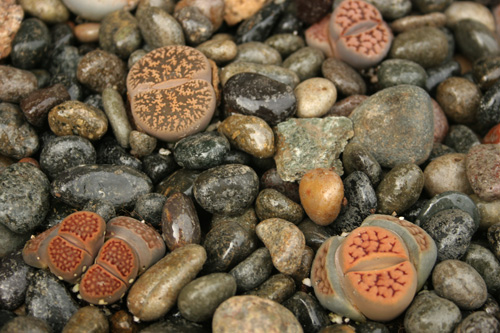
"Living stones" (Lithops)

== See also ==
- Adaptive Coloration in Animals
