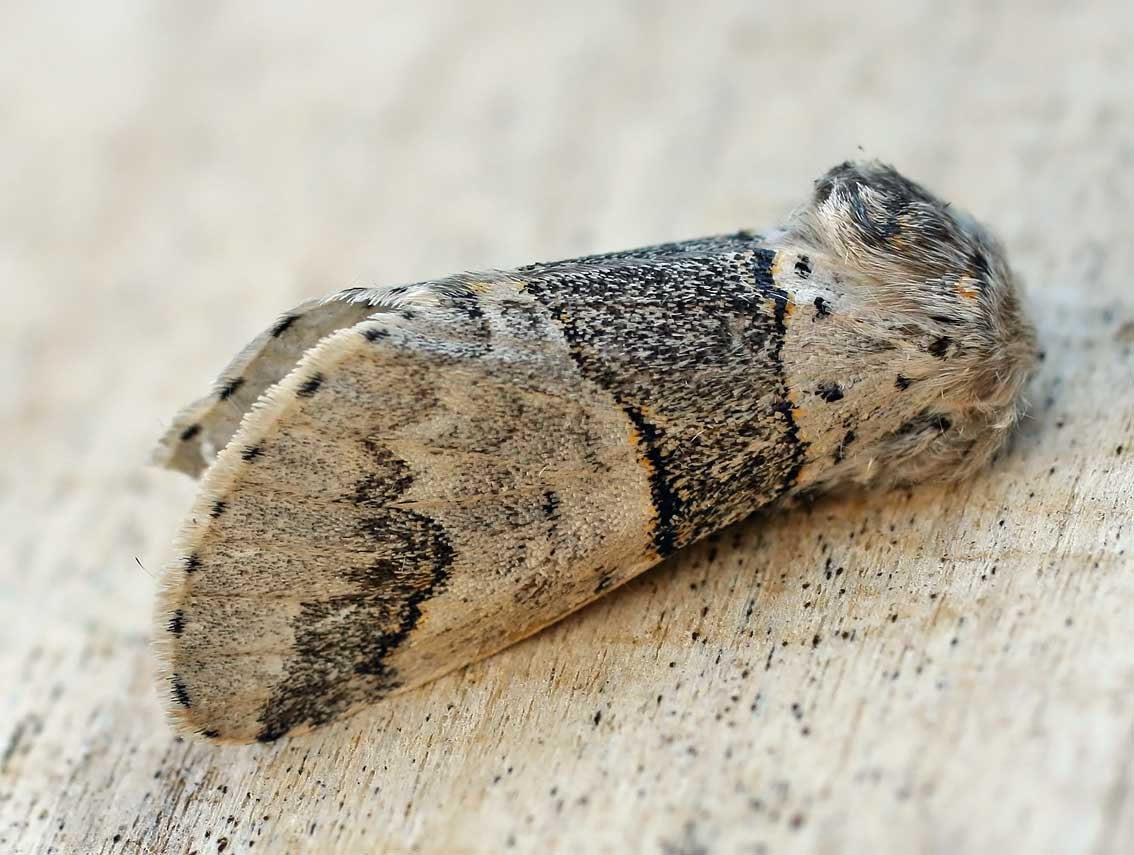

Scientific classification
- Domain: Eukaryota
- Kingdom: Animalia
- Phylum: Arthropoda
- Class: Insecta
- Order: Lepidoptera
- Superfamily: Noctuoidea
- Family: Notodontidae
- Genus: Furcula
- Species: F. bifida

Binomial name
- Furcula bifida (Brahm, 1787)

Synonyms
- Furcula hermelina (Goeze, 1781 nec Goeze, 1781); Furcula urocera (Boisduval, 1840); Furcula saltensis (Schöyen, 1881); Furcula latifascia Kirby, 1892; Furcula poecila Stichel, 1912; Furcula lype Seifers, 1933; Furcula suffusa Rangnow, 1935; Furcula septentrionalis Rangnow, 1935

= Poplar kitten =

Species of moth

The poplar kitten (Furcula bifida) is a species of moth in the family Notodontidae. The species was first described by Nikolaus Joseph Brahm in 1787. They are found throughout Europe and in North Africa, Mongolia, Kazakhstan and Xinjiang.

== Description ==
The forewings are grey, with a broad, dark grey central band and a cloud of the same colour towards the tips of the wings. The band is inwardly margined by an almost straight black line, and outwardly by a curved line; the third line is double, and curved towards the costa, forming the inner edge of the grey cloud, the lower part is wavy. The first black line is inwardly, and the second outwardly edged with ochreous, and preceding the first is a series of black dots. The hindwings are also white with brown dots along the margin. The wingspan is 44–48 mm. It differs from Furcula furcula in its generally larger size, but more especially in the shape of the black line forming the outer margin of the central band; this forms a clean curve whereas, in the alder kitten it is always more or less angled or dentate towards the front margin of the wings. Seitz - sharper black edges to the median band, which bears an evenly incurved shallow sinus on the distal side to below vein 2; of the exterior dentate lines usually only 2 are well developed. As in the case of furcula, a northern Scandinavian-Laponian race is distinguished by its dark smoky ground-colour, saltensis Schoyen. — In Southern France and Spain the species is likewise represented by a special race, urocera . Bdv., in which the markings are leas developed, or some even entirely obsolete, especially in the marginal area.- — fuscinula Steph., arcuata Steph., integra Steph. and latifascia Curt., which were described from England, are hardly different from true bifida. — Egg black. Larva similar to that of furcula, with similar dark red-brown dorsal spots; first stage blackish, later ones yellowish green with sparse red lateral dots; the large triangular thoracical patch divided by a narrow pale median line and irregularly variegated with light spots, as well as edged with reddish yellow. The dorsal abdominal spots extend to the anal segment. End of July to September on species of Populus, especially Aspen. Pupa pale brown, in a dark brown cocoon. Moth early in June.

== Biology ==
It flies at night from May to July and is attracted to light, the male more so than the female. The larva is like a small version of the bizarre-looking larva of the puss moth, with the last pair of prolegs modified into two long "tails". It feeds on poplar and aspen, and occasionally on willow.

The species overwinters as a pupa in a cocoon on the trunk of its food plant.

== Subspecies ==
- F. b. bifida (Brahm, 1787)
- F. b. lype (Seiffers, 1933)
- F. b. urocera Boisduval, 1840

== Gallery ==
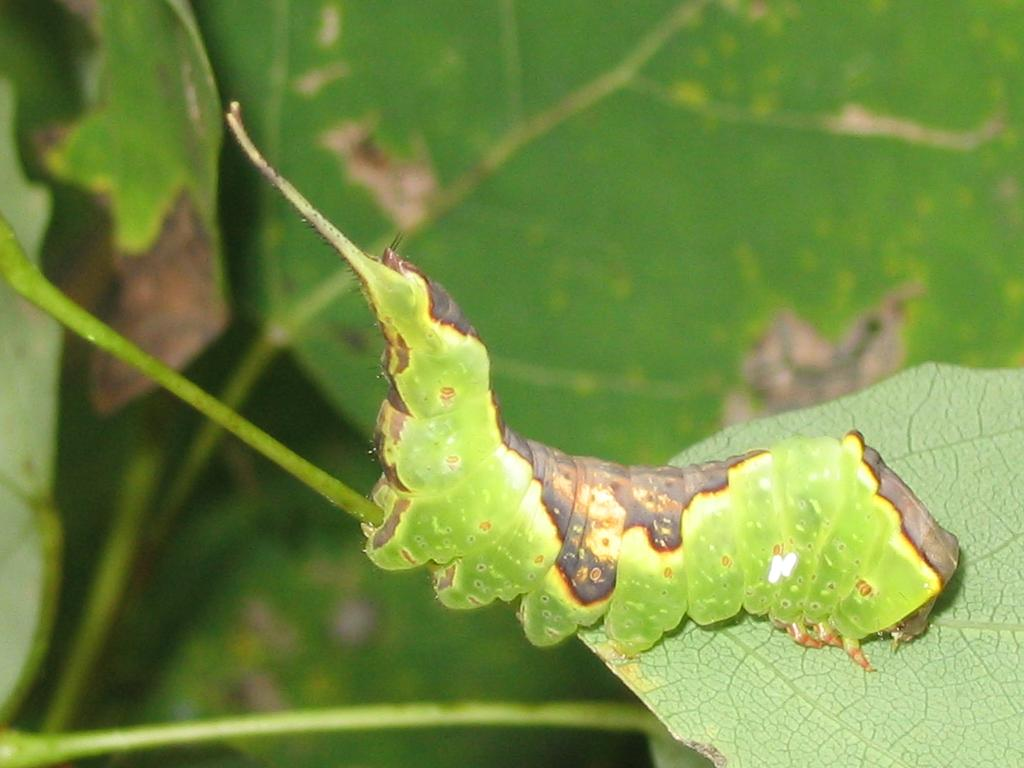
Caterpillar

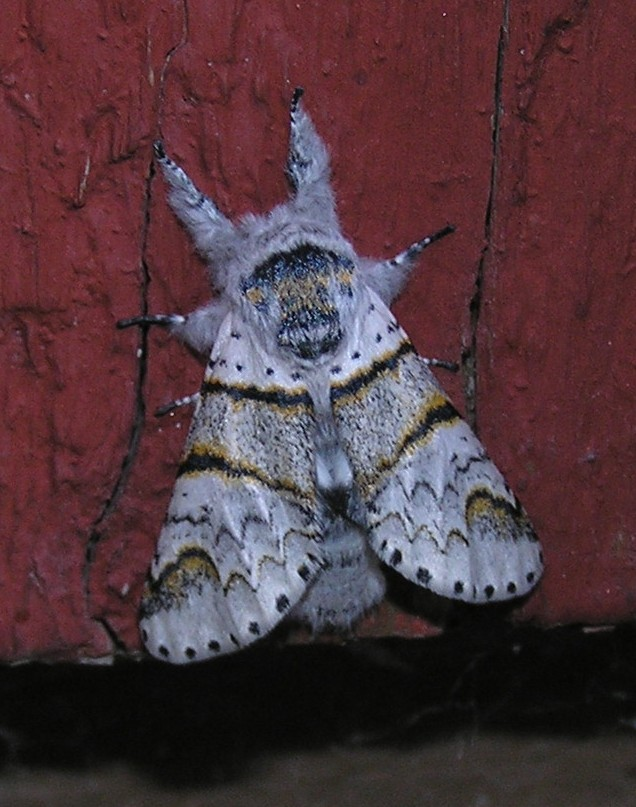
Dorsal view

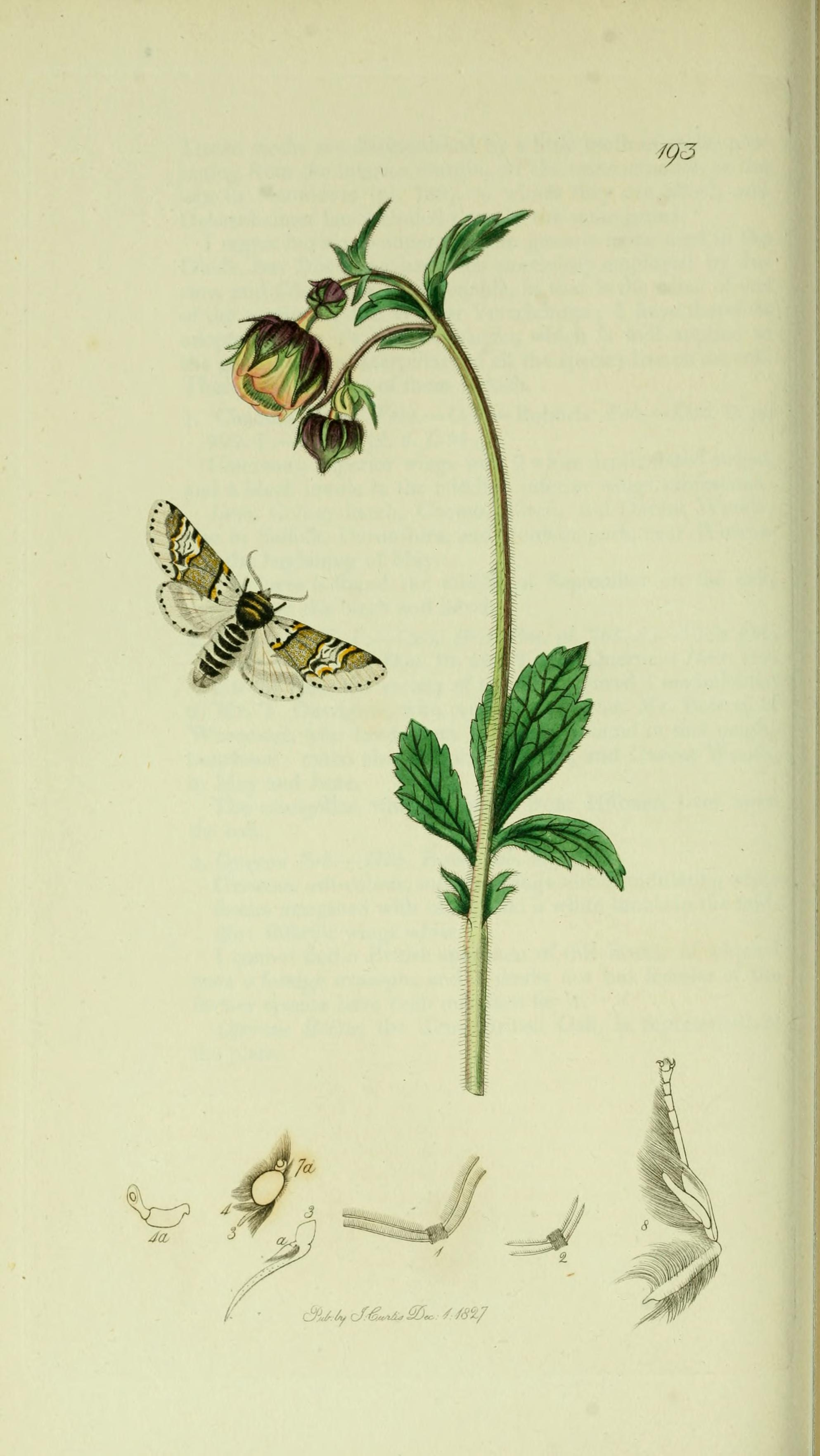
Illustration from John Curtis's British Entomology

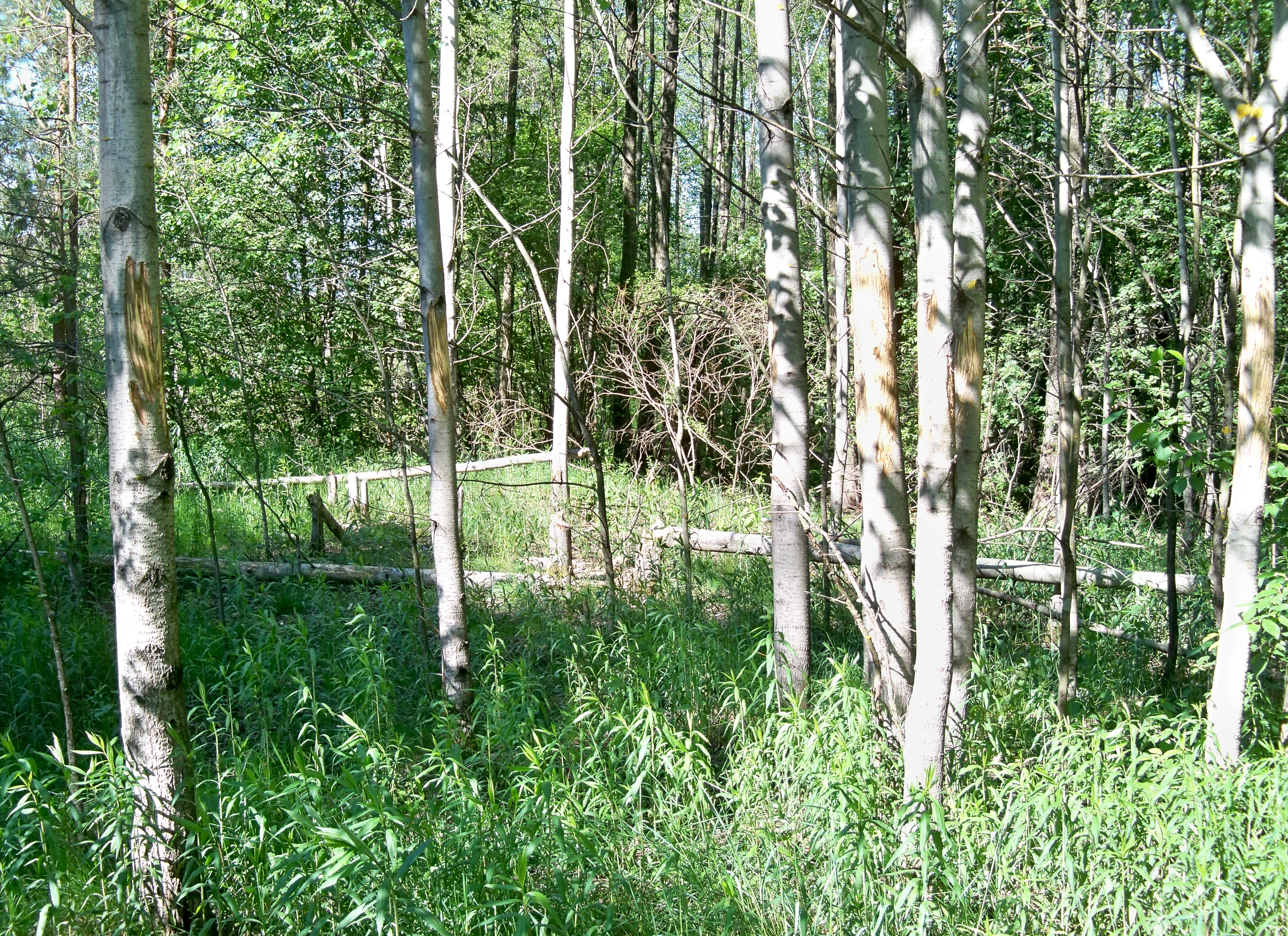
Habitat

== Notes ==
1. The flight season refers to the British Isles. This may vary in other parts of the range.
