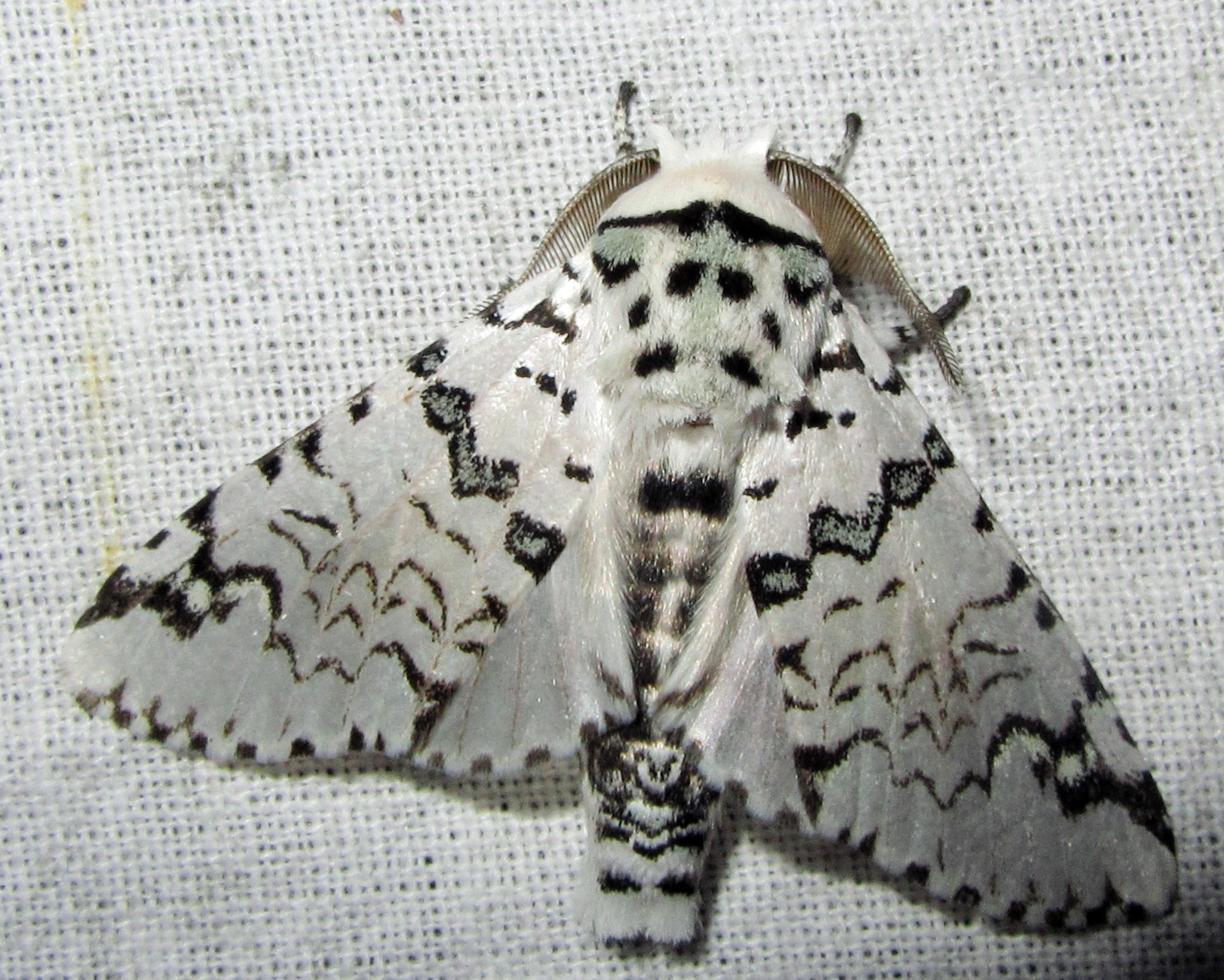

Scientific classification
- Kingdom: Animalia
- Phylum: Arthropoda
- Class: Insecta
- Order: Lepidoptera
- Superfamily: Noctuoidea
- Family: Notodontidae
- Genus: Cerura
- Species: C. liturata

Binomial name
- Cerura liturata (Walker, 1855)

Synonyms
- Cerura arikana Matsumura, 1927; Gerura liturata Walker, 1855; Neocerura liturata Kiriakoff, 1968

= Cerura liturata =

Species of moth

Cerura liturata is a moth of the family Notodontidae described by Francis Walker in 1855. It is found from the Oriental tropics of India, Sri Lanka to Sundaland.

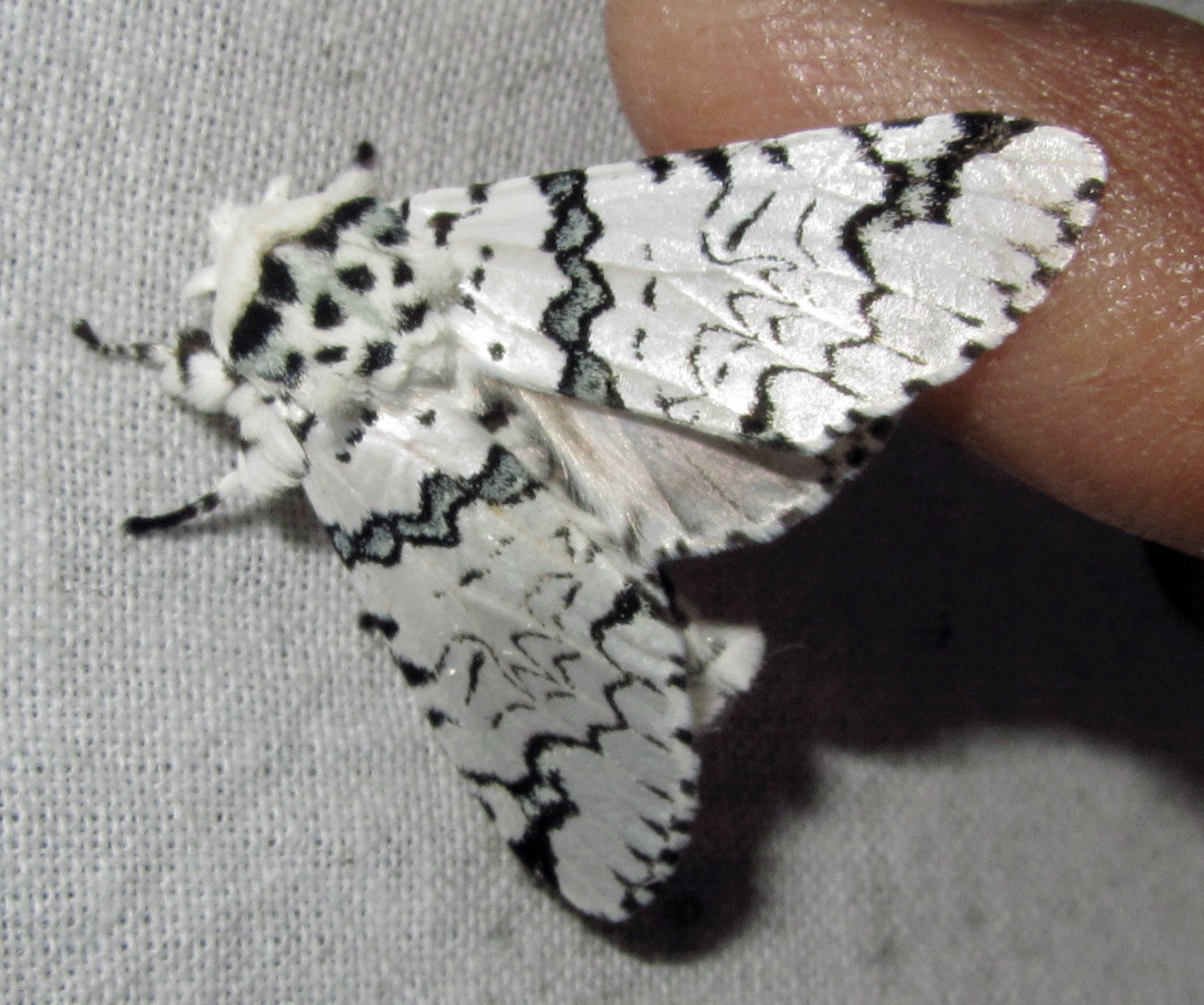

== Description ==
It is a pure white moth. Palpi are black. Collar and thorax spotted with black. Abdomen may be banded or completely suffused with black, leaving a white patch with a black semicircular mark on the last abdominal segment. Forewings with two waved sub-basal lines from the costa to median nervure, some black spots below the median nervure. A highly waved antemedial band, three waved postmedial lines and a waved medial line present. There is a black line on discocellulars surrounded by a black ring mark. Hindwings are more or less suffused with fuscous. There are two indistinct medial lines and a series of marginal black spots.

The larvae feed on Flacourtiaceae, Populus and Terminalia species.
