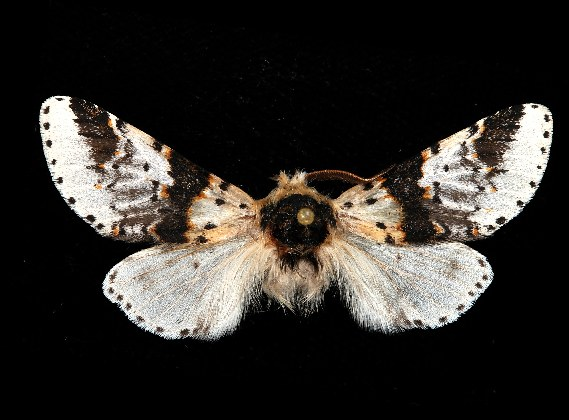

Scientific classification
- Kingdom: Animalia
- Phylum: Arthropoda
- Clade: Pancrustacea
- Class: Insecta
- Order: Lepidoptera
- Superfamily: Noctuoidea
- Family: Notodontidae
- Genus: Furcula
- Species: F. scolopendrina

Binomial name
- Furcula scolopendrina (Boisduval, 1869)

= Furcula scolopendrina =

Species of moth

Furcula scolopendrina, the zigzag furcula moth or poplar kitten moth, is a species of prominent moth in the family Notodontidae. It was described by Jean Baptiste Boisduval in 1869 and is found in North America.

The MONA or Hodges number for Furcula scolopendrina is 7940.
