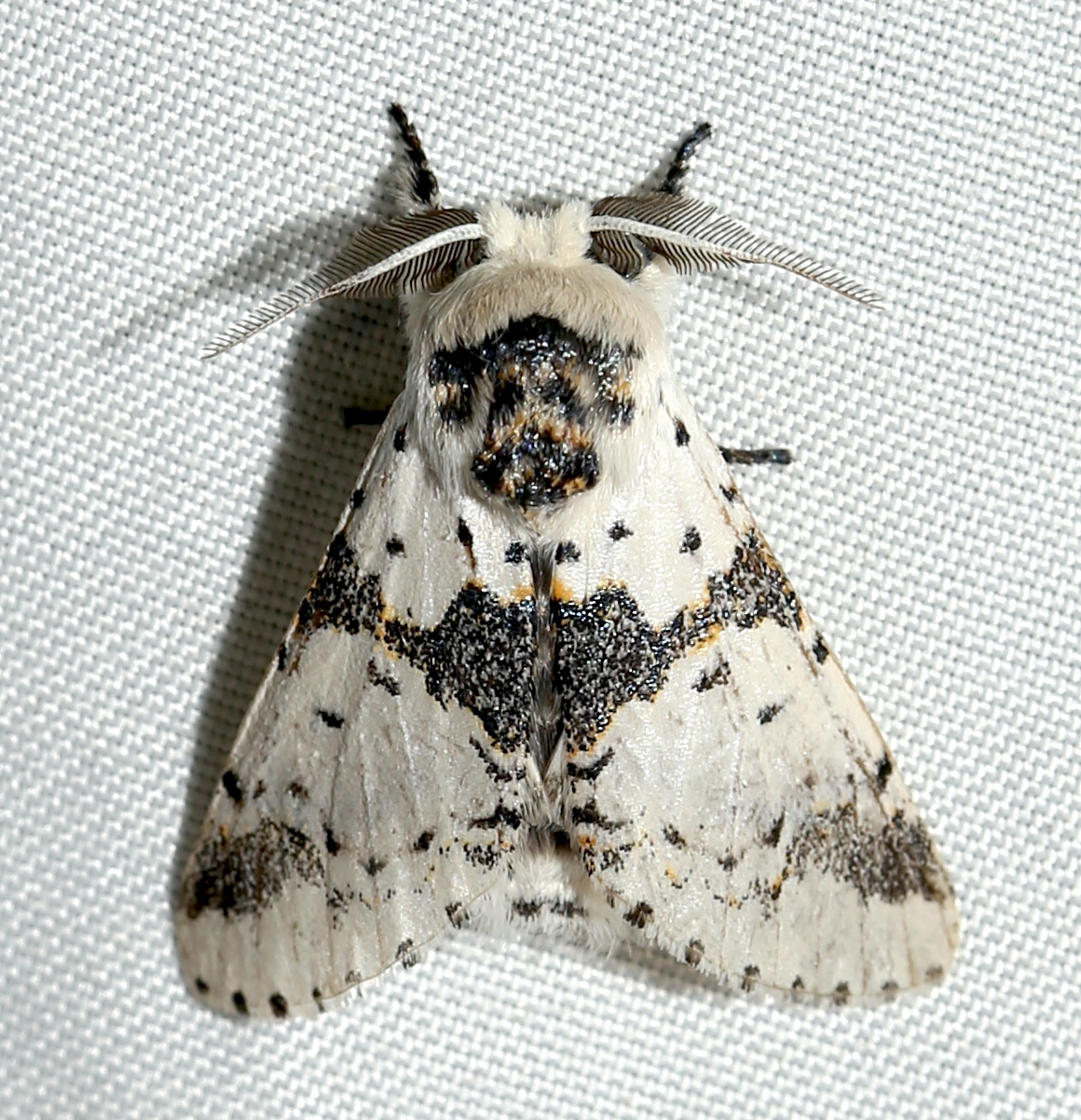
- Adult
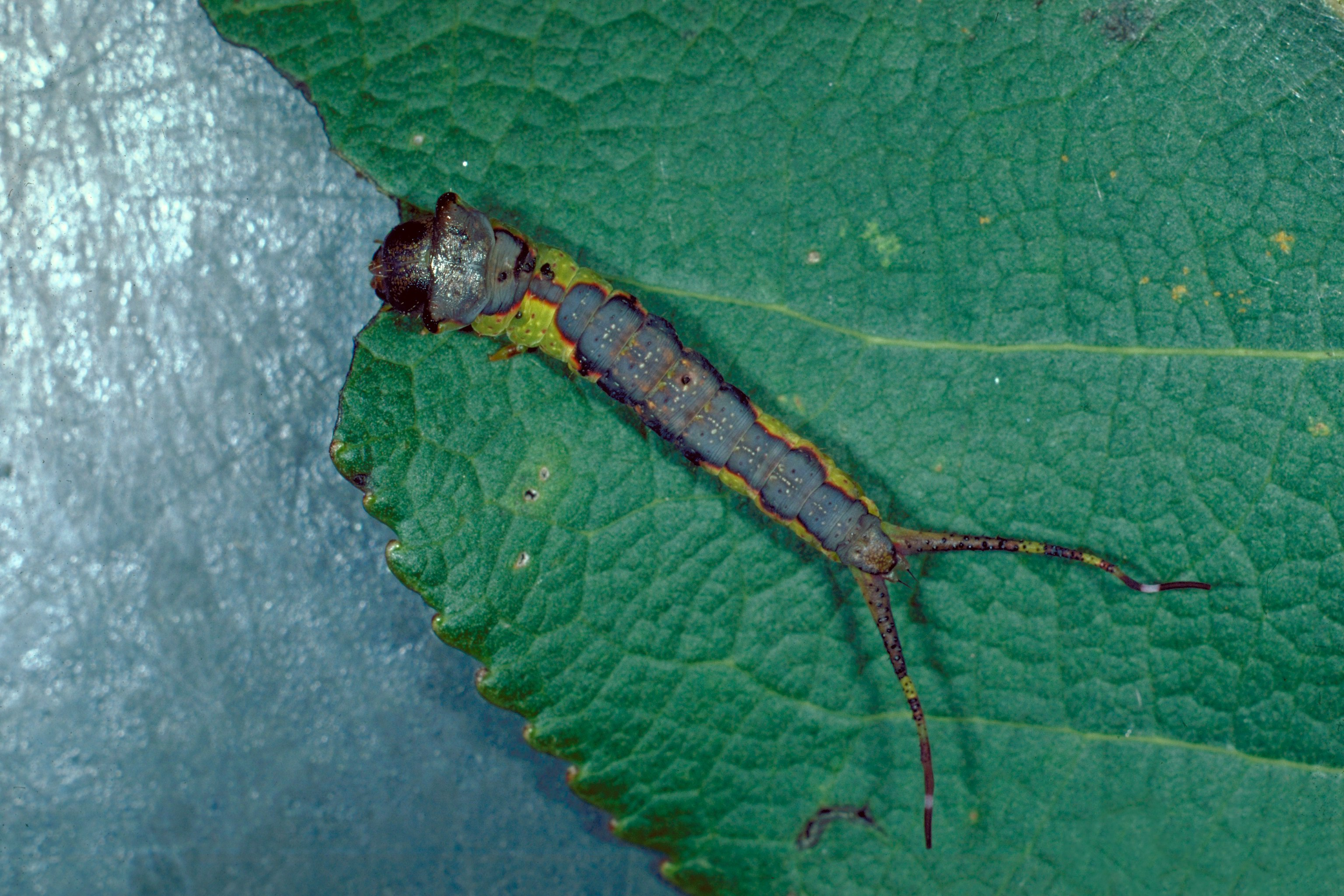
- Larva

Scientific classification
- Kingdom: Animalia
- Phylum: Arthropoda
- Clade: Pancrustacea
- Class: Insecta
- Order: Lepidoptera
- Superfamily: Noctuoidea
- Family: Notodontidae
- Genus: Furcula
- Species: F. borealis

Binomial name
- Furcula borealis (Guérin-Méneville, 1832)

Synonyms
- Dicranoura borealis Guérin-Méneville, 1832

= Furcula borealis =

White furcula moth

Species of moth

Furcula borealis, the white furcula moth, is a moth of the family Notodontidae. It is found from New Hampshire to Texas and Florida, as well as in Colorado and South Dakota.

The wingspan is 31–42 mm. Adults are on wing from April to August.

The larvae feed on Prunus avium, Salix and Populus species.
