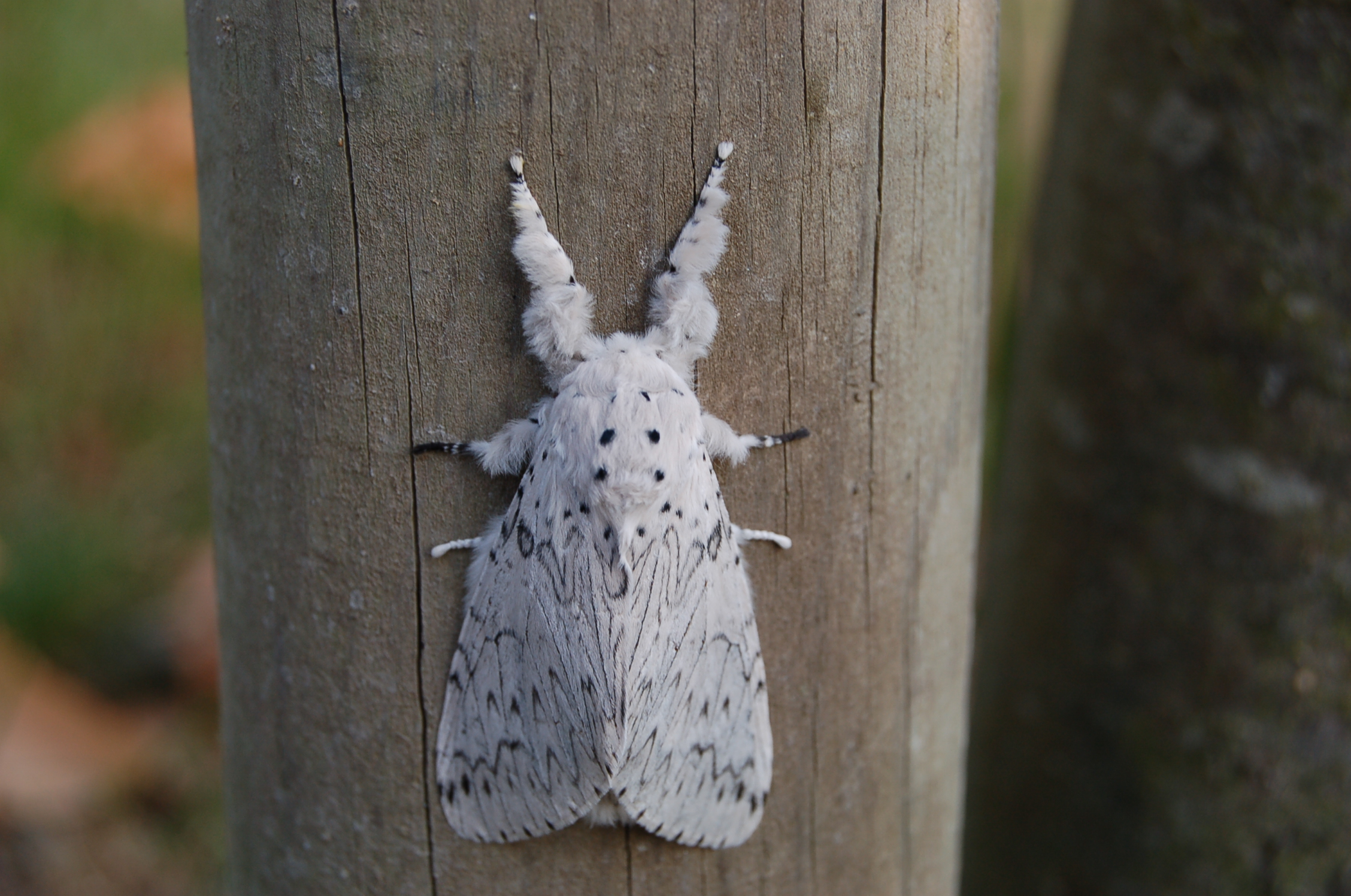
- imago
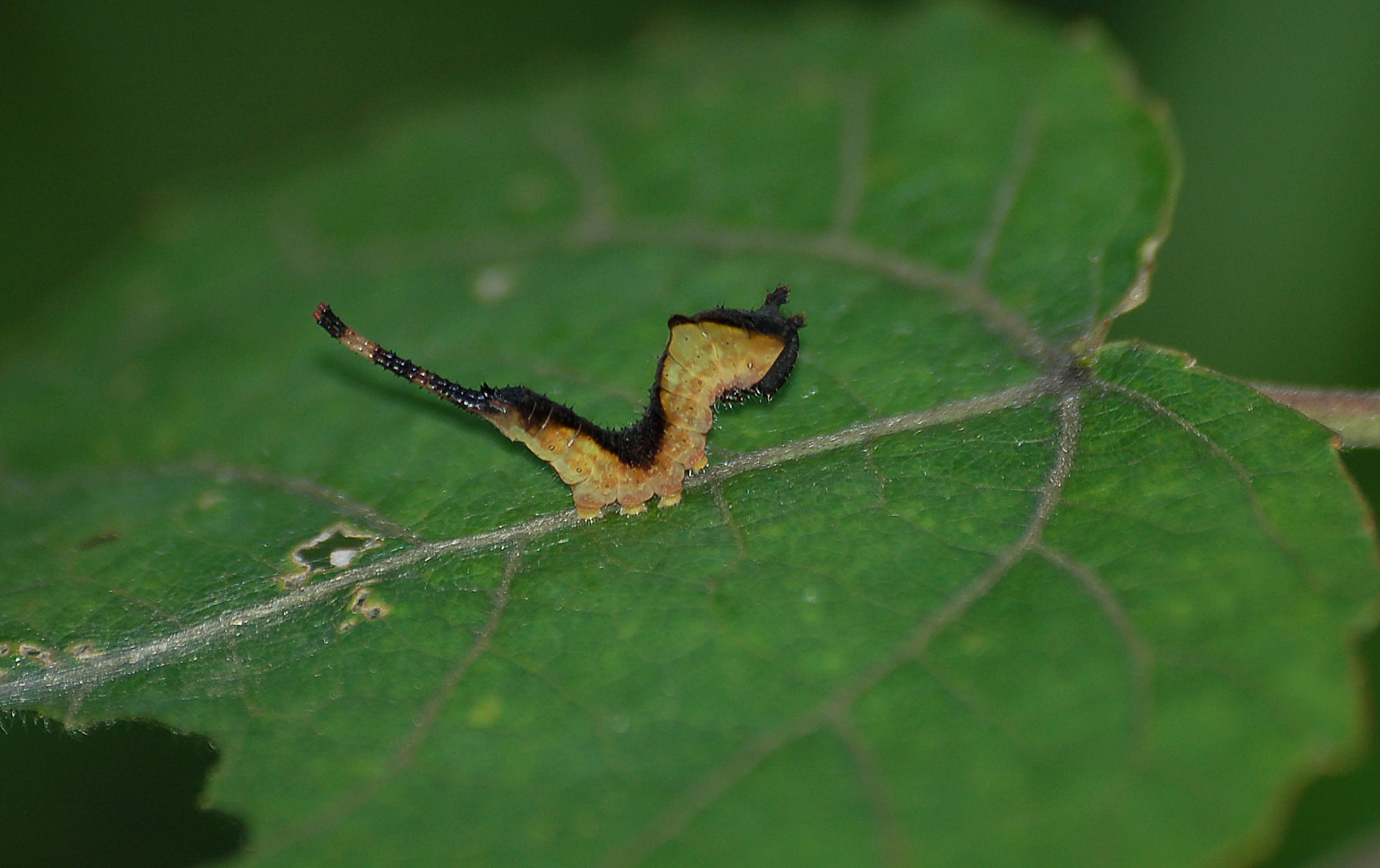
- caterpillar

Scientific classification
- Kingdom: Animalia
- Phylum: Arthropoda
- Clade: Pancrustacea
- Class: Insecta
- Order: Lepidoptera
- Superfamily: Noctuoidea
- Family: Notodontidae
- Genus: Cerura
- Species: C. erminea

Binomial name
- Cerura erminea (Esper, 1783)

= Cerura erminea =

Species of moth

Cerura erminea is a moth of the family Notodontidae, also known as the lesser puss moth or feline. It is found in Europe.

The length of the forewings is 30–38 mm for females and 25–30 mm for males. The moth flies from May to July depending on the location.

The larvae feed on willow and poplar.
