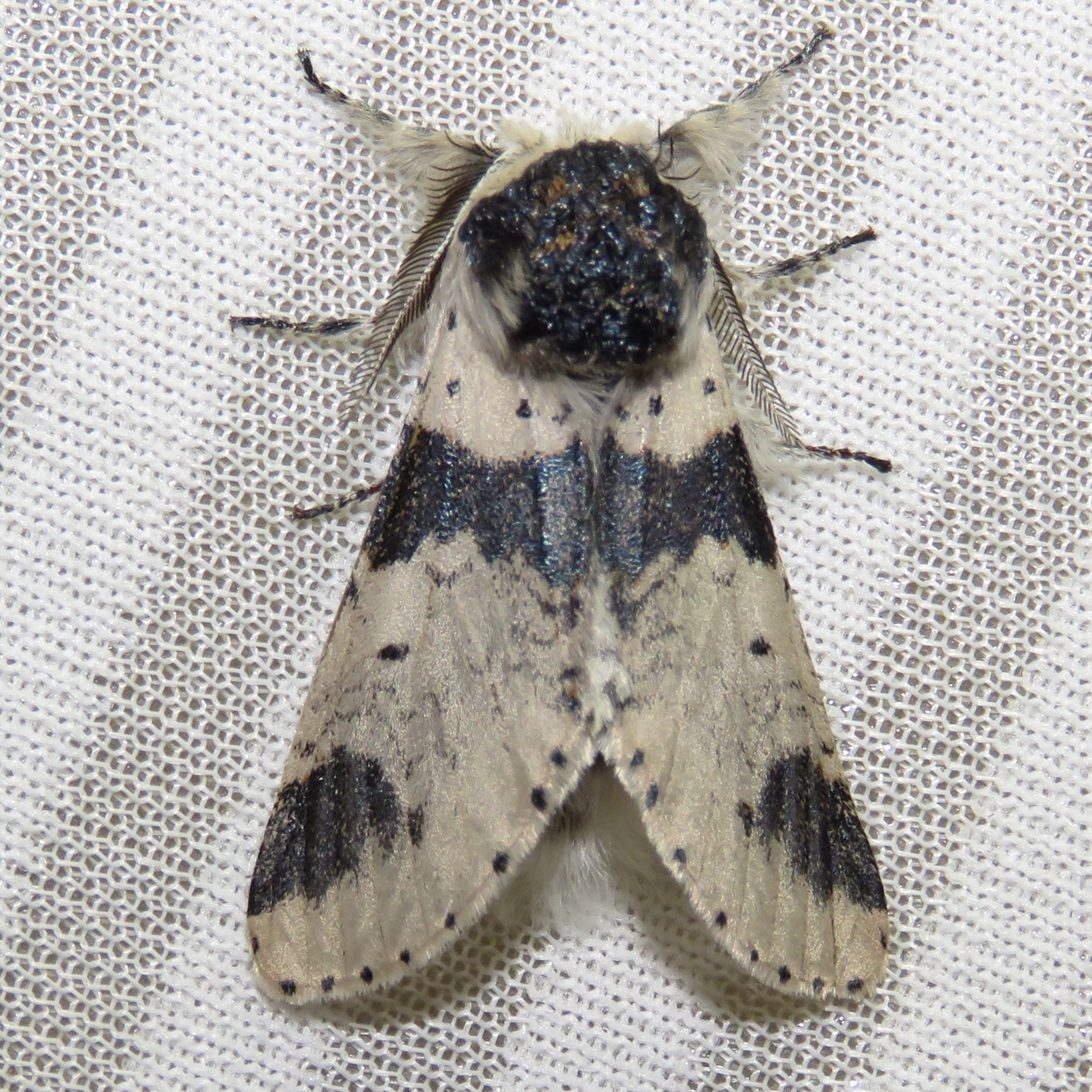

Scientific classification
- Kingdom: Animalia
- Phylum: Arthropoda
- Clade: Pancrustacea
- Class: Insecta
- Order: Lepidoptera
- Superfamily: Noctuoidea
- Family: Notodontidae
- Tribe: Dicranurini
- Genus: Furcula
- Species: F. modesta

Binomial name
- Furcula modesta (Hudson, 1891)

= Furcula modesta =

Species of moth

Furcula modesta, the modest furcula or modest kitten, is a species of moth in the family Notodontidae (the prominents). It was first described by Hudson in 1891 and it is found in North America.
