= Furcula nivea =

Scientific classification
- Kingdom: Animalia
- Phylum: Arthropoda
- Clade: Pancrustacea
- Class: Insecta
- Order: Lepidoptera
- Superfamily: Noctuoidea
- Family: Notodontidae
- Tribe: Dicranurini
- Genus: Furcula
- Species: F. nivea

Binomial name
- Furcula nivea (Neumoegen, 1891)

Species of moth

Furcula nivea is a moth in the family Notodontidae (the prominents). It was first described by Berthold Neumoegen in 1891 and it is found in North America.

The MONA or Hodges number for Furcula nivea is 7938.

== Subspecies ==
Three subspecies belong to Furcula nivea:

- Furcula nivea meridionalis Dyar, 1892^{c g}
- Furcula nivea nivea^{g}
- Furcula nivea niveata Barnes & Benjamin, 1924^{c g}

Data sources: i = ITIS, c = Catalogue of Life, g = GBIF, b = BugGuide
