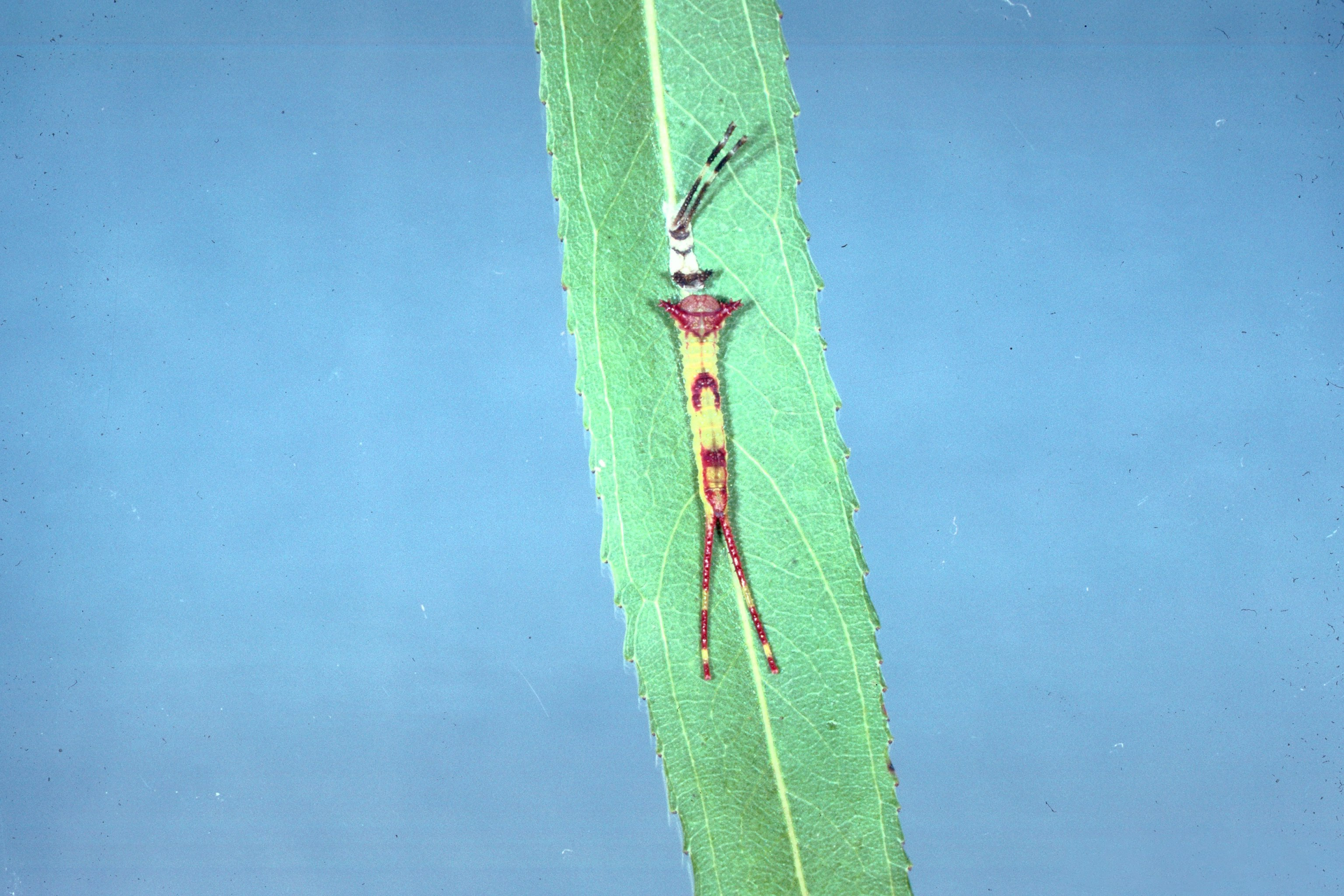

Scientific classification
- Kingdom: Animalia
- Phylum: Arthropoda
- Clade: Pancrustacea
- Class: Insecta
- Order: Lepidoptera
- Superfamily: Noctuoidea
- Family: Notodontidae
- Genus: Furcula
- Species: F. occidentalis

Binomial name
- Furcula occidentalis (Lintner, 1878)

Synonyms
- Cerura occidentalis Lintner, 1878; Cerura gigans McDunnough, 1922; Cerura decorum Dyar, 1922; Furcula occidentalis gigans

= Furcula occidentalis =

Species of moth

Furcula occidentalis, the western furcula moth, double-lined furcula or willow kitten , is a moth of the family Notodontidae. It is found from southern Yukon and British Columbia to Nova Scotia, south to Maryland and west to Utah and Oregon.

The wingspan is 32–45 mm. Adults are on wing from April to August in one to two generations per year.

The larvae feed on Salix and sometimes Populus species. Larvae can be found from June to September. The species overwinters in the pupal stage.
