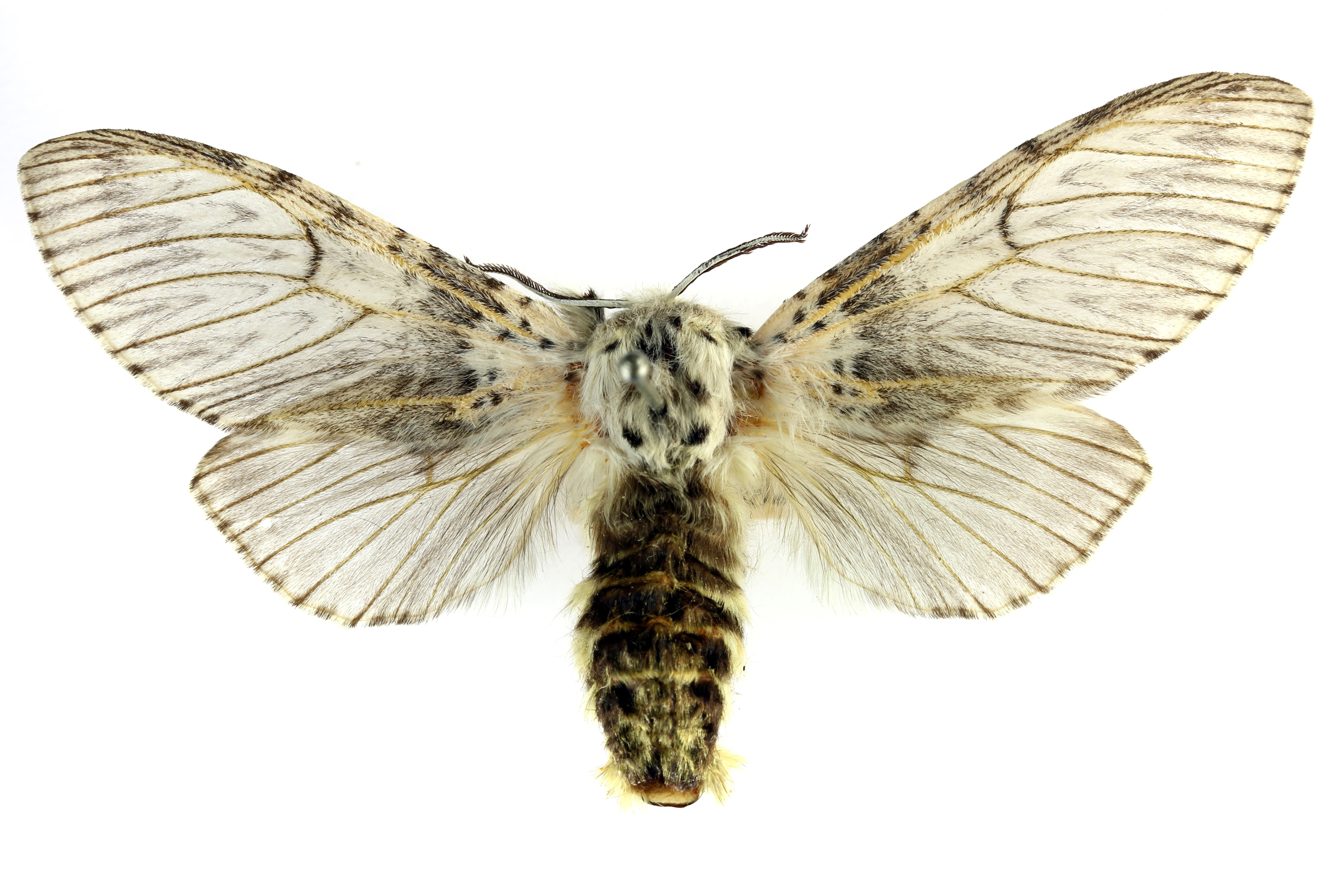
- Cerura vinula

Scientific classification
- Kingdom: Animalia
- Phylum: Arthropoda
- Clade: Pancrustacea
- Class: Insecta
- Order: Lepidoptera
- Superfamily: Noctuoidea
- Family: Notodontidae
- Tribe: Dicranurini
- Genus: Cerura; Schrank, 1802

Synonyms
- Dicranura Boisduval, 1828; Andria Hübner, 1822; Pania Dalman, 1823; Neocerura Matsumura, 1929; Apocerura Becker & Bender & de Lattin, 1974

= Cerura =

Genus of moths

Cerura is a genus of moths of the family Notodontidae described by Franz von Paula Schrank in 1802.

== Species ==
- Cerura australis Scott, 1864
- Cerura dayongi Schintlmeister & Fang, 2001
- Cerura delavoiei (Gaschet, 1876)
- Cerura erminea (Esper, 1783)
- Cerura felina Butler, 1877
- Cerura iberica (Ortiz & Templado, 1966)
- Cerura kandyia Moore
- Cerura liturata Walker, 1855
- Cerura malaysiana Holloway, 1982
- Cerura menciana Moore, 1877
- Cerura multipunctata Bethune-Baker, 1904
- Cerura priapus Schintlmeister, 1997
- Cerura przewalskyi (Alphéraky, 1882)
- Cerura subrosea (Matsumura, 1927)
- Cerura tattakana Matsumura, 1927
- Cerura thomasi Schintlmeister, 1993
- Cerura vinula (Linnaeus, 1758)
