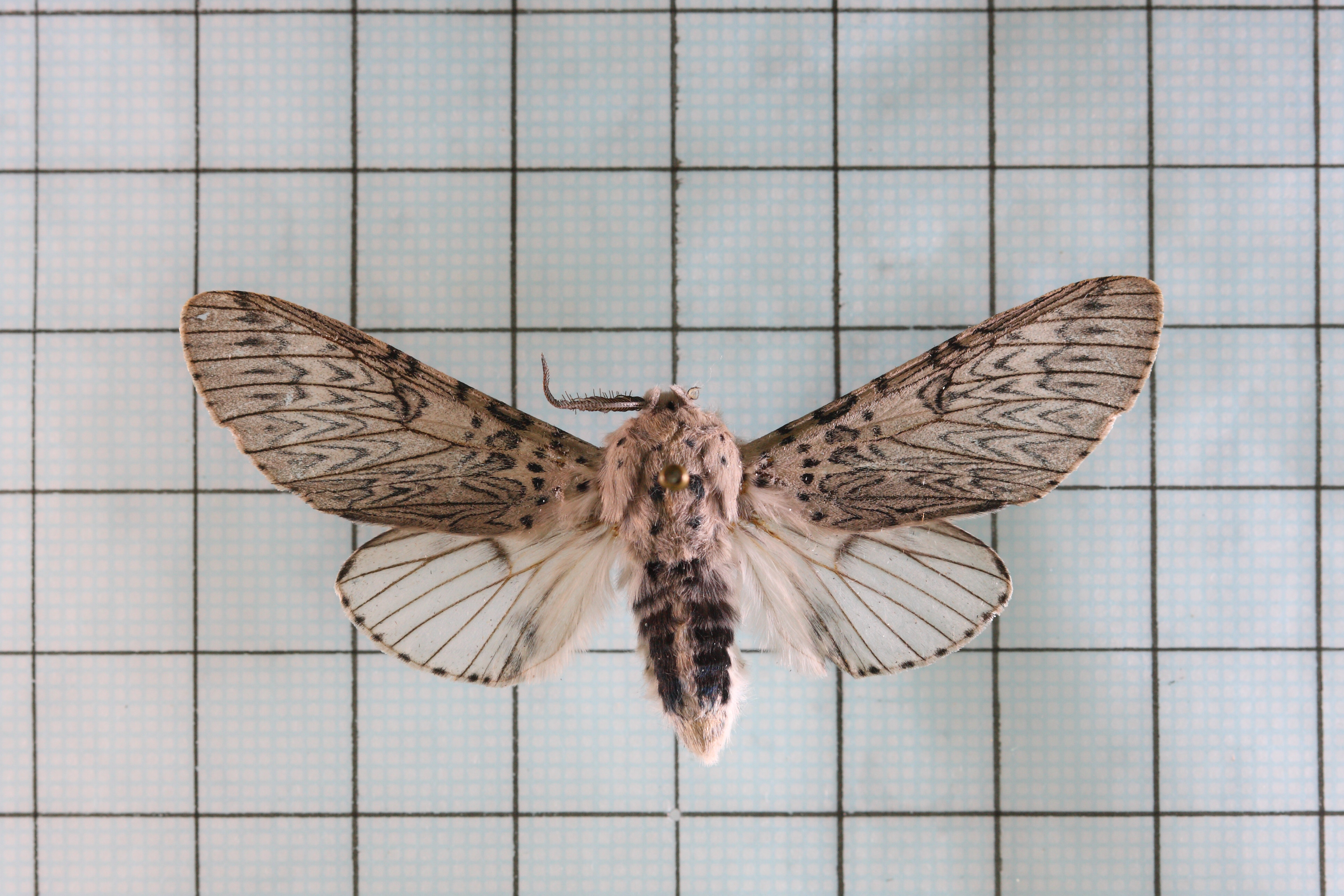
- Cerura menciana formosana

Scientific classification
- Kingdom: Animalia
- Phylum: Arthropoda
- Clade: Pancrustacea
- Class: Insecta
- Order: Lepidoptera
- Superfamily: Noctuoidea
- Family: Notodontidae
- Genus: Cerura
- Species: C. menciana

Binomial name
- Cerura menciana Moore, 1877

Synonyms
- Cerura birmanica Bryk, 1949; Cerura formosana Matsumura, 1929

= Cerura menciana =

Species of moth

Cerura menciana is a moth of the family Notodontidae. It is found in Japan, Korea, China, Burma and Taiwan.

The wingspan is 50–60 mm.

The larvae have been recorded feeding on Populus species.

== Subspecies ==
- Cerura menciana menciana (China)
- Cerura menciana birmanica Bryk, 1949 (Burma)
- Cerura menciana formosana Matsumura, 1929 (Taiwan)
