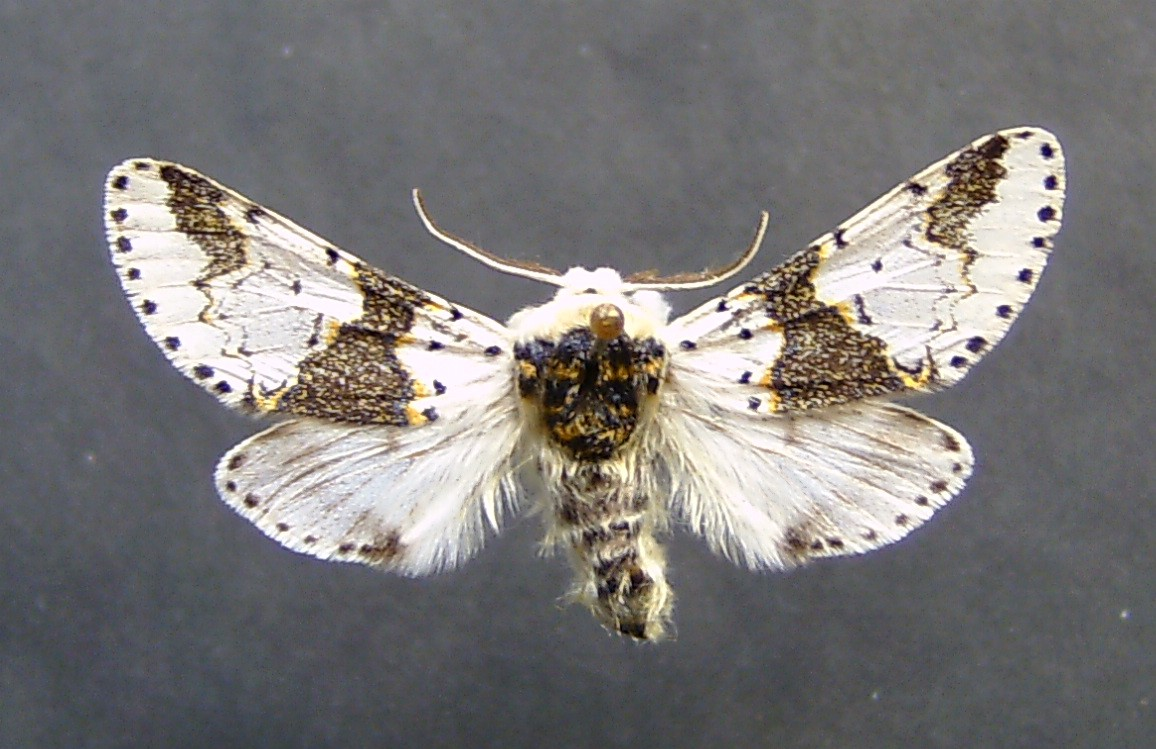
- Furcula bicuspis

Scientific classification
- Kingdom: Animalia
- Phylum: Arthropoda
- Clade: Pancrustacea
- Class: Insecta
- Order: Lepidoptera
- Superfamily: Noctuoidea
- Family: Notodontidae
- Tribe: Dicranurini
- Genus: Furcula; Lamarck, 1816

= Furcula (moth) =

Genus of moths

Furcula is a genus of moths of the family Notodontidae. The genus was described by Jean-Baptiste Lamarck in 1816.

== Species ==
- Furcula aeruginosa (Christoph, 1872)
- Furcula bicuspis (Borkhausen, 1790)
- Furcula bifida (Brahm, 1787)
- Furcula borealis (Guérin-Méneville, 1832) (was treated as a subspecies of F. bicuspis for some time)
- Furcula cinerea (Walker, 1865)
- Furcula furcula (Clerck, 1759)
- Furcula interrupta (Christoph, 1867)
- Furcula modesta (Hudson, 1891)
- Furcula nicetia (Schaus, 1928)
- Furcula nivea (Neumoegen, 1891)
- Furcula occidentalis (Lintner, 1878) (was treated as a subspecies of F. furcula for some time)
- Furcula scolopendrina (Boisduval, 1869)
- Furcula tibetana Schintlmeister, 1998
