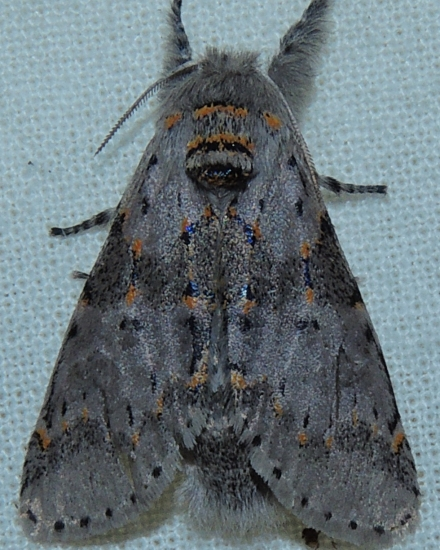

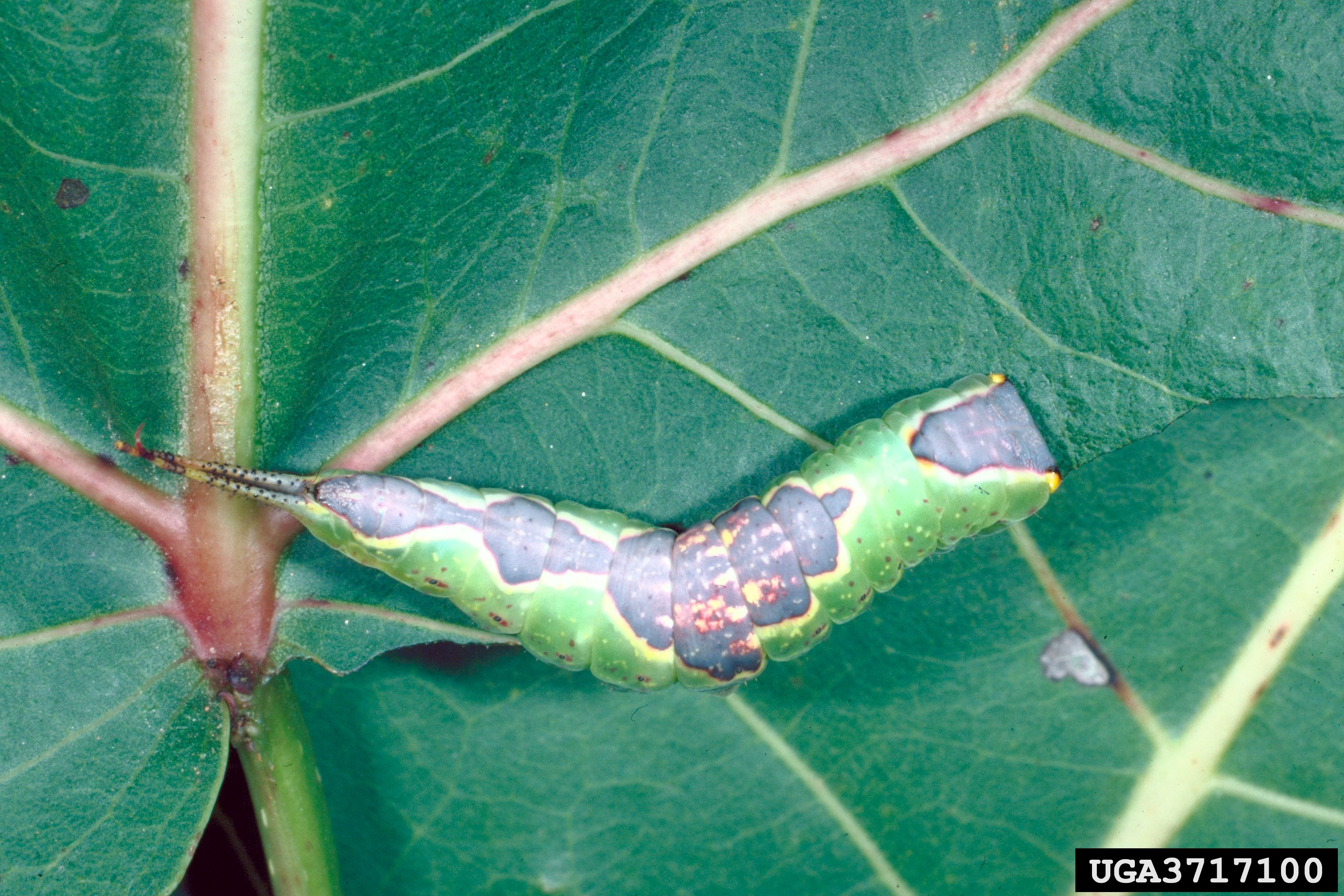
- Adult (top) and larva (bottom)

Scientific classification
- Kingdom: Animalia
- Phylum: Arthropoda
- Clade: Pancrustacea
- Class: Insecta
- Order: Lepidoptera
- Superfamily: Noctuoidea
- Family: Notodontidae
- Genus: Furcula
- Species: F. cinerea

Binomial name
- Furcula cinerea (Walker, 1865)

Synonyms
- Cerura cinerea Walker, 1865; Cerura paradoxa Behr, 1885; Cerura cinereoides Dyar, 1890; Cerura paradoxa Dyar, 1892; Cerura placida Dyar, 1892; Cerura wileyi Dyar, 1922

= Furcula cinerea =

Gray furcula moth

Species of moth

Furcula cinerea, the gray furcula moth, is a species of moth in the family Notodontidae. It was first described by Francis Walker in 1865. It is found in the United States, southern Canada and the Northwest Territories.

The wingspan is 33–45 mm. Adults are on wing from April to September in the south and from May to August in the north. There are two generations per year in the south. In the north there is only one generation.

The larvae feed on the leaves of Betula, Populus and Salix species. Larvae can be found from spring to fall in the south and from July to August in the north. The species overwinters in the pupal stage.
