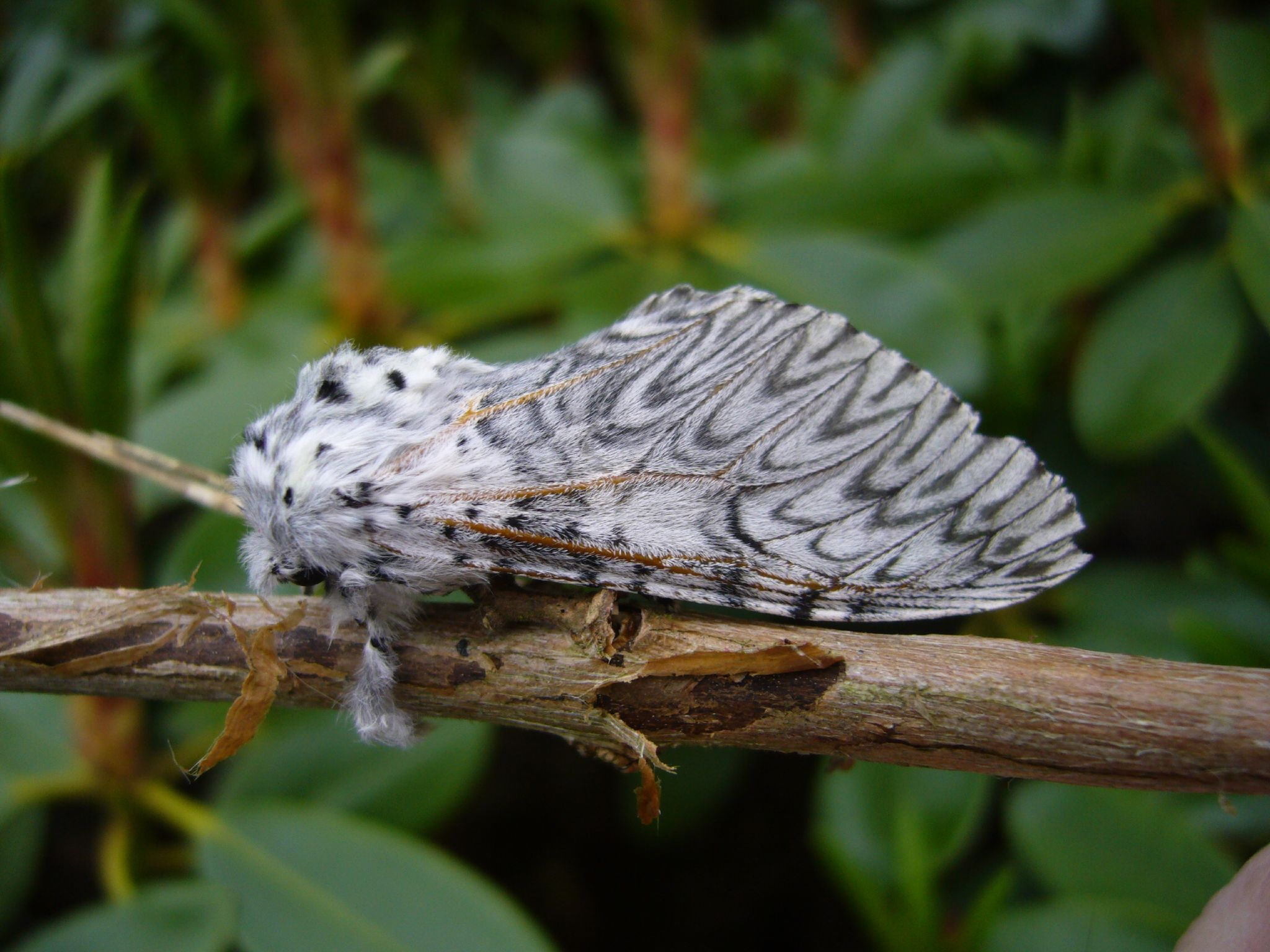
- Cerura vinula. Side view
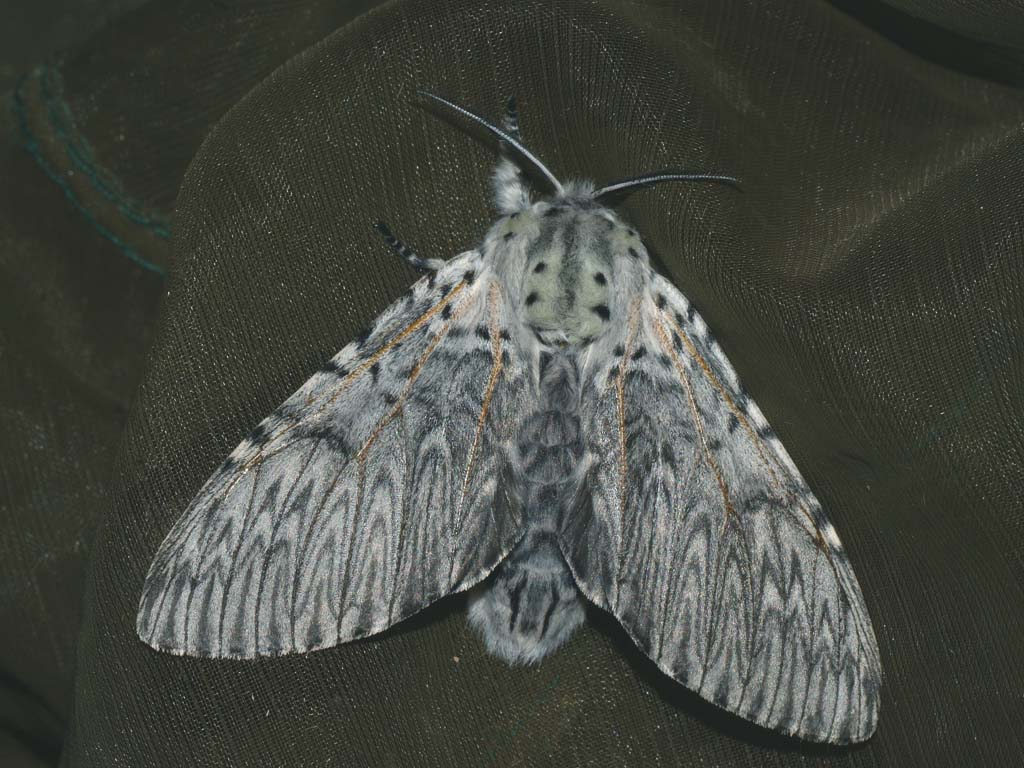
- Dorsal view

Scientific classification
- Kingdom: Animalia
- Phylum: Arthropoda
- Clade: Pancrustacea
- Class: Insecta
- Order: Lepidoptera
- Superfamily: Noctuoidea
- Family: Notodontidae
- Genus: Cerura
- Species: C. vinula

Binomial name
- Cerura vinula (Linnaeus, 1758)

Synonyms
- Phalaena vinula Linnaeus, 1758; Phalaena diuramajor Retzius, 1783; Cerura borealis

= Cerura vinula =

Puss moth

Species of moth

Cerura vinula, the puss moth (pronounced /pʊs/, puuss), is a lepidopteran from the family Notodontidae. The species was first described by Carl Linnaeus in his 1758 10th edition of Systema Naturae.

== Subspecies ==
Subspecies include:

- Cerura vinula benderi (Lattin, Becker & Roesler, 1974)
- Cerura vinula estonica (Huene, 1905)
- Cerura vinula irakana (Heydemann, Schulte & Remane, 1963)
- Cerura vinula phantoma (Dalman, 1823)
- Cerura vinula vinula (Linnaeus, 1758)

== Description ==
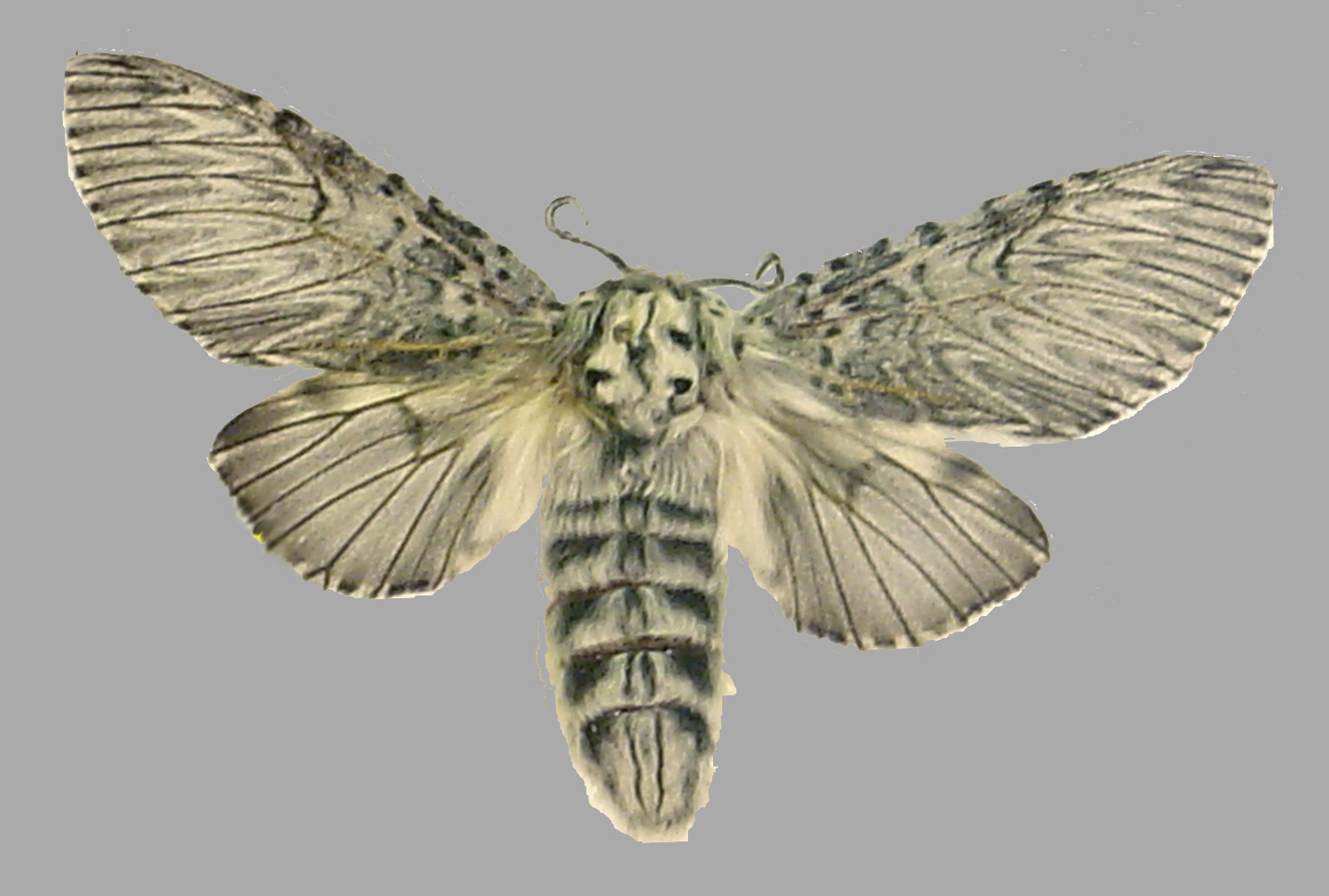
Mounted specimen

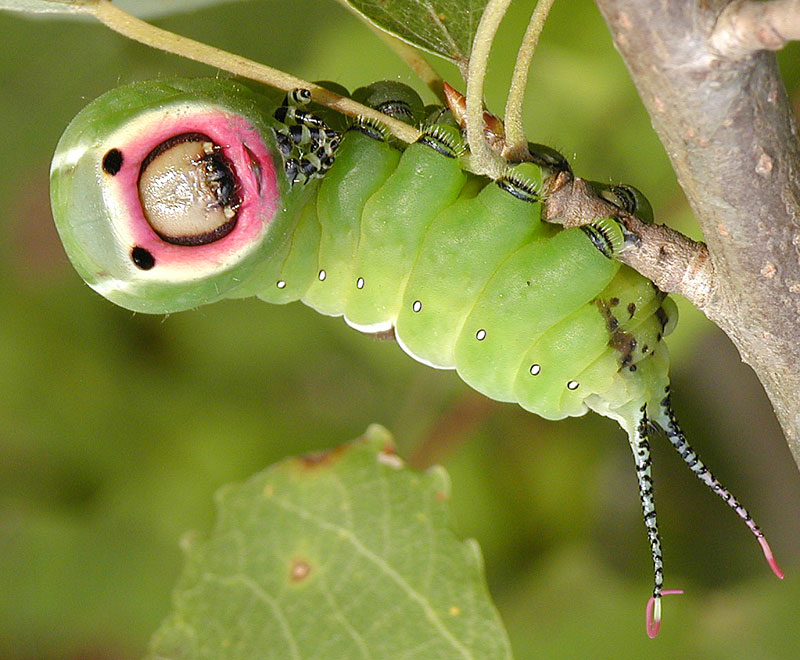
Caterpillar frontal view

Cerura vinula has a wingspan of 58 millimetres (2.3 in) to 75 millimetres (3.0 in) – the males are slightly smaller. The head, thorax, and body of these moths are very fluffy, with a cat-like appearance (hence the common English name puss moth). The antennæ are bipectinated. They have white or yellowish-gray forewings crossed by several wave-like dark lines. The hindwings are light gray or whitish in the males, while in the females they are suffused with blackish but almost transparent. The body is whitish gray, with the dorsal abdomen banded in black.

The caterpillars grow to about 80 millimetres (3.1 in) long. They are at first completely black and moult to light green with a dark dorsal pattern outlined in white or yellow. They also develop a tail fork with two long dark-colored tips bearing red extendable flagellae. The chrysalis is reddish brown, enclosed in a hard cocoon attached to the host plant.

== Distribution ==
The moth is a Palearctic realm species and lives throughout Europe (Albania, Austria, Belarus, Belgium, Bosnia and Herzegovina, United Kingdom, Bulgaria, European Russia, Croatia, Czech Republic, Denmark, Estonia, European Turkey, Finland, France, Germany, Greece, Hungary, Ireland, Italy, Latvia, Lithuania, Republic of North Macedonia, Republic of Moldova, Norway, Poland, Romania, Slovakia, Slovenia, Spain, Sweden, Switzerland, The Netherlands, Ukraine and Yugoslavia), across temperate Asia to China and in North Africa.

== Habitat ==
This moth mostly lives in very dense woodland areas.

== Biology ==
The flight period extends from April to August, depending on elevation, with one generation per year. Host plants include willow and poplar, especially the aspen, Populus tremula.

Females lay their chocolate-brown, 1.5 millimetres (0.059 in) wide, hemispherical eggs on the upper side of the leaves of their food plants. The moth survives the winter as a pupa in a very solid wood-reinforced cocoon, usually attached to vegetation.

The caterpillars have an unusual defense behavior. When disturbed, they strike a defensive pose raising the head with a reddish area and waving the twin tails with pinkish extendable flagellae. They may squirt formic acid at the attacker if the defense warning is unheeded.

== Gallery ==
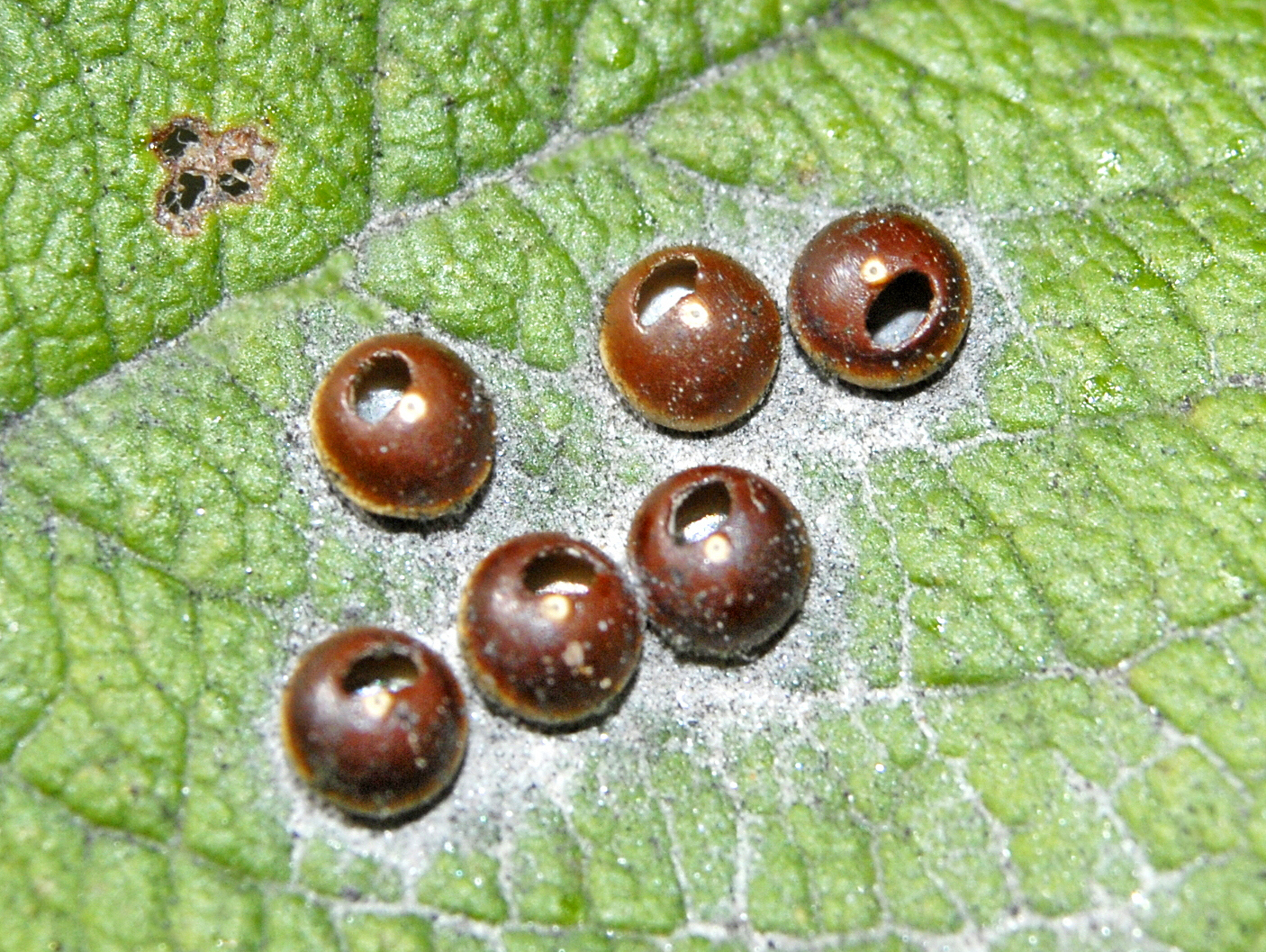
Hatched eggs

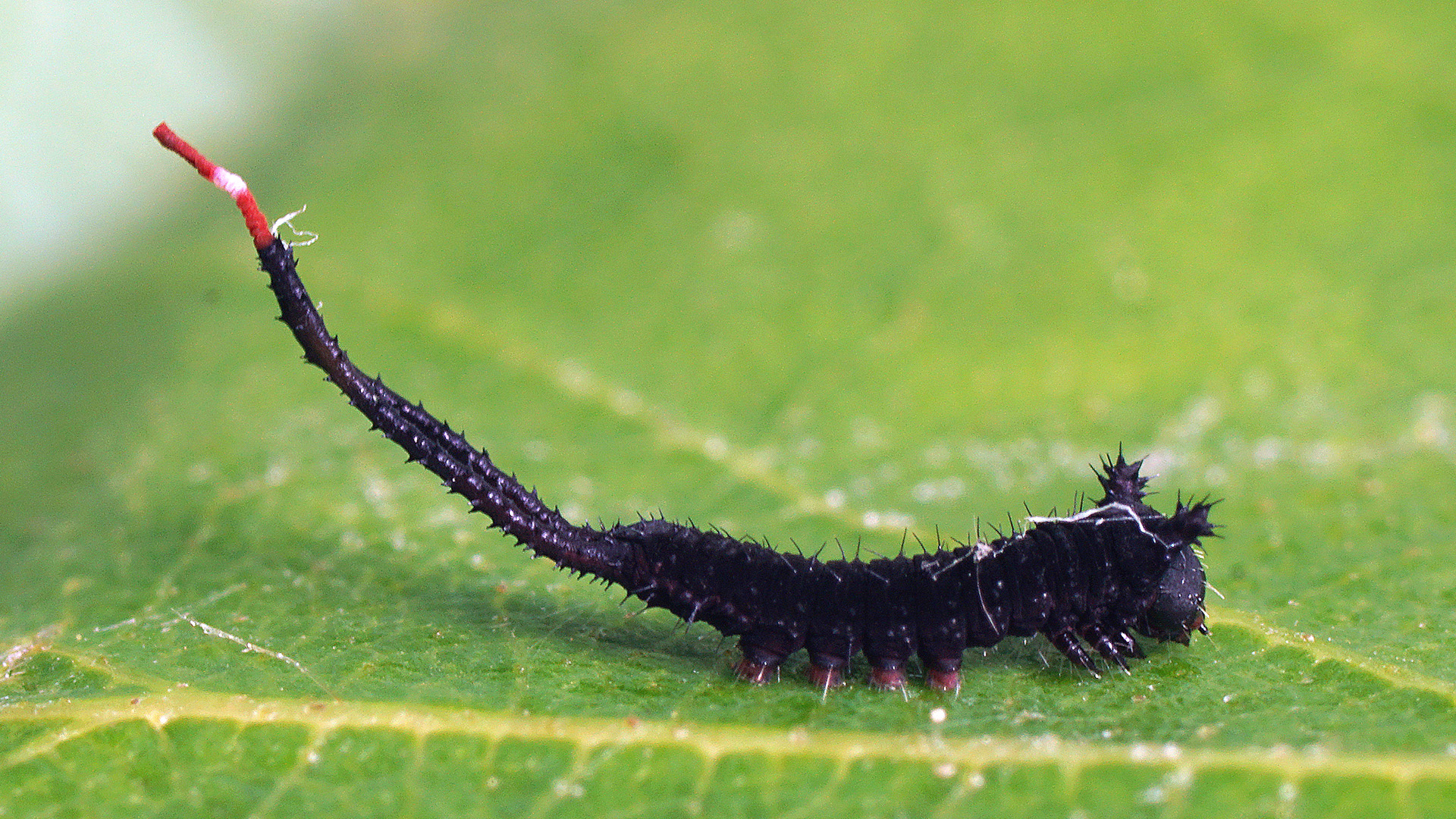
Young caterpillar

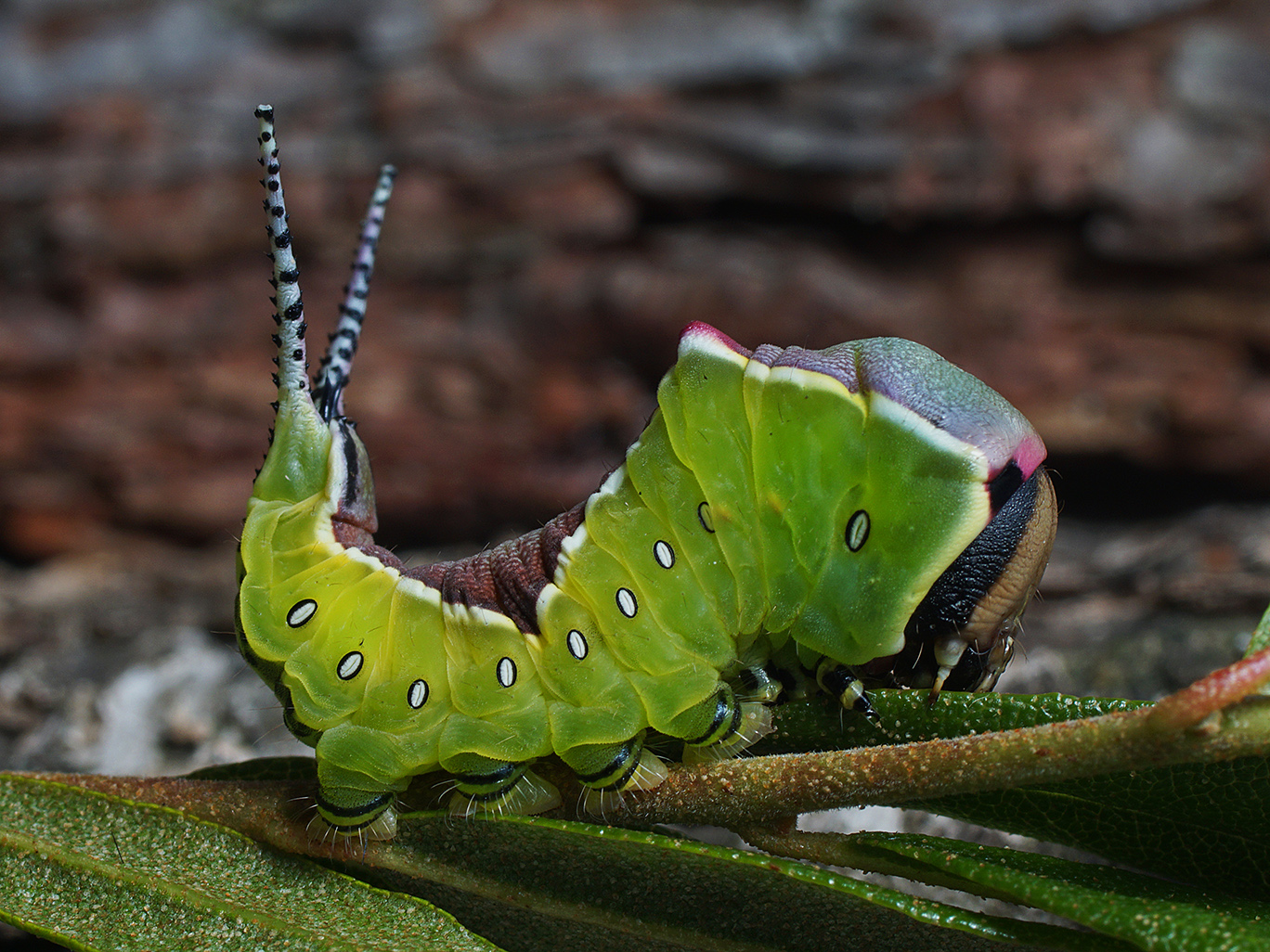
Caterpillar, 3rd instar

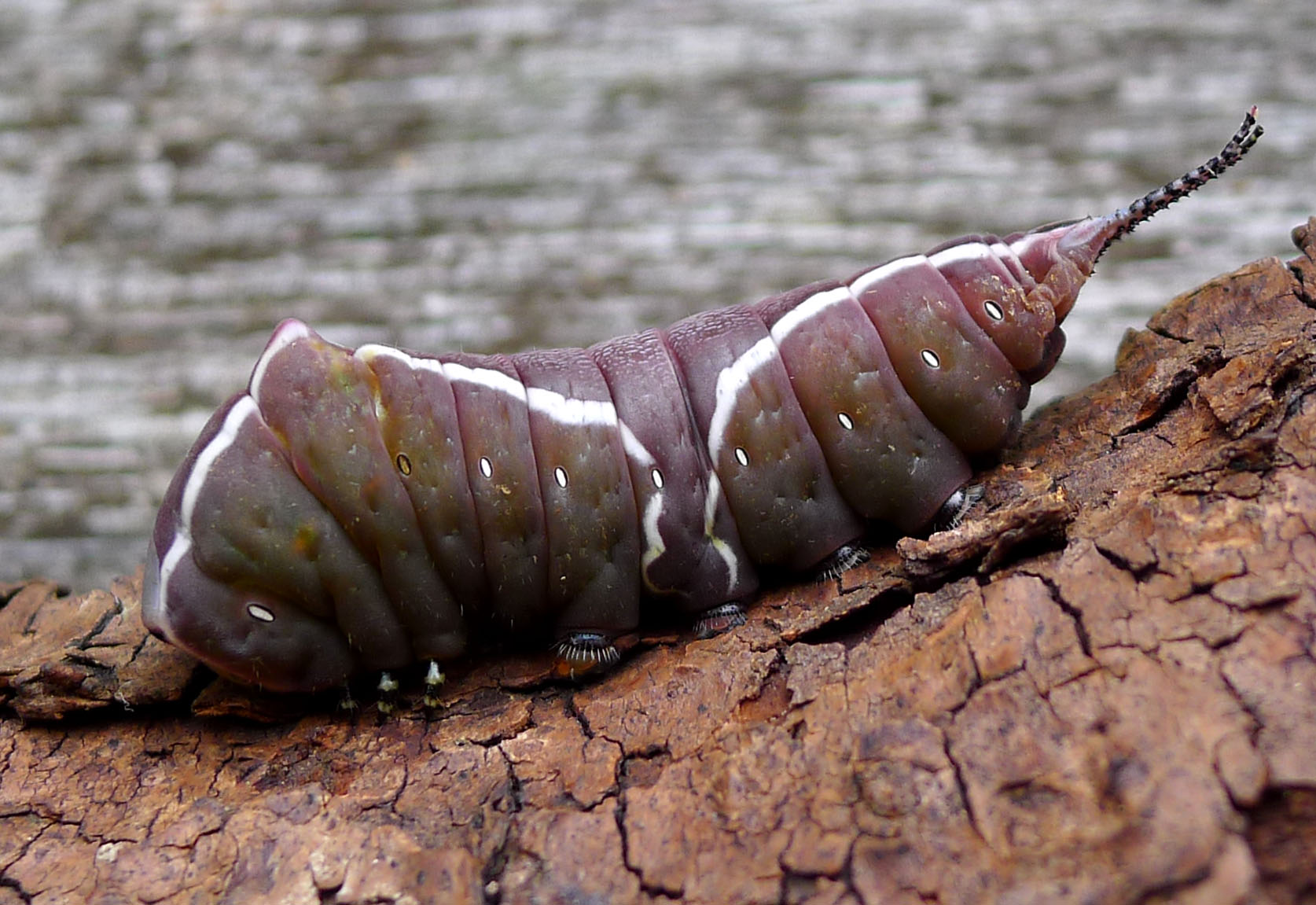
Last stage

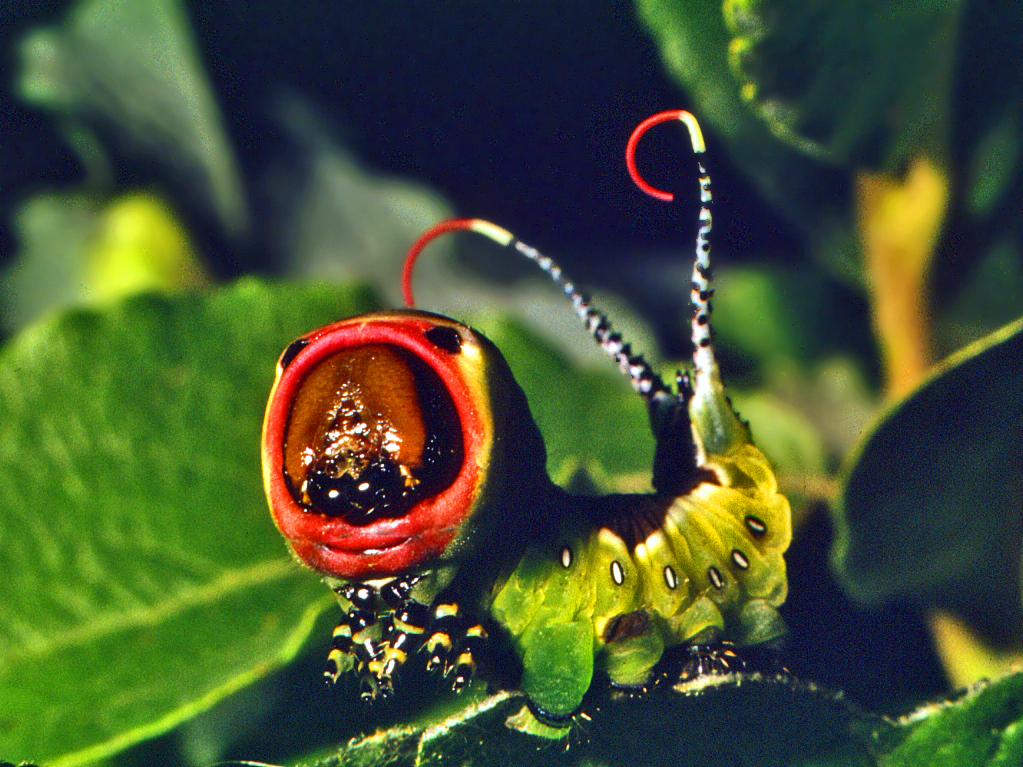
Caterpillar in defensive pose
