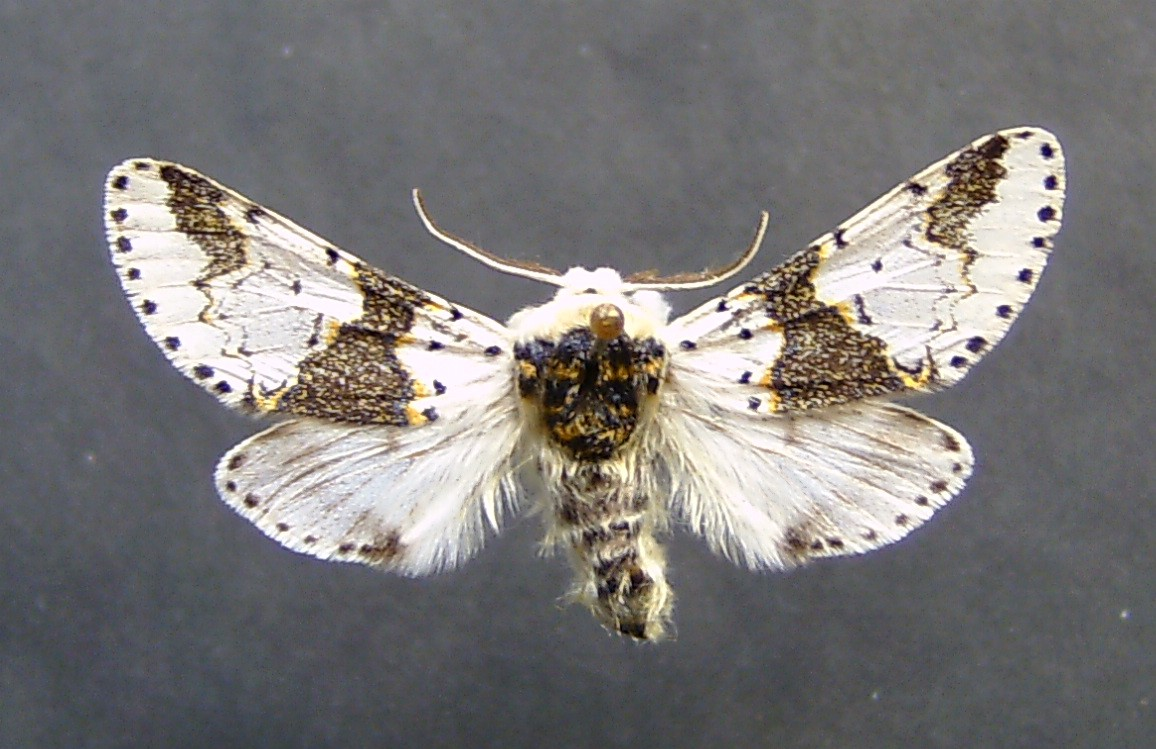

Scientific classification
- Kingdom: Animalia
- Phylum: Arthropoda
- Clade: Pancrustacea
- Class: Insecta
- Order: Lepidoptera
- Superfamily: Noctuoidea
- Family: Notodontidae
- Genus: Furcula
- Species: F. bicuspis

Binomial name
- Furcula bicuspis (Borkhausen, 1790)

= Furcula bicuspis =

Alder kitten

Species of moth

Furcula bicuspis, the alder kitten, is a moth of the family Notodontidae. The species was first described by Moritz Balthasar Borkhausen in 1790. It is found in most of the Palearctic realm.

The wingspan is 30–35 mm. The moths are on wing from May to July depending on the location.

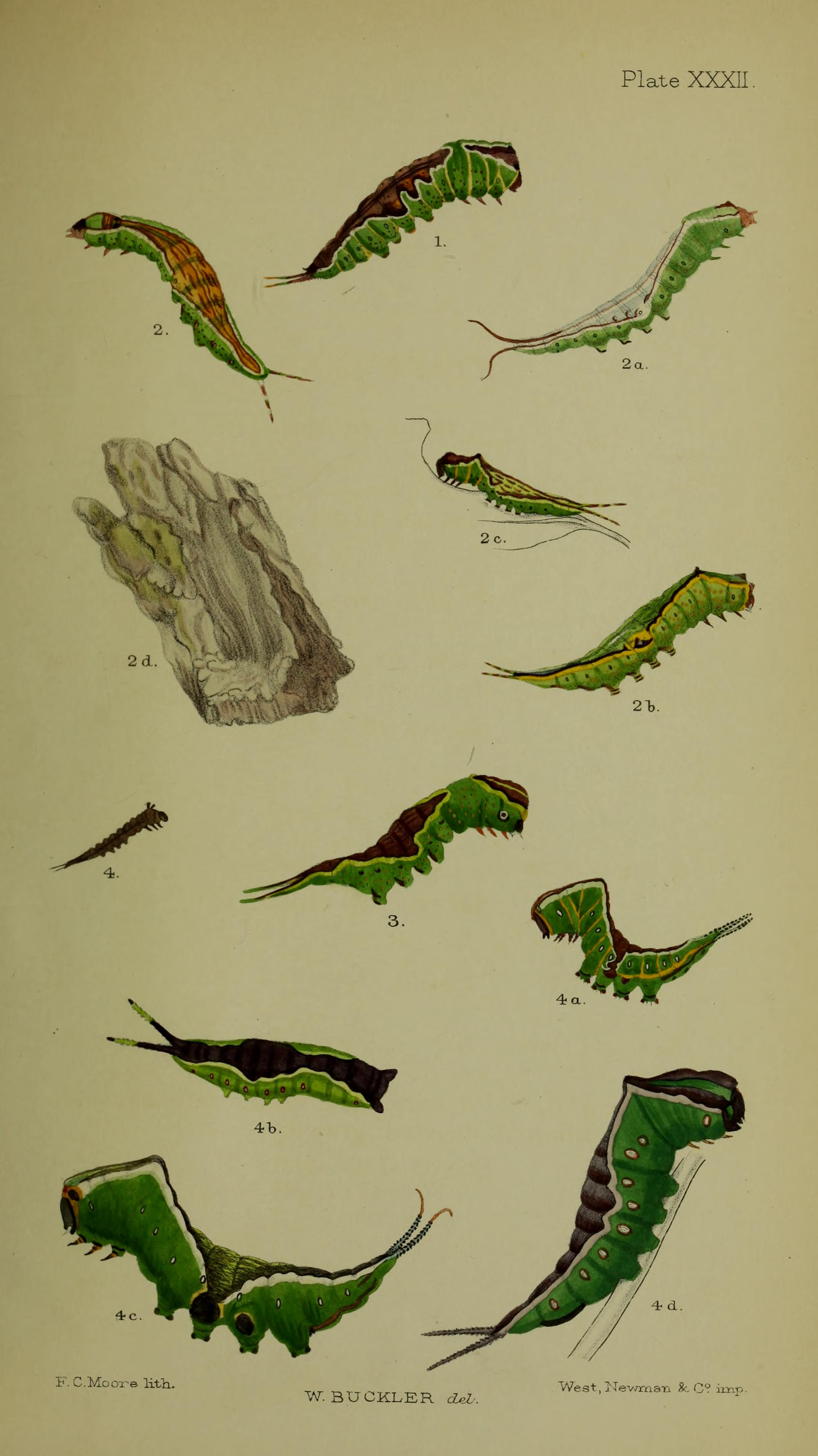
Figs. 1, 1a larva after last moult

The larvae feed on Betula species and Alnus glutinosa.
