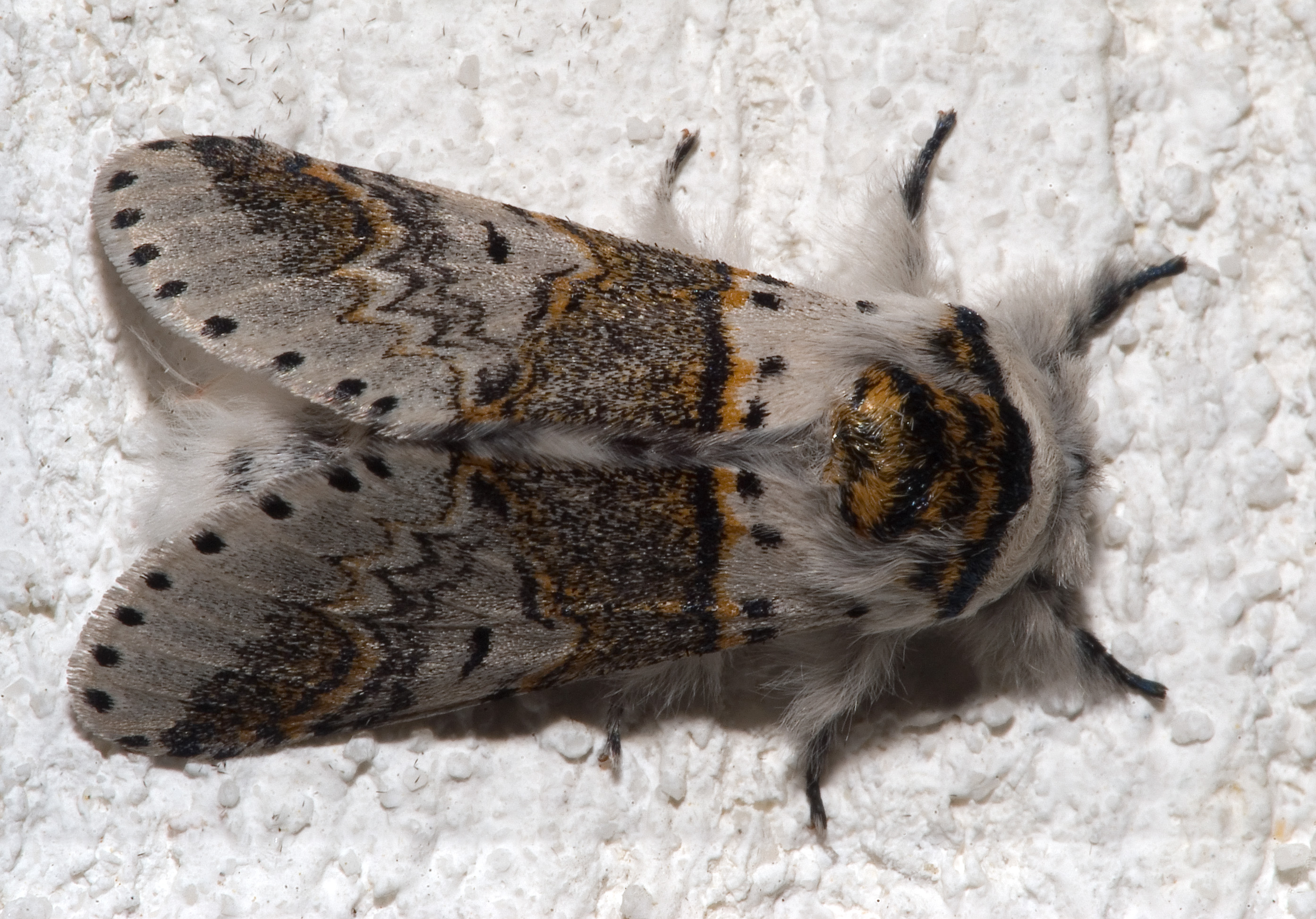
- Male

Scientific classification
- Kingdom: Animalia
- Phylum: Arthropoda
- Clade: Pancrustacea
- Class: Insecta
- Order: Lepidoptera
- Superfamily: Noctuoidea
- Family: Notodontidae
- Genus: Furcula
- Species: F. furcula

Binomial name
- Furcula furcula (Clerck, 1759)

= Furcula furcula =

Sallow kitten

Species of moth

Furcula furcula, the sallow kitten, is a moth from the family Notodontidae. It was first described by the Swedish entomologist Carl Alexander Clerck in 1759 from a specimen found in Sweden.

== Distribution ==
The moth can be found in Europe (including the Mediterranean region), Anatolia and through Asia to China. It is also found in North America.

== Description ==
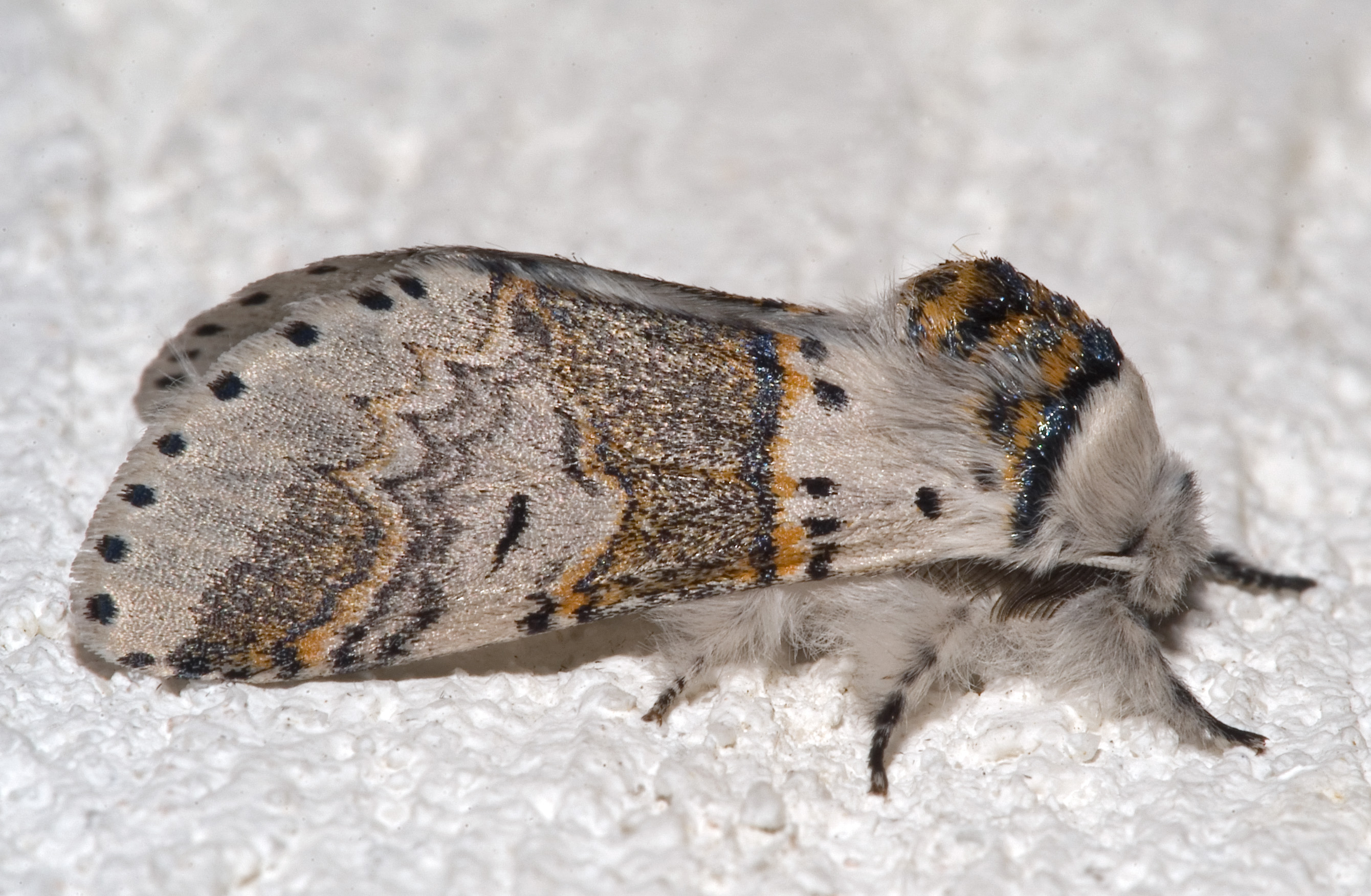
Male

The sallow kitten is grey/white and has a wingspan of 27 to 35 mm. The first part of the wing has a large grey middle band. It differs from the poplar kitten (Furcula bifida) in its generally smaller size, but more especially in the shape of the black line forming the outer margin of the central band; this is always more or less angled or dentate towards the front margin of the wings, whereas, in the poplar kitten, this portion of the line forms a clean curve.

== Technical description (Seitz) ==
The blackish grey median band is sharply edged with black, its distal sinus usually extends only to the apex of the cell; beyond the middle 3 parallel dentate lines. In borealis Borkh, from Lapland and Northern Russia, thorax and wings are blackish smoke-colour; specimens from Amurland also are somewhat darker than those from Central and Southern Europe. sangaica Moore, which inhabits North and Central China, is distinguished by its narrower median band (egg black). The larva is at first blackish, and at later stages becomes yellowish green clotted with red, a large patch on the thorax and continuous with it dorsal spots on abdominal segments 1 through 8; the spot on segment 4 is the largest, extending sideways to the stigmata. Head of the same colour as the spots. Anal filaments with red-brown. Pupa in a brown cocoon, yellowish brown with greenish wing-cases; frequently hibernates twice.

== Biology ==
The flight period ranges from April to the end of August. Depending on location the moth has one or two generations per year and is attracted to light.

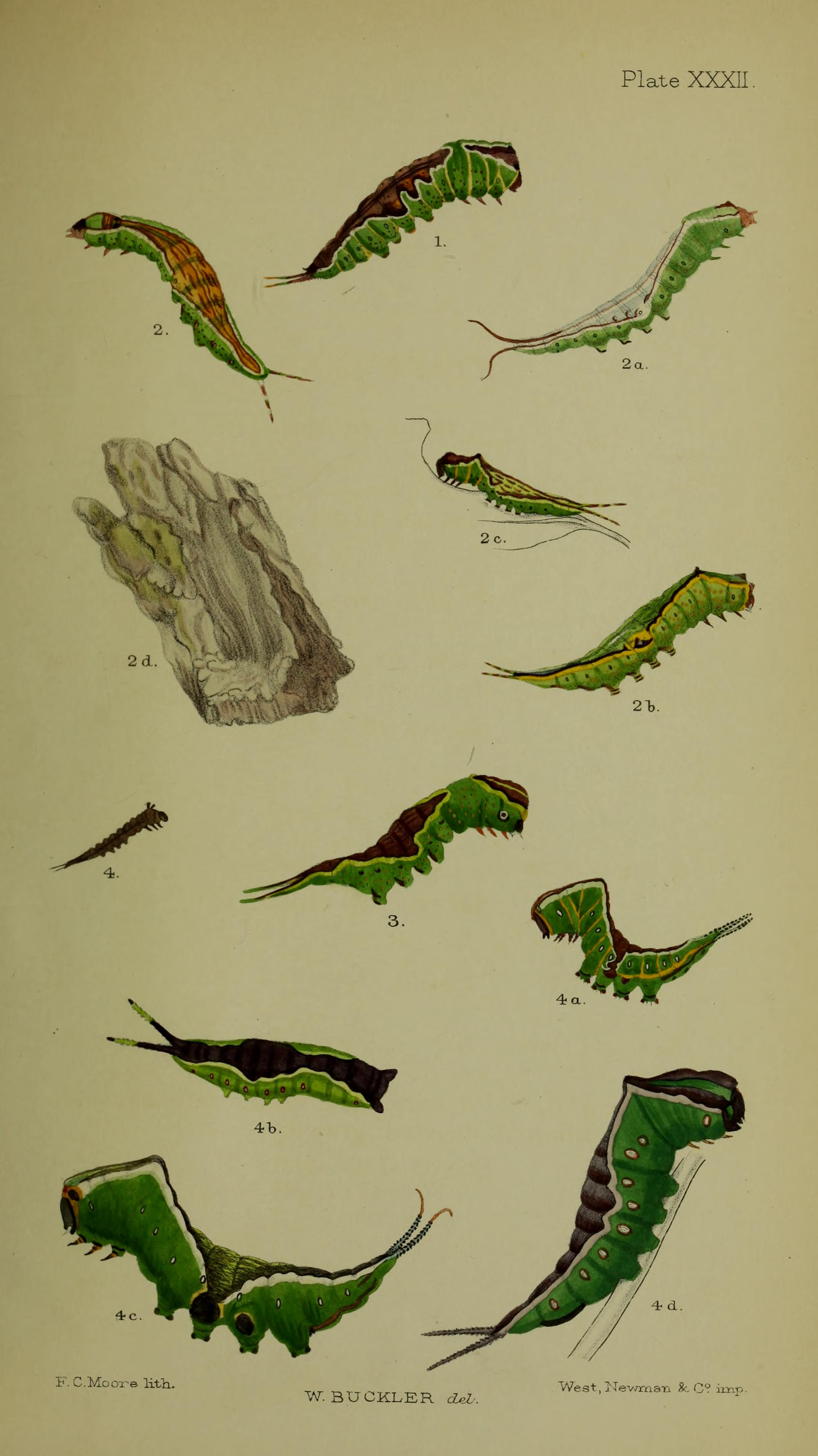
Figs. 2c larvae before last moult 2, 2a, 2b larva after last moult 2d bark of willow showing the cocoon

Ova

The dark purple, hemispherical eggs are laid in batches of two or three on the upper surface of leaves in May or June and again in August. They hatch after nine days.

Larvae

The caterpillar can grow up to 35 mm and is bright green with a purple brown marking on the saddle and can be found from May through to September. The main host plants are willow (Salix species) and occasionally aspen (Populus tremula) and other poplar (Populus species). Larvae can be found on small isolated moorland bushes.

Pupae

Before pupation the larva hollows out a recess. The pupa is dark purple-brown and pupation takes place in a tough cocoon constructed from a mixture of chewed wood-pulp and silk.
