= List of moths of Canada (Notodontidae) =

Partial list of Canadian moths

This is a list of the moths of family Notodontidae that are found in Canada. It also acts as an index to the species articles and forms part of the full List of moths of Canada.

Following the species name, there is an abbreviation that indicates the Canadian provinces or territories in which the species can be found.

- Western Canada
  - BC = British Columbia
  - AB = Alberta
  - SK = Saskatchewan
  - MB = Manitoba
  - YT = Yukon
  - NT = Northwest Territories
  - NU = Nunavut
- Eastern Canada
  - ON = Ontario
  - QC = Quebec
  - NB = New Brunswick
  - NS = Nova Scotia
  - PE = Prince Edward Island
  - NF = Newfoundland
  - LB = Labrador

== Subfamily Heterocampinae ==
- Heterocampa biundata Walker, 1855-MB, ON, NB
- Heterocampa guttivitta (Walker, 1855)-SK, MB, ON, NB, PE
- Heterocampa obliqua Packard, 1864-ON
- Heterocampa subrotata Harvey, 1874-ON
- Heterocampa umbrata Walker, 1855-SK, MB, ON, NB
- Lochmaeus bilineata (Packard, 1864)-SK, MB, ON, NB, PE
- Lochmaeus manteo Doubleday, 1841-MB, ON, NB, PE
- Macrurocampa marthesia (Cramer, 1780)-MB, ON, NB
- Misogada unicolor (Packard, 1864)-ON
- Oligocentria lignicolor (Walker, 1855)-SK, MB, ON, NB, PE
- Oligocentria pallida (Strecker, 1899)-BC
- Oligocentria semirufescens (Walker, 1865)-BC, AB, SK, MB, ON, NB
- Schizura apicalis (Grote & Robinson, 1866)-NB
- Schizura badia (Packard, 1864)-SK, MB, ON, NB
- Schizura concinna (Smith, 1797)-BC, SK, MB, ON, NB
- Schizura ipomoeae Doubleday, 1841-BC, SK, MB, ON, NB, PE, NF
- Schizura leptinoides (Grote, 1864)-AB, SK, MB, ON, NB
- Schizura unicornis (Smith, 1797)-BC, AB, SK, MB, ON, NB, PE, NF

== Subfamily Notodontinae ==
- Cerura scitiscripta Walker, 1865-AB, SK, MB, ON, QC
- Furcula borealis (Guérin-Méneville, 1832)-ON, QC, NB
- Furcula cinerea (Walker, 1865)-BC, AB, SK, MB, NT, ON, QC, NB, NS
- Furcula modesta (Hudson, 1891)-BC, AB, SK, MB, ON, QC, NB, NS
- Furcula occidentalis (Lintner, 1878)-BC, AB, SK, MB, ON, QC, NB, NS
- Furcula scolopendrina (Boisduval, 1869)-BC, AB, SK, ON, QC, NB, NS
- Gluphisia avimacula Hudson, 1891-AB, SK, MB, ON, QC, NB, NS, NF
- Gluphisia lintneri (Grote, 1877)-AB, SK, MB, ON, QC, NB, NS
- Gluphisia septentrionis Walker, 1855-BC, AB, SK, MB, YT, ON, QC, NB, NS, PE, NF
- Gluphisia severa Edwards, 1886-BC, AB
- Hyperaeschra georgica (Herrich-Schäffer, 1855)-MB, ON, QC, NB
- Notodonta pacifica Behr, 1892-BC
- Notodonta scitipennis Walker, 1862-AB, SK, MB, ON, QC, NB, NS, NF
- Notodonta simplaria Graef, 1881-BC, AB, SK, MB, YT, NT, ON, QC, NB, NS, NF
- Odontosia elegans (Strecker, 1885)-BC, AB, SK, MB, ON, QC, NB, NS
- Peridea angulosa (Smith, 1797)-MB, ON, QC, NB, NS
- Peridea basitriens (Walker, 1855)-ON, QC, NB, NS, PE
- Peridea ferruginea (Packard, 1864)-MB, ON, QC, NB, NS, PE, NF
- Pheosia portlandia Edwards, 1886-BC
- Pheosia rimosa Packard, 1864-BC, AB, SK, MB, ON, QC, NB, NS, PE, NF

== Subfamily Nystaleinae ==
- Dasylophia anguina (Smith, 1797)-AB, SK, MB, ON, QC
- Dasylophia thyatiroides (Walker, 1862)-ON, QC, NB, NS
- Symmerista albifrons (Smith, 1797)-QC, NB, NS
- Symmerista canicosta Franclemont, 1946-SK, MB, ON, QC, NB, NS, PE
- Symmerista leucitys Franclemont, 1946-MB, ON, QC, NB, NS

== Subfamily Phalerinae ==
- Datana angusii Grote & Robinson, 1866-ON, QC
- Datana contracta Walker, 1855-ON, QC
- Datana drexelii Edwards, 1884-ON, QC, NS
- Datana integerrima Grote & Robinson, 1866-ON, QC
- Datana ministra (Drury, 1773)-BC, SK, MB, ON, QC, NB, NS, PE
- Datana perspicua Grote & Robinson, 1865-ON, QC
- Ellida caniplaga (Walker, 1856)-ON, QC, NB
- Nadata gibbosa (Smith, 1797)-BC, AB, SK, MB, ON, QC, NB, NS, PE, NF

== Subfamily Pygaerinae ==
- Clostera albosigma Fitch, 1856-BC, AB, SK, MB, ON, QC, NB, NS, PE, NF
- Clostera apicalis (Walker, 1855)-BC, AB, SK, MB, NT, ON, QC, NB, NS, PE, NF
- Clostera brucei (Edwards, 1885)-BC, AB, SK, MB, YT, ON, QC
- Clostera inclusa (Hübner, [1831])-MB, ON, QC, NB
- Clostera strigosa (Grote, 1882)-BC, AB, SK, MB, ON, QC, NB, NS, PE
- Nerice bidentata Walker, 1855-SK, MB, ON, QC, NB, NS

== Unplaced ==
- Hyparpax aurora (Smith, 1797)-ON, QC, NS
