= Dicentria =

Scientific classification
- Kingdom: Animalia
- Phylum: Arthropoda
- Clade: Pancrustacea
- Class: Insecta
- Order: Lepidoptera
- Superfamily: Noctuoidea
- Family: Notodontidae
- Subfamily: Heterocampinae
- Genus: Dicentria; Herrich-Schäffer, 1855

Genus of moths

Dicentria is a genus of moths in the family Notodontidae. The genus contains about 46 described species occurring from Mexico south to Bolivia and Paraguay. Its affinities to the North American genera Schizura and Oligocentria are not fully understood.

== Selected species ==
- Dicentria argyroma Miller, 2011
- Dicentria centralis (Herrich-Schäffer, 1855)
- Dicentria cymatila Miller, 2011
- Dicentria violascens (Herrich-Schäffer, 1855)
