= Oligocentria alpica =

Scientific classification
- Kingdom: Animalia
- Phylum: Arthropoda
- Clade: Pancrustacea
- Class: Insecta
- Order: Lepidoptera
- Superfamily: Noctuoidea
- Family: Notodontidae
- Genus: Oligocentria
- Species: O. alpica

Binomial name
- Oligocentria alpica (Benjamin, 1932)

Species of moth

Oligocentria alpica is a species of moth in the family Notodontidae (the prominents). It was first described by Foster Hendrickson Benjamin in 1932 and it is found in North America.

The MONA or Hodges number for Oligocentria alpica is 8013.
