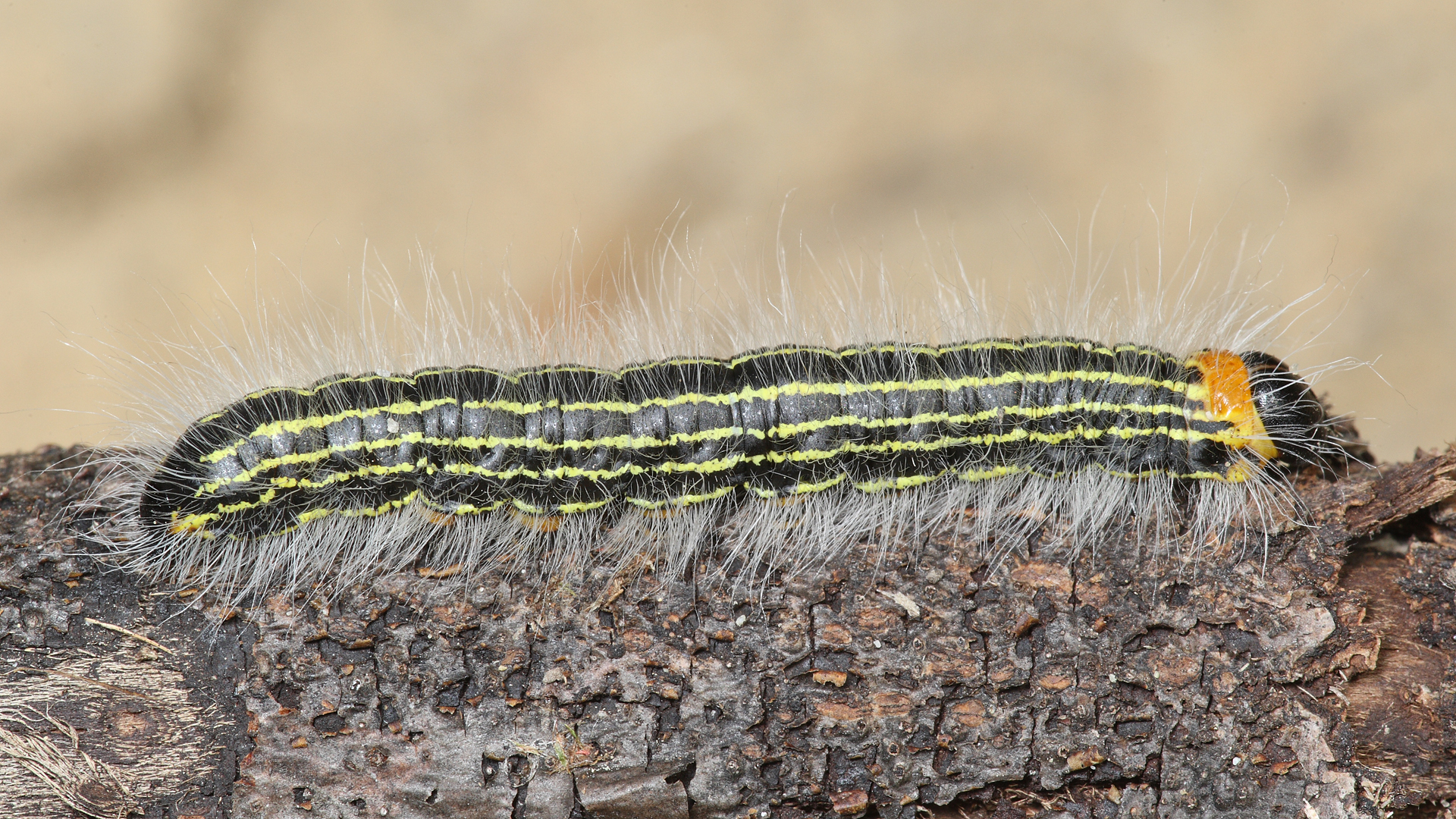
- Datana contracta

Scientific classification
- Kingdom: Animalia
- Phylum: Arthropoda
- Class: Insecta
- Order: Lepidoptera
- Superfamily: Noctuoidea
- Family: Notodontidae
- Subfamily: Phalerinae
- Genus: Datana; Walker, 1855

= Datana =

Genus of moths

Datana is a genus of moths of the family Notodontidae. The genus was erected by Francis Walker in 1855.

== Species ==
- Datana ministra (Drury, 1773)
- Datana angusii Grote & Robinson, 1866
- Datana drexelii H. Edwards, 1884
- Datana major Grote & Robinson, 1866
- Datana contracta Walker, 1855
- Datana integerrima Grote & Robinson, 1866
- Datana perspicua Grote & Robinson, 1865
- Datana robusta Strecker, 1878
- Datana modesta Beutenmüller, 1890
- Datana ranaeceps (Guérin-Méneville, 1832)
- Datana diffidens Dyar, 1917
- Datana neomexicana Doll, 1911
- Datana chiriquensis Dyar, 1895
