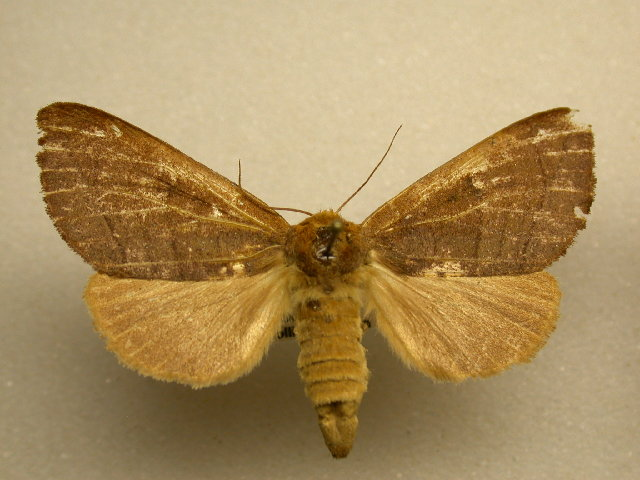

Scientific classification
- Domain: Eukaryota
- Kingdom: Animalia
- Phylum: Arthropoda
- Class: Insecta
- Order: Lepidoptera
- Superfamily: Noctuoidea
- Family: Notodontidae
- Genus: Datana
- Species: D. modesta

Binomial name
- Datana modesta Beutenmüller, 1890

= Datana modesta =

Species of moth

Datana modesta is a species of moth in the family Notodontidae (the prominents). It was first described by William Beutenmüller in 1890 and it is found in North America.

The MONA or Hodges number for Datana modesta is 7910.
