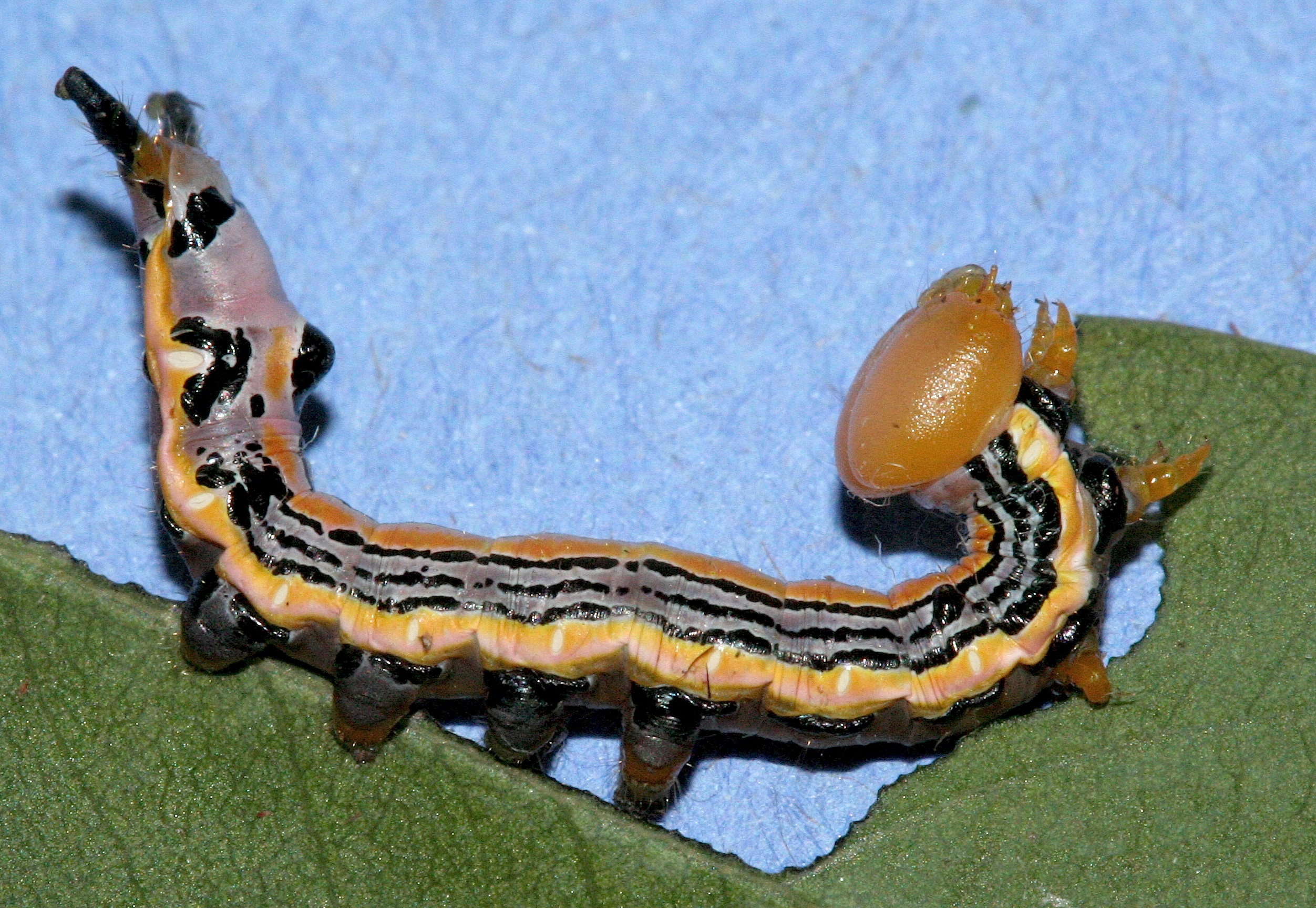
- Dasylophia anguina

Scientific classification
- Kingdom: Animalia
- Phylum: Arthropoda
- Clade: Pancrustacea
- Class: Insecta
- Order: Lepidoptera
- Superfamily: Noctuoidea
- Family: Notodontidae
- Subfamily: Nystaleinae
- Genus: Dasylophia; Packard, 1864

= Dasylophia =

Genus of moths

Dasylophia is a genus of moths of the family Notodontidae first described by Alpheus Spring Packard in 1864.

== Species ==
- Dasylophia anguina (J. E. Smith, 1797)
- Dasylophia lucia Schaus, 1901
- Dasylophia lupia (Druce, 1887)
- Dasylophia seriata (Druce, 1887)
- Dasylophia thyatiroides (Walker, 1862)
