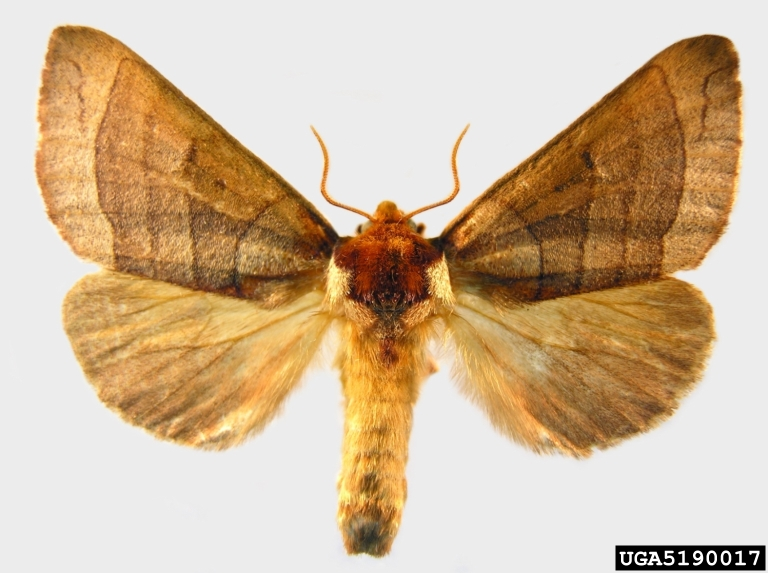

Scientific classification
- Kingdom: Animalia
- Phylum: Arthropoda
- Clade: Pancrustacea
- Class: Insecta
- Order: Lepidoptera
- Superfamily: Noctuoidea
- Family: Notodontidae
- Genus: Datana
- Species: D. major

Binomial name
- Datana major Grote & Robinson, 1866

= Datana major =

Species of moth

Datana major, the major datana or azalea caterpillar, is a moth of the family Notodontidae. It is found from Maryland to Florida, west to Kansas and Arkansas.

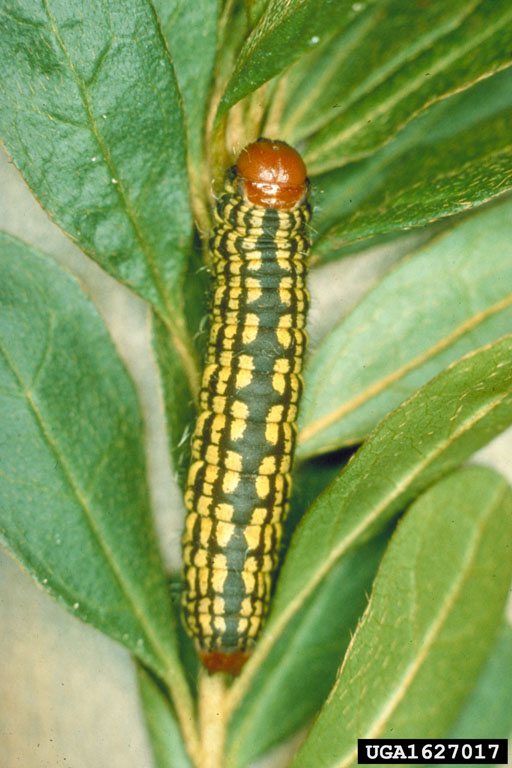

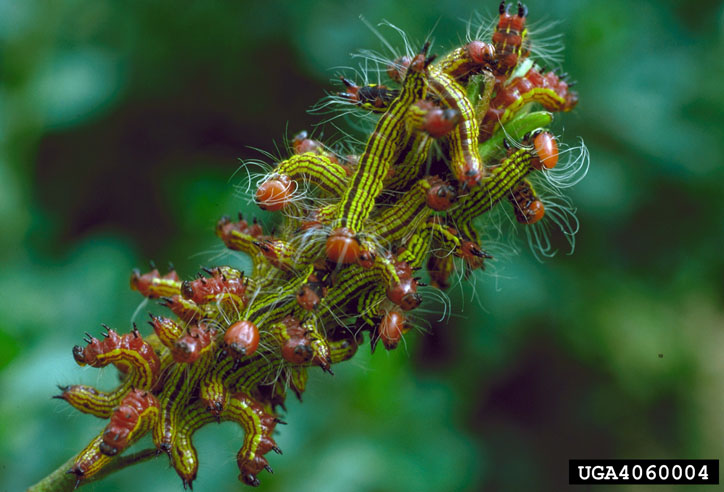

The wingspan is 40–50 mm. Adults are on wing from June to August. Normally, there is one generation per year, although there may be a partial second generation in the southern part of the range.

The larvae mainly feed on Rhododendron and Andromeda polifolia.
