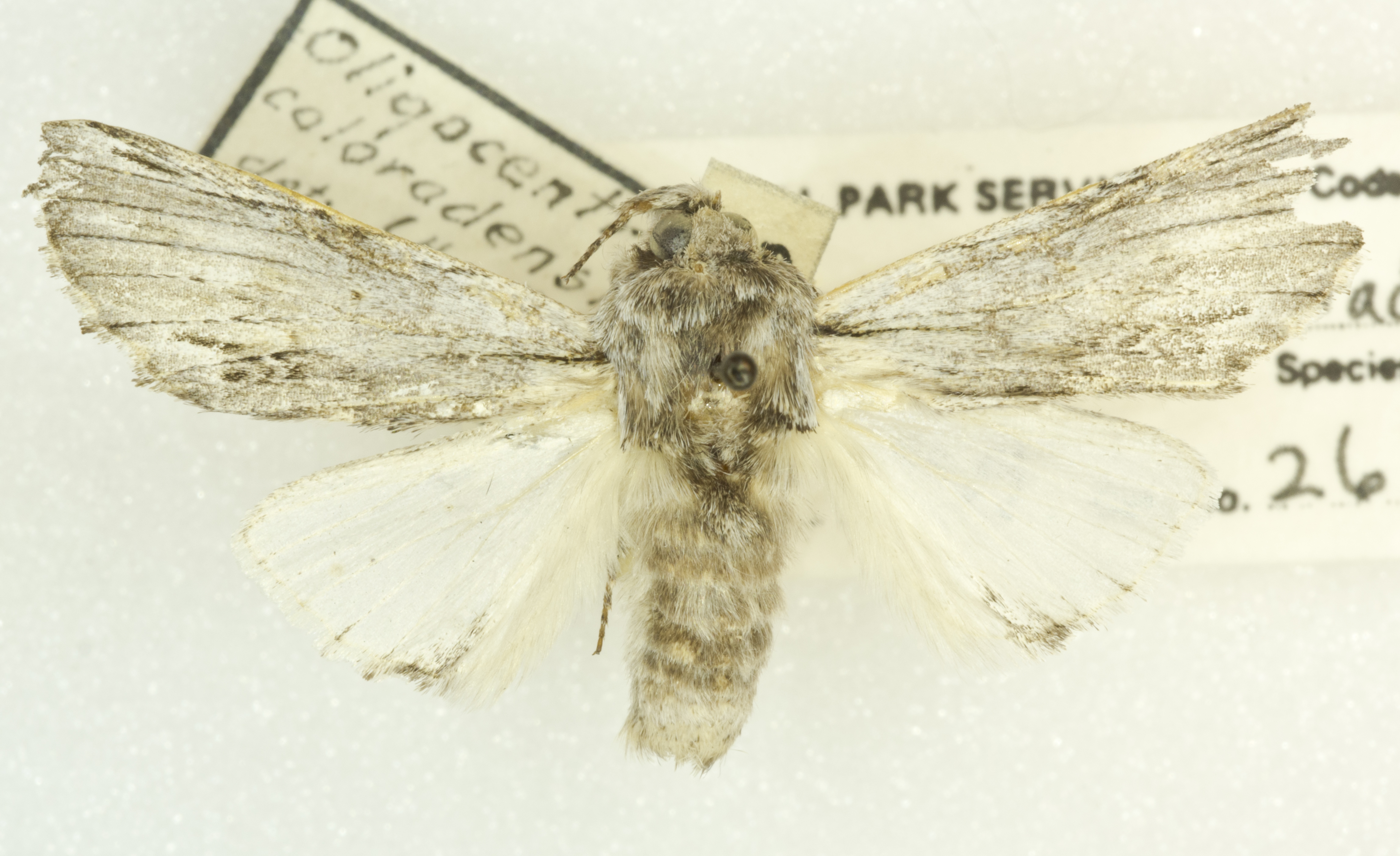

Scientific classification
- Kingdom: Animalia
- Phylum: Arthropoda
- Clade: Pancrustacea
- Class: Insecta
- Order: Lepidoptera
- Superfamily: Noctuoidea
- Family: Notodontidae
- Genus: Oligocentria
- Species: O. coloradensis

Binomial name
- Oligocentria coloradensis (H. Edwards, 1885)

= Oligocentria coloradensis =

Species of moth

Oligocentria coloradensis is a species of moth in the family Notodontidae (the prominents). It was first described by Henry Edwards in 1885 and it is found in North America.

The MONA or Hodges number for Oligocentria coloradensis is 8015.
