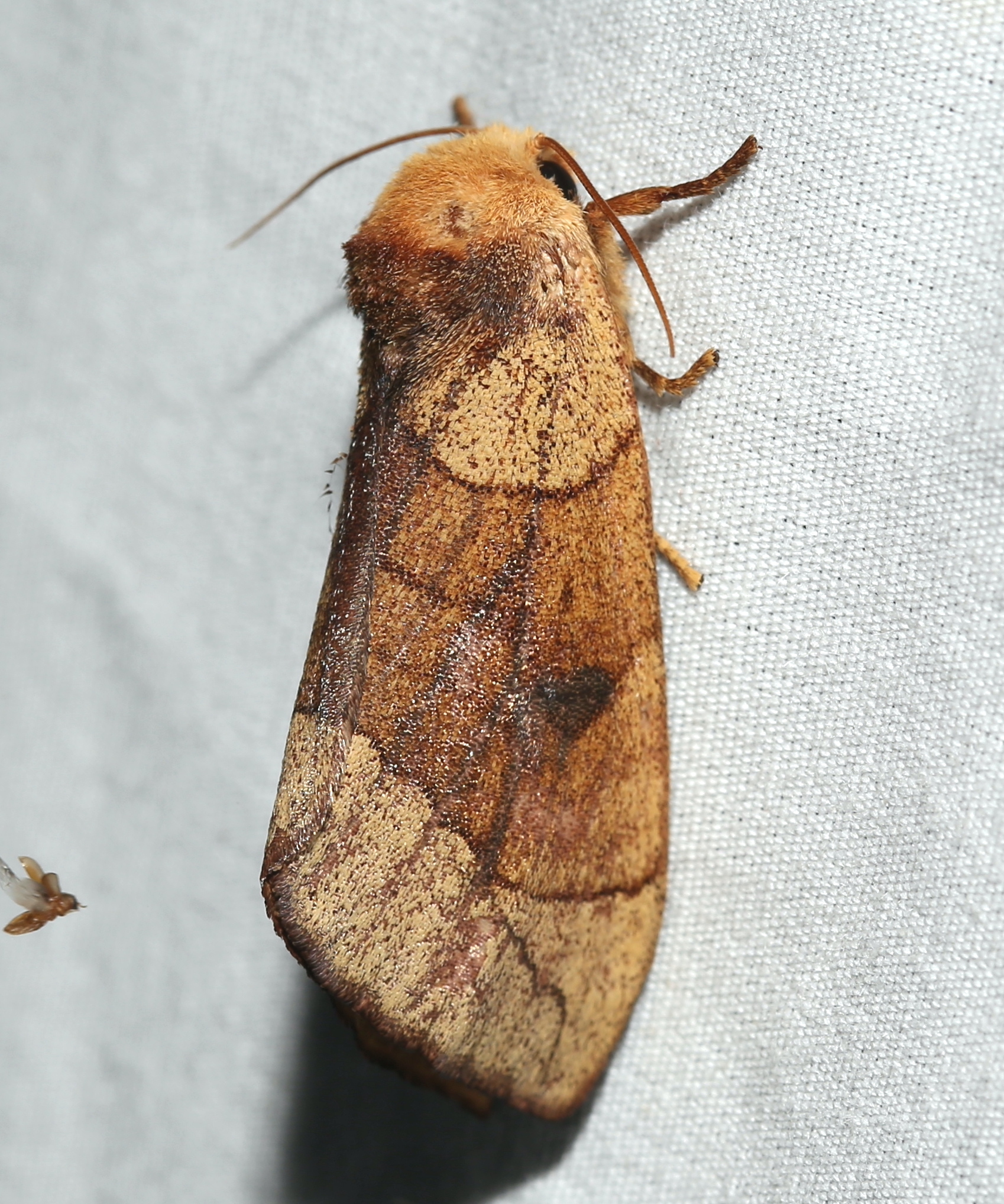

Scientific classification
- Kingdom: Animalia
- Phylum: Arthropoda
- Class: Insecta
- Order: Lepidoptera
- Superfamily: Noctuoidea
- Family: Notodontidae
- Genus: Datana
- Species: D. robusta

Binomial name
- Datana robusta Strecker, 1878

= Datana robusta =

Species of moth

Datana robusta, the annual buttonweed or robust datana moth, is a species of moth in the family Notodontidae (the prominents). It was first described by Herman Strecker in 1878 and it is found in North America.

The MONA or Hodges number for Datana robusta is 7909.
