= Datana diffidens =

Scientific classification
- Kingdom: Animalia
- Phylum: Arthropoda
- Class: Insecta
- Order: Lepidoptera
- Superfamily: Noctuoidea
- Family: Notodontidae
- Genus: Datana
- Species: D. diffidens

Binomial name
- Datana diffidens Dyar, 1917

Species of moth

Datana diffidens is a species of moth in the family Notodontidae (the prominents). It was first described by Harrison Gray Dyar Jr. in 1917 and it is found in North America.

The MONA or Hodges number for Datana diffidens is 7912.
