= Dicentria centralis =

Scientific classification
- Kingdom: Animalia
- Phylum: Arthropoda
- Clade: Pancrustacea
- Class: Insecta
- Order: Lepidoptera
- Superfamily: Noctuoidea
- Family: Notodontidae
- Genus: Dicentria
- Species: D. centralis

Binomial name
- Dicentria centralis (Herrich-Schäffer, 1855)

Synonyms
- Notodonta centralis Herrich-Schäffer, 1855; Schizura centralis

Species of moth

Dicentria centralis is a moth of the family Notodontidae. It is found from Mexico south to Brazil.
