= Dasylophia seriata =

Scientific classification
- Domain: Eukaryota
- Kingdom: Animalia
- Phylum: Arthropoda
- Class: Insecta
- Order: Lepidoptera
- Superfamily: Noctuoidea
- Family: Notodontidae
- Genus: Dasylophia
- Species: D. seriata

Binomial name
- Dasylophia seriata (Druce, 1887)

Species of moth

Dasylophia seriata, the western legume prominent, is a species of moth in the family Notodontidae (the prominents). It was first described by Druce in 1887 and it is found in North America.

The MONA or Hodges number for Dasylophia seriata is 7959.
