= Datana neomexicana =

Scientific classification
- Domain: Eukaryota
- Kingdom: Animalia
- Phylum: Arthropoda
- Class: Insecta
- Order: Lepidoptera
- Superfamily: Noctuoidea
- Family: Notodontidae
- Genus: Datana
- Species: D. neomexicana

Binomial name
- Datana neomexicana Doll, 1911

Species of moth

Datana neomexicana is a species of moth in the family Notodontidae (the prominents). It was first described by Doll in 1911 and it is found in North America.

The MONA or Hodges number for Datana neomexicana is 7913.
