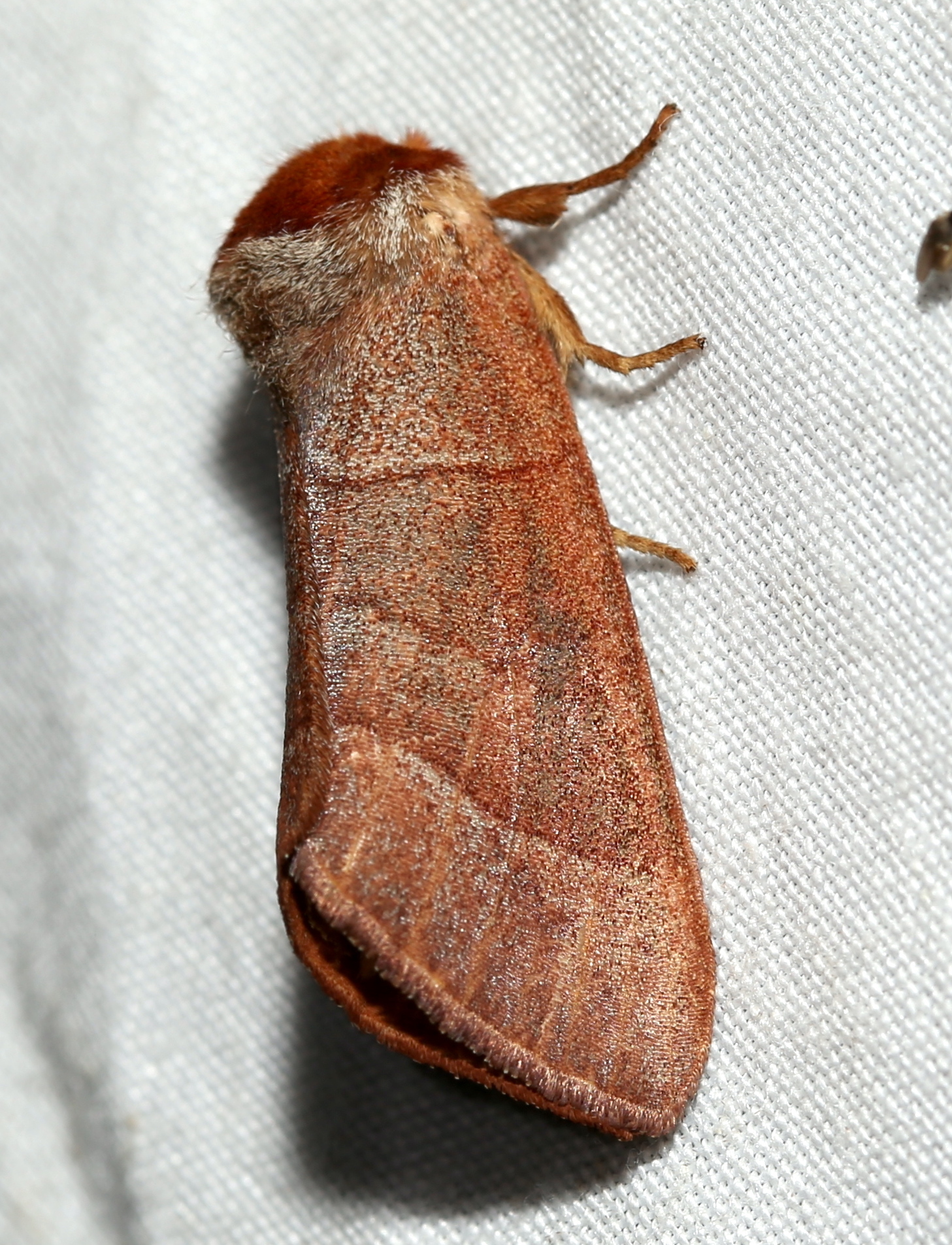

Scientific classification
- Kingdom: Animalia
- Phylum: Arthropoda
- Clade: Pancrustacea
- Class: Insecta
- Order: Lepidoptera
- Superfamily: Noctuoidea
- Family: Notodontidae
- Genus: Datana
- Species: D. ranaeceps

Binomial name
- Datana ranaeceps (Guérin-Méneville, 1844)

= Datana ranaeceps =

Species of moth

Datana ranaeceps, the post-burn datana, is a species of moth in the family Notodontidae (the prominents). Other common names include the heart-leaved catchfly and ranaeceps datana moth. It was first described by Félix Édouard Guérin-Méneville in 1844 and it is found in North America.

The MONA or Hodges number for Datana ranaeceps is 7911.
