= Dicentria argyroma =

Scientific classification
- Kingdom: Animalia
- Phylum: Arthropoda
- Clade: Pancrustacea
- Class: Insecta
- Order: Lepidoptera
- Superfamily: Noctuoidea
- Family: Notodontidae
- Genus: Dicentria
- Species: D. argyroma

Binomial name
- Dicentria argyroma Miller, 2011

Species of moth

Dicentria argyroma is a moth of the family Notodontidae. It is found in north-eastern Ecuador.

The length of the forewings is 18.5–21 mm.
