= Datana chiriquensis =

Scientific classification
- Kingdom: Animalia
- Phylum: Arthropoda
- Clade: Pancrustacea
- Class: Insecta
- Order: Lepidoptera
- Superfamily: Noctuoidea
- Family: Notodontidae
- Genus: Datana
- Species: D. chiriquensis

Binomial name
- Datana chiriquensis Dyar, 1895

Species of moth

Datana chiriquensis is a species of moth in the family Notodontidae (the prominents). It was first described by Harrison Gray Dyar Jr. in 1895 and it is found in North America.
