= Oligocentria pinalensis =

Conservation status
- Data Deficient (IUCN 3.1)

Scientific classification
- Kingdom: Animalia
- Phylum: Arthropoda
- Clade: Pancrustacea
- Class: Insecta
- Order: Lepidoptera
- Superfamily: Noctuoidea
- Family: Notodontidae
- Genus: Oligocentria
- Species: O. pinalensis

Binomial name
- Oligocentria pinalensis (F.H. Benjamin, 1932)

Synonyms
- Ianassa pinalensis Benjamin, 1932

Species of moth

Oligocentria pinalensis, the Arizona prominent, is a moth of the family Notodontidae. It is only found within the Pinal Mountains of central Arizona. Due to its extremely limited known range, Oligocentria pinalensis is at a high risk of becoming extinct from isolated events, such as a forest fire. There is not enough current population data to make a full conclusion of its present status. Although it has been listed by the NatureServe conservation status as "GH" or possibly extinct, date of listing of status was 2002. The species was first described by F.H. Benjamin, a pan-pacific entomologist, in a publication from 1932.

== Description ==
Oligocentria pinalensis has been described as a medium to large sized moth, with a long forewing that typically extends two times longer than the hindwing and has a stout body for its wing size. The head has scale tufts and the antennae are bispectinate on males and filiform in females. They have a well developed proboscis that is coiled and their abdomen is densely covered in long slender scales and tufts. They are dull-colored, usually being brown, tan or gray or varying mixtures of the three colors. The larvae have bare stout bodies, and have two MD setae above their spiracle on their abdomen, versus the usual one for other members of Oligocentria.

== Range ==
The only known range of the moth is the Pinal Mountains in Gila County, Arizona, a mountain range that covers approximately 45,760 acres.
