= Oligocentria paradisus =

Scientific classification
- Kingdom: Animalia
- Phylum: Arthropoda
- Clade: Pancrustacea
- Class: Insecta
- Order: Lepidoptera
- Superfamily: Noctuoidea
- Family: Notodontidae
- Genus: Oligocentria
- Species: O. paradisus

Binomial name
- Oligocentria paradisus (Benjamin, 1932)

Species of moth

Oligocentria paradisus is a species of moth in the family Notodontidae (the prominents). It was first described by Foster Hendrickson Benjamin in 1932 and it is found in North America.

The MONA or Hodges number for Oligocentria paradisus is 8019.
