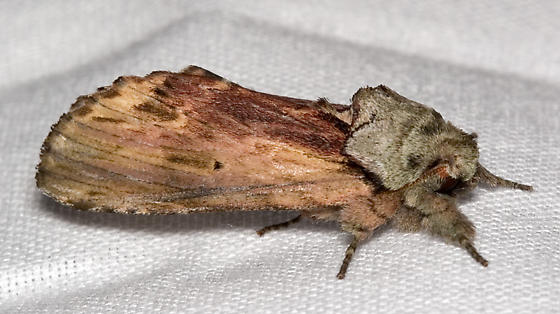
- Oligocentria semirufescens

Scientific classification
- Kingdom: Animalia
- Phylum: Arthropoda
- Clade: Pancrustacea
- Class: Insecta
- Order: Lepidoptera
- Superfamily: Noctuoidea
- Family: Notodontidae
- Subfamily: Heterocampinae
- Genus: Oligocentria; Herrich-Schäffer, 1855

= Oligocentria =

Genus of moths

Oligocentria is a genus of moths in the family Notodontidae, the prominents.

Species include:

- Oligocentria alpica (Benjamin, 1932)
- Oligocentria coloradensis (H. Edwards, 1885)
- Oligocentria delicata (Dyar, 1905)
- Oligocentria laciniosa (H. Edwards, 1885)
- Oligocentria lignicolor (Walker, 1855) – white-streaked prominent
- Oligocentria pallida (Strecker, 1899)
- Oligocentria paradisus (Benjamin, 1932)
- Oligocentria perangulata (H. Edwards, 1882)
- Oligocentria pinalensis (Benjamin, 1932)
- Oligocentria semirufescens (Walker, 1865) – red-washed prominent
