= Oligocentria delicata =

Scientific classification
- Kingdom: Animalia
- Phylum: Arthropoda
- Clade: Pancrustacea
- Class: Insecta
- Order: Lepidoptera
- Superfamily: Noctuoidea
- Family: Notodontidae
- Genus: Oligocentria
- Species: O. delicata

Binomial name
- Oligocentria delicata (Dyar, 1905)

Species of moth

Oligocentria delicata is a species of moth in the family Notodontidae (the prominents). It was first described by Harrison Gray Dyar Jr. in 1905 and it is found in North America.

The MONA or Hodges number for Oligocentria delicata is 8020.
