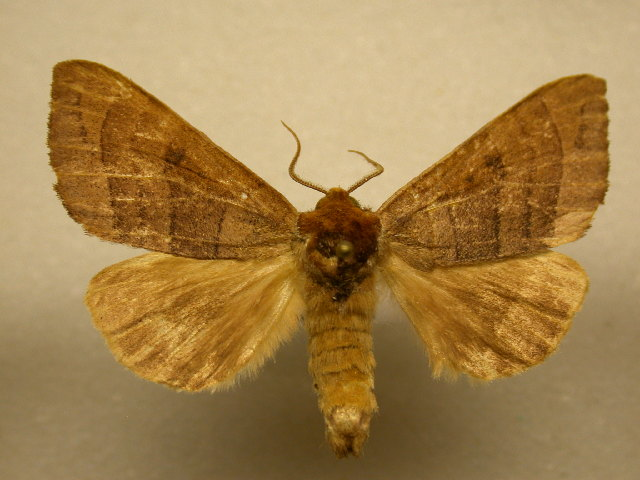

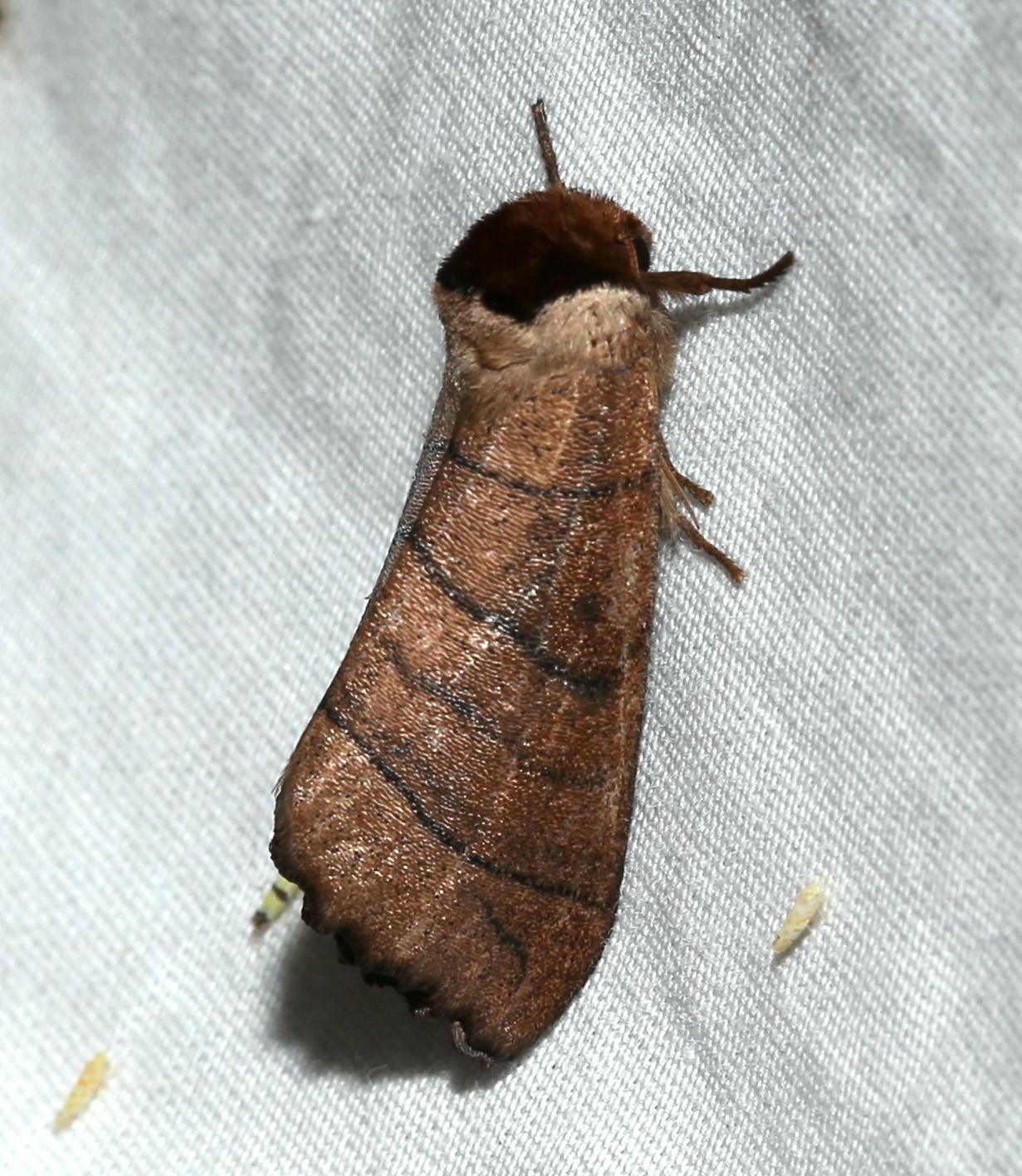

Scientific classification
- Kingdom: Animalia
- Phylum: Arthropoda
- Class: Insecta
- Order: Lepidoptera
- Superfamily: Noctuoidea
- Family: Notodontidae
- Genus: Datana
- Species: D. angusii

Binomial name
- Datana angusii Grote & Robinson, 1866

= Datana angusii =

Species of moth

Datana angusii, or Angus's datana moth, is a species of moth in the family Notodontidae (the prominents). It was first described by Augustus Radcliffe Grote and Coleman Townsend Robinson in 1866 and it is found in North America.

The MONA or Hodges number for Datana angusii is 7903.
