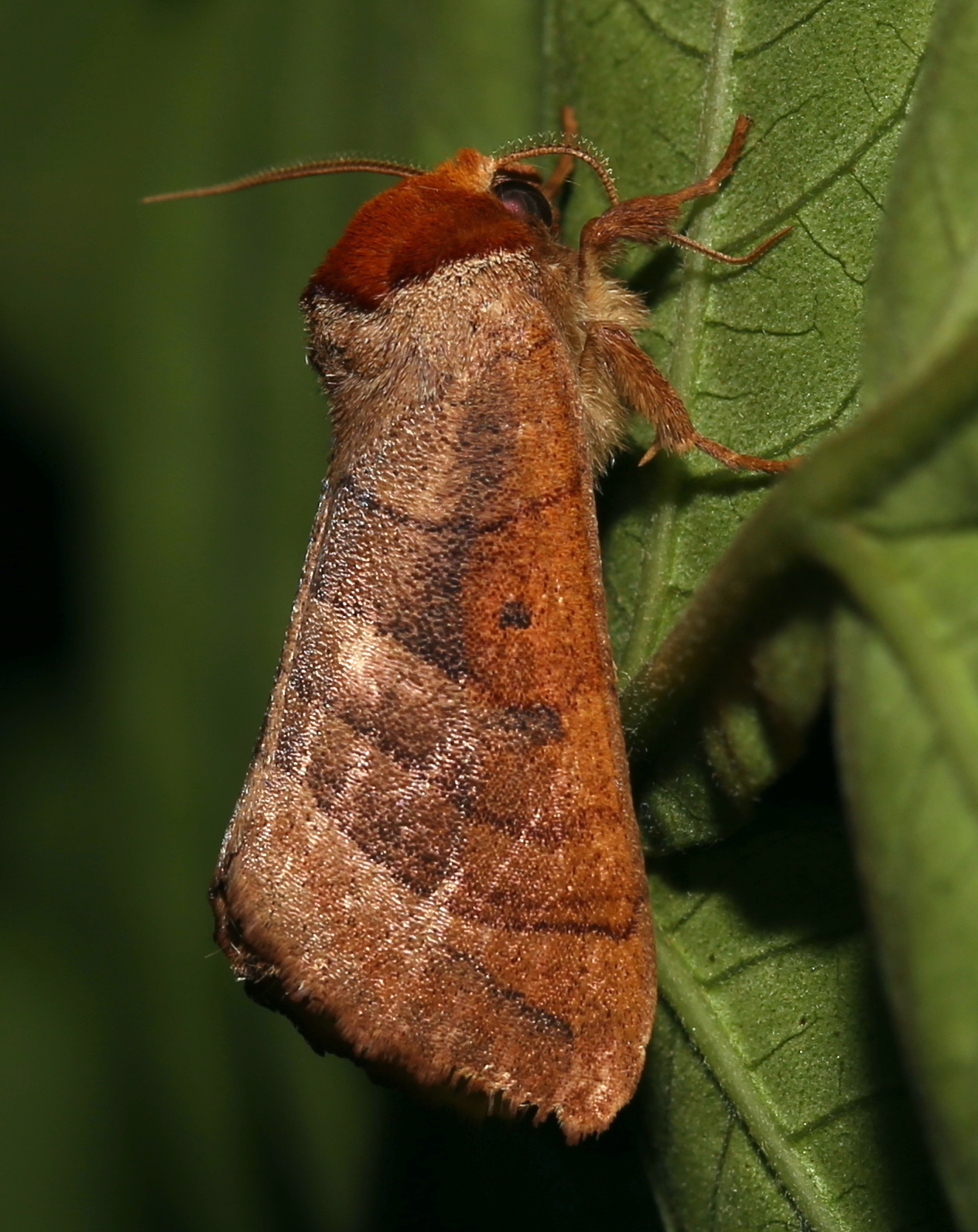

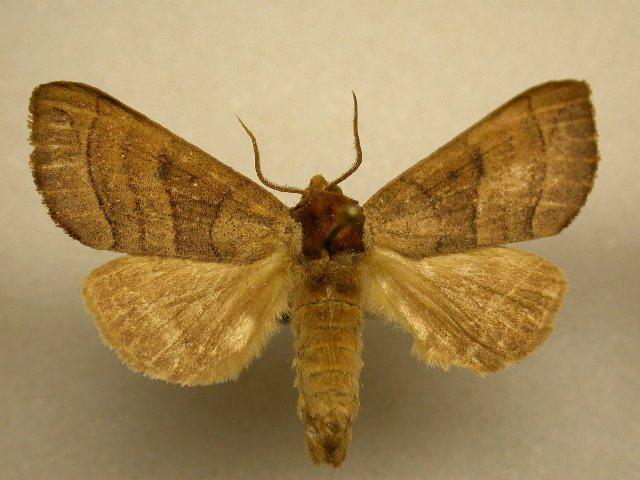

Scientific classification
- Kingdom: Animalia
- Phylum: Arthropoda
- Clade: Pancrustacea
- Class: Insecta
- Order: Lepidoptera
- Superfamily: Noctuoidea
- Family: Notodontidae
- Genus: Datana
- Species: D. drexelii

Binomial name
- Datana drexelii H. Edwards, 1884

= Datana drexelii =

Species of moth

Datana drexelii, commonly known as Drexel's datana, is a species of prominent moth in the family Notodontidae. It is found in North America.
