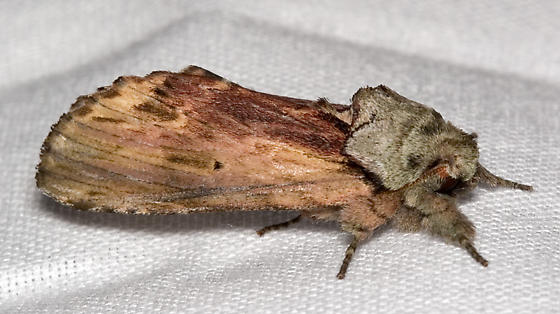

Scientific classification
- Kingdom: Animalia
- Phylum: Arthropoda
- Clade: Pancrustacea
- Class: Insecta
- Order: Lepidoptera
- Superfamily: Noctuoidea
- Family: Notodontidae
- Genus: Oligocentria
- Species: O. semirufescens

Binomial name
- Oligocentria semirufescens (Walker, 1865)

Synonyms
- Hatima semirufescens Walker, 1865; Oligocentria eximia (Grote, 1881)

= Oligocentria semirufescens =

Species of moth

Oligocentria semirufescens, the red-washed prominent moth or rusty prominent, is a moth of the family Notodontidae. The species was first described by Francis Walker in 1865. It is found in North America from Nova Scotia west to Vancouver Island, south to Florida, Colorado and central California.

Western populations of O. semirufescens are paler and greyer than those from eastern Canada, and superficially resemble the southern Oligocentria perangulata.

The wingspan is 30–45 mm. Adults are on wing from May to September, but from June through early August in Alberta.

The larvae feed on various trees and shrubs, including apple, beech, birch, poplar, oak, maple, rose and willow.
