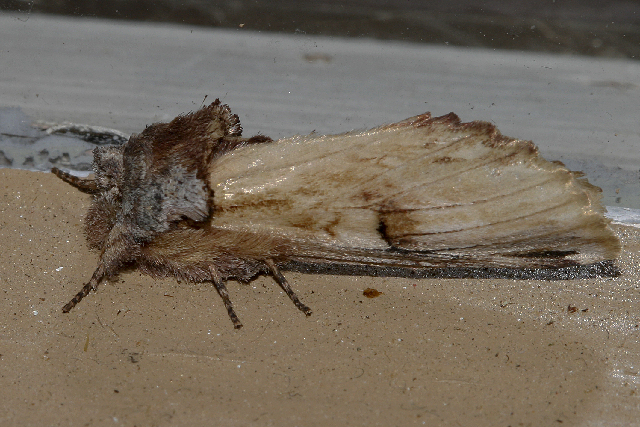

Scientific classification
- Kingdom: Animalia
- Phylum: Arthropoda
- Clade: Pancrustacea
- Class: Insecta
- Order: Lepidoptera
- Superfamily: Noctuoidea
- Family: Notodontidae
- Genus: Oligocentria
- Species: O. pallida

Binomial name
- Oligocentria pallida (Strecker, 1899)

= Oligocentria pallida =

Species of moth

Oligocentria pallida, the pale prominent, is a species of moth in the family Notodontidae (the prominents). It was first described by Strecker in 1899 and it is found in North America.

The MONA or Hodges number for Oligocentria pallida is 8014.
