= Dicentria violascens =

Scientific classification
- Kingdom: Animalia
- Phylum: Arthropoda
- Clade: Pancrustacea
- Class: Insecta
- Order: Lepidoptera
- Superfamily: Noctuoidea
- Family: Notodontidae
- Genus: Dicentria
- Species: D. violascens

Binomial name
- Dicentria violascens (Herrich-Schäffer, 1855)

Synonyms
- Notodonta violascens Herrich-Schäffer, [1855]; Oligocentria violascens; Janassa laciniosa H. Edwards, 1885; Oligocentria laciniosa; Oligocentria brunneipennis Kaye, 1922; Dicentria phraortes Druce, 1889

Species of moth

Dicentria violascens is a moth of the family Notodontidae. It has been recorded from Mexico south to Brazil. However, violascens is a species complex of at least six cryptic species.
