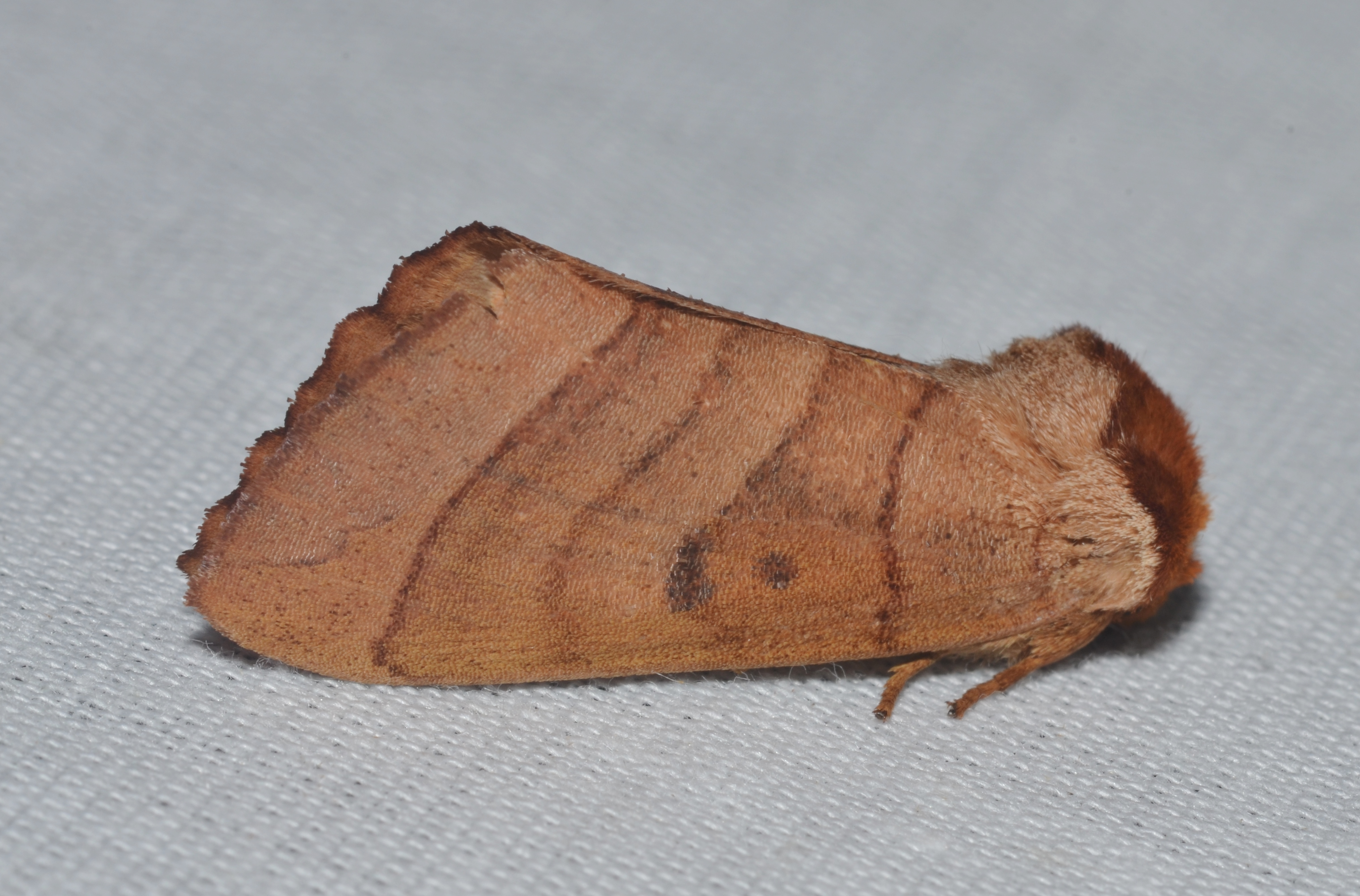

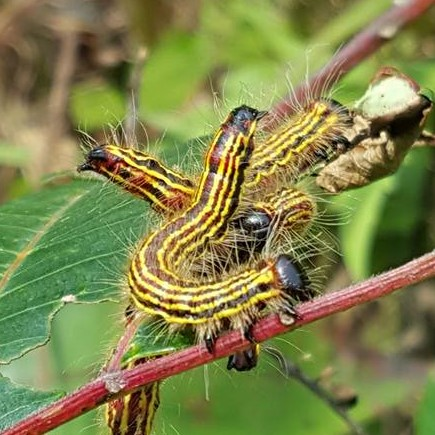
- Adult (top) and larva (bottom)

Scientific classification
- Kingdom: Animalia
- Phylum: Arthropoda
- Clade: Pancrustacea
- Class: Insecta
- Order: Lepidoptera
- Superfamily: Noctuoidea
- Family: Notodontidae
- Genus: Datana
- Species: D. perspicua

Binomial name
- Datana perspicua Grote & Robinson, 1865

= Datana perspicua =

Species of moth

Datana perspicua, the spotted datana, is a species of prominent moth in the family Notodontidae. It was described by Augustus Radcliffe Grote and Coleman Townsend Robinson in 1865 and is found in North America.

== Subspecies ==
- Datana perspicua mesillae Cockerell, 1897
- Datana perspicua opposita Barnes & Benjamin, 1927
- Datana perspicua perspicua Grote & Robinson, 1865
