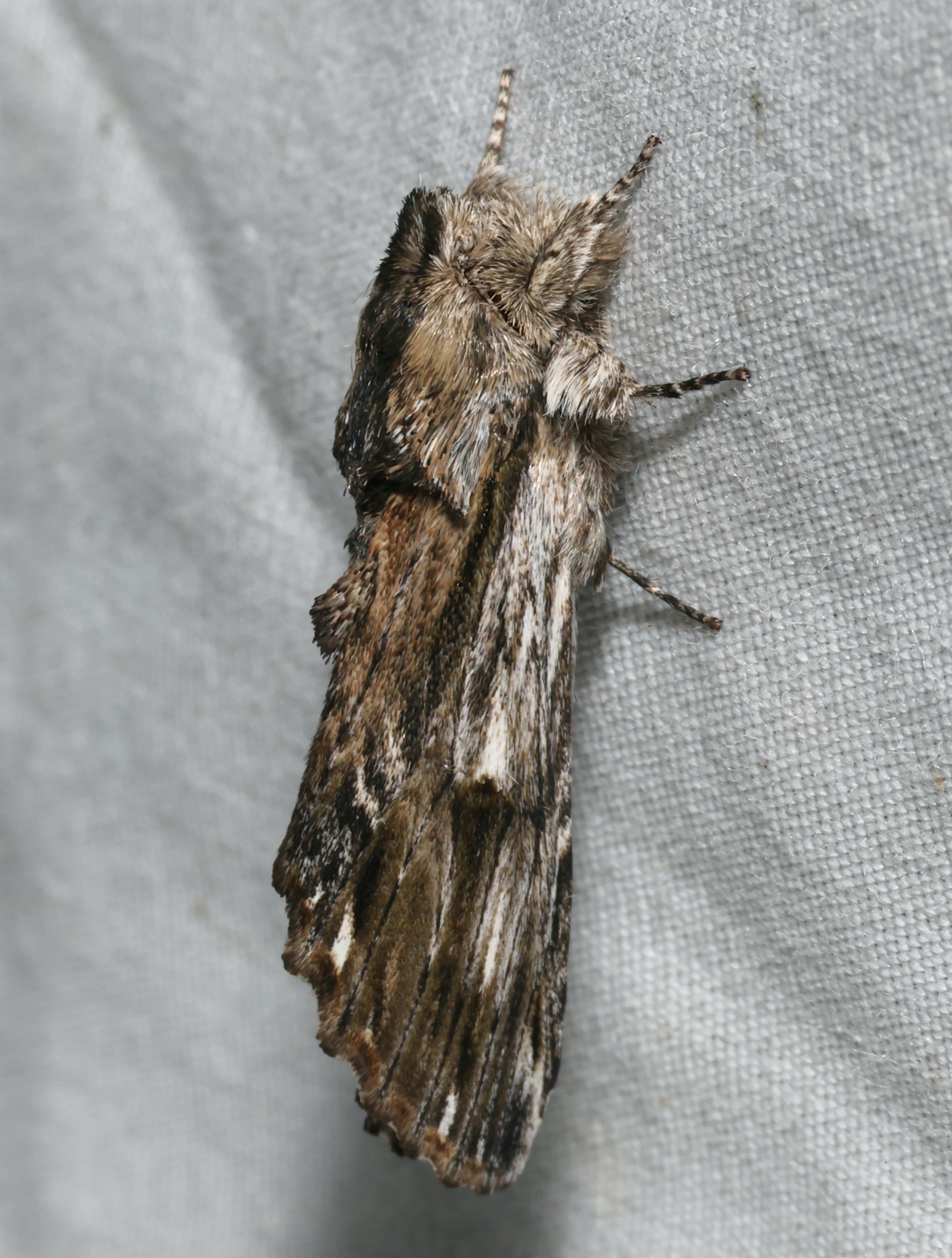
- Adult
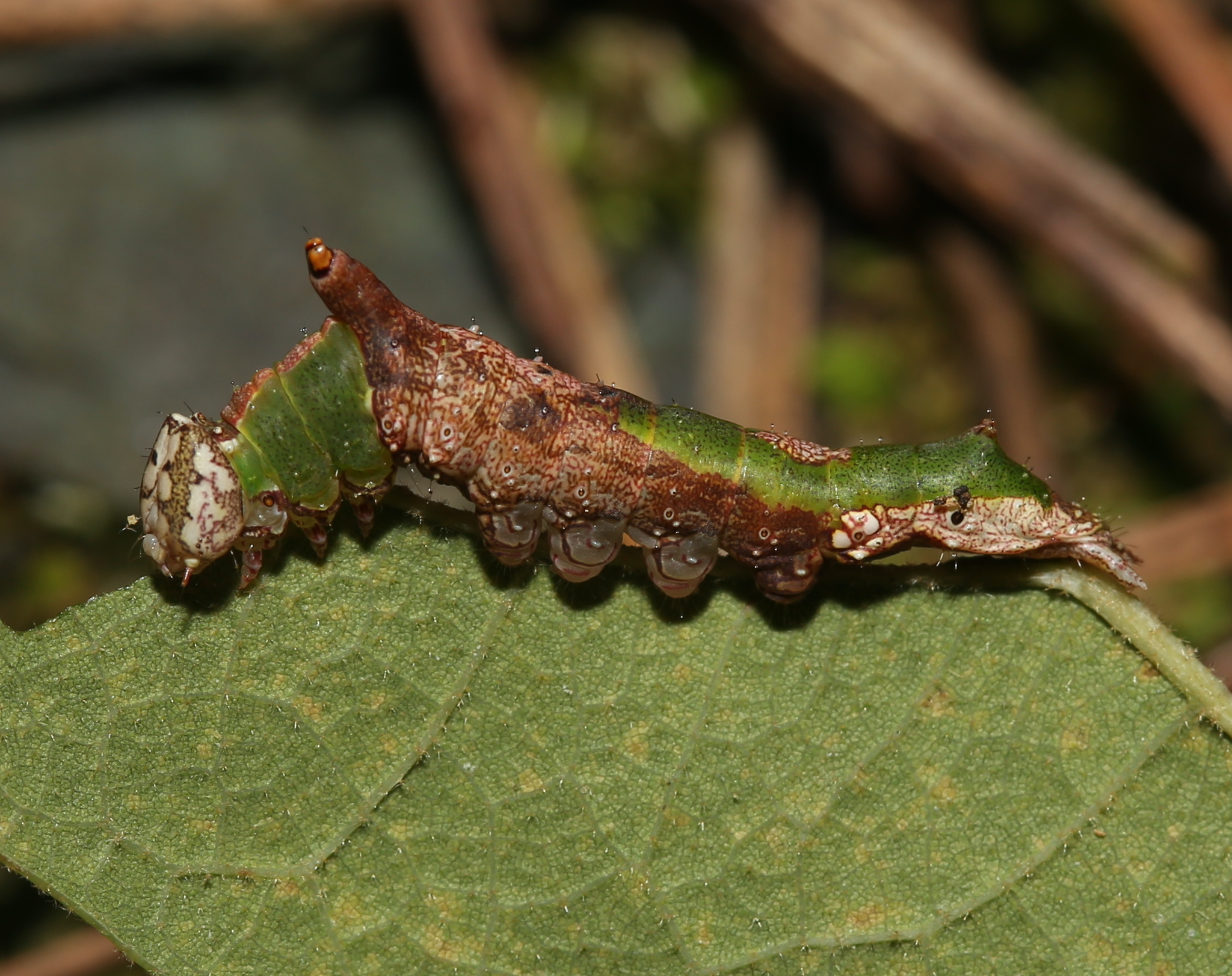
- Larva on White Oak

Scientific classification
- Kingdom: Animalia
- Phylum: Arthropoda
- Clade: Pancrustacea
- Class: Insecta
- Order: Lepidoptera
- Superfamily: Noctuoidea
- Family: Notodontidae
- Genus: Oligocentria
- Species: O. lignicolor

Binomial name
- Oligocentria lignicolor (Walker, 1855)

Synonyms
- Ianassa lignicolor Walker, 1855; Oligocentria lignigera; Xylinodes virgata Packard, 1864

= Oligocentria lignicolor =

Species of moth

Oligocentria lignicolor, the white-streaked prominent moth or lacecapped caterpillar, is a moth of the family Notodontidae. It is found in North America, including Connecticut, Georgia, Illinois, Louisiana, Massachusetts, Mississippi, Missouri, Manitoba, New Brunswick, Nova Scotia, New Jersey, New York, North Carolina, Oklahoma and Pennsylvania.

The wingspan is about 38 mm.

The larvae feed on the leaves of Fagus, Castanea and Quercus species.

== Gallery ==
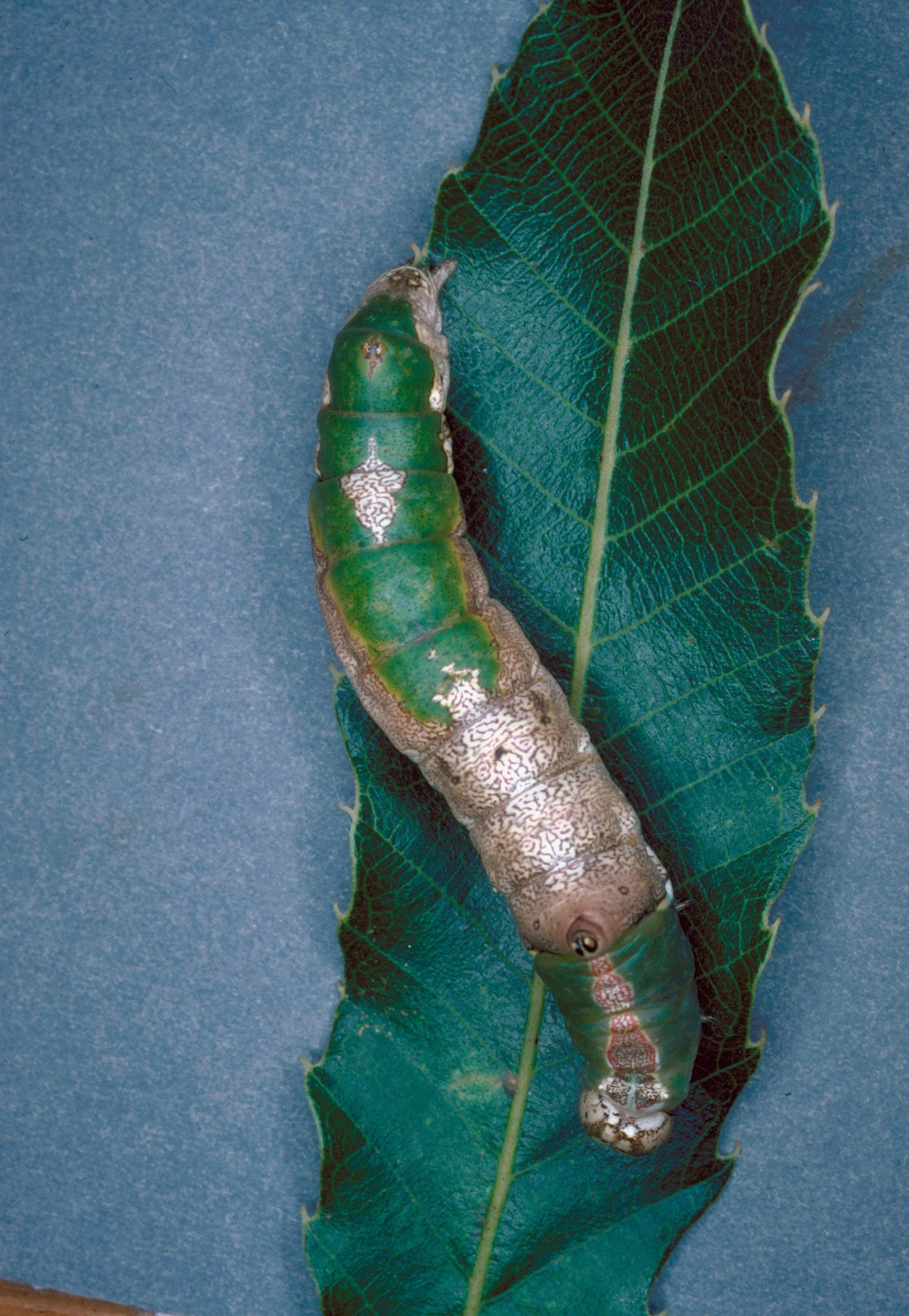
Larva

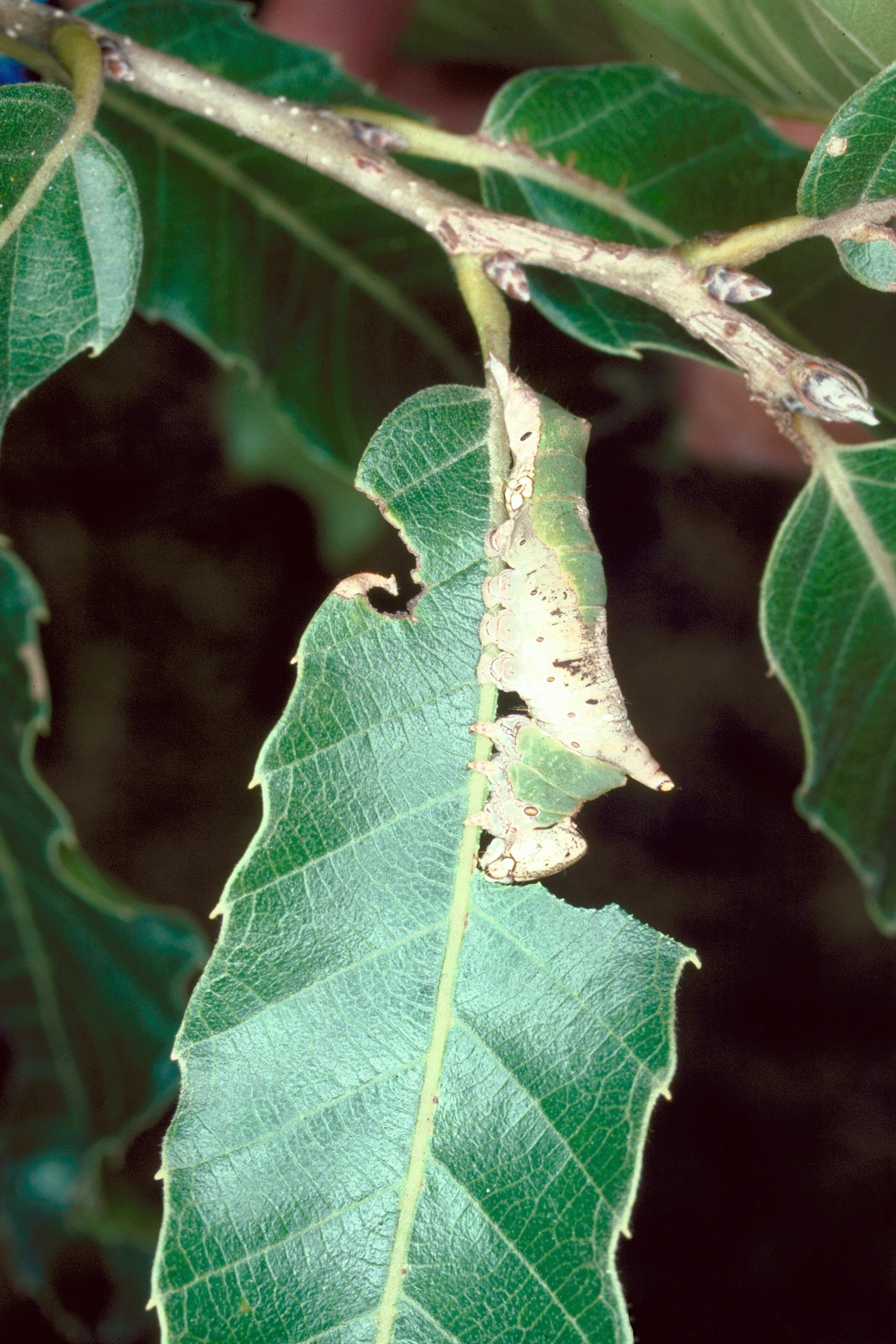
Damage
