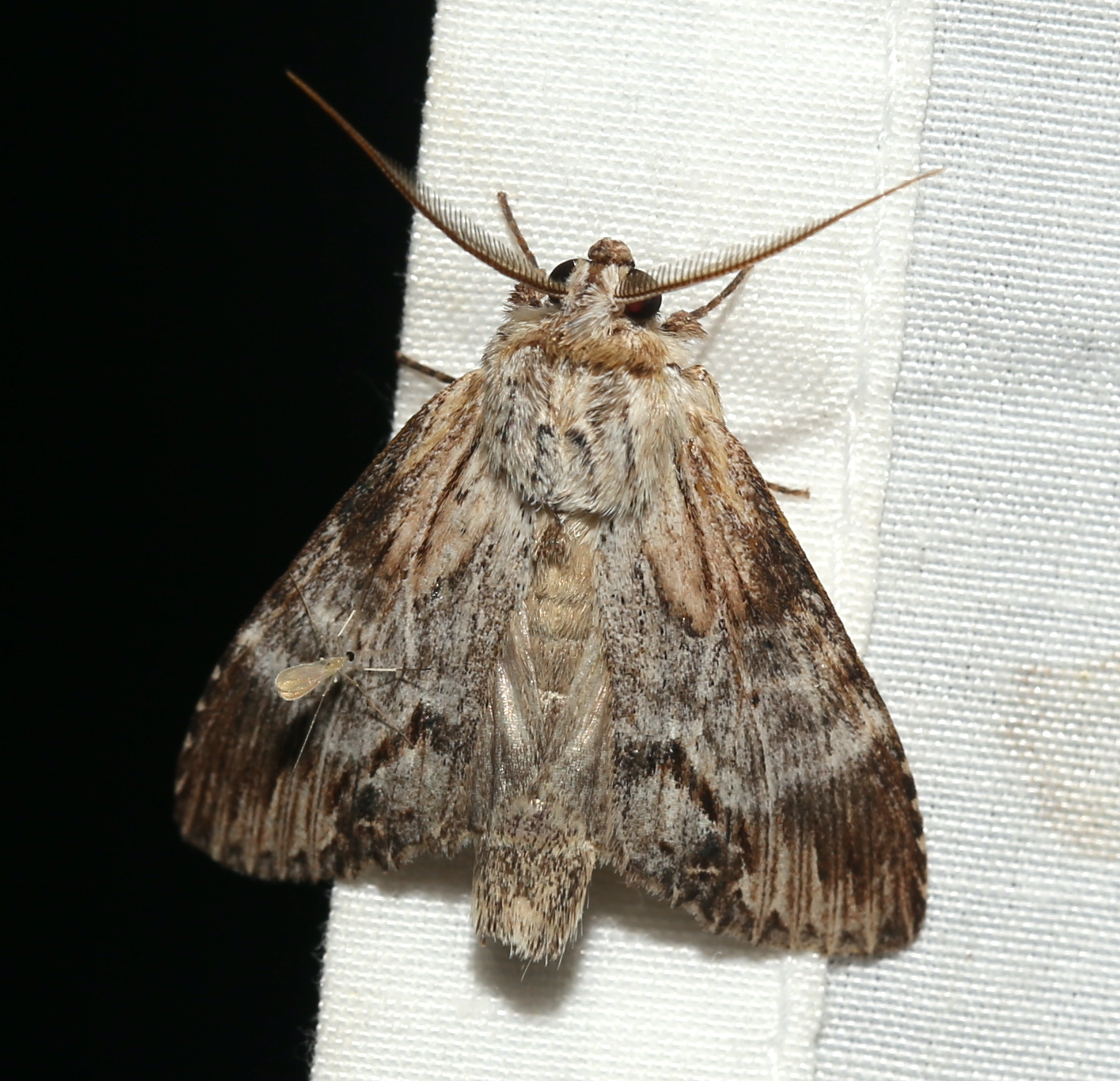

Scientific classification
- Kingdom: Animalia
- Phylum: Arthropoda
- Clade: Pancrustacea
- Class: Insecta
- Order: Lepidoptera
- Superfamily: Noctuoidea
- Family: Notodontidae
- Genus: Dasylophia
- Species: D. thyatiroides

Binomial name
- Dasylophia thyatiroides (Walker, 1862)

= Dasylophia thyatiroides =

Species of moth

Dasylophia thyatiroides, the gray-patched prominent, is a species of prominent moth in the family Notodontidae. It was described by Francis Walker in 1862 and is found in North America.

The MONA or Hodges number for Dasylophia thyatiroides is 7958.
