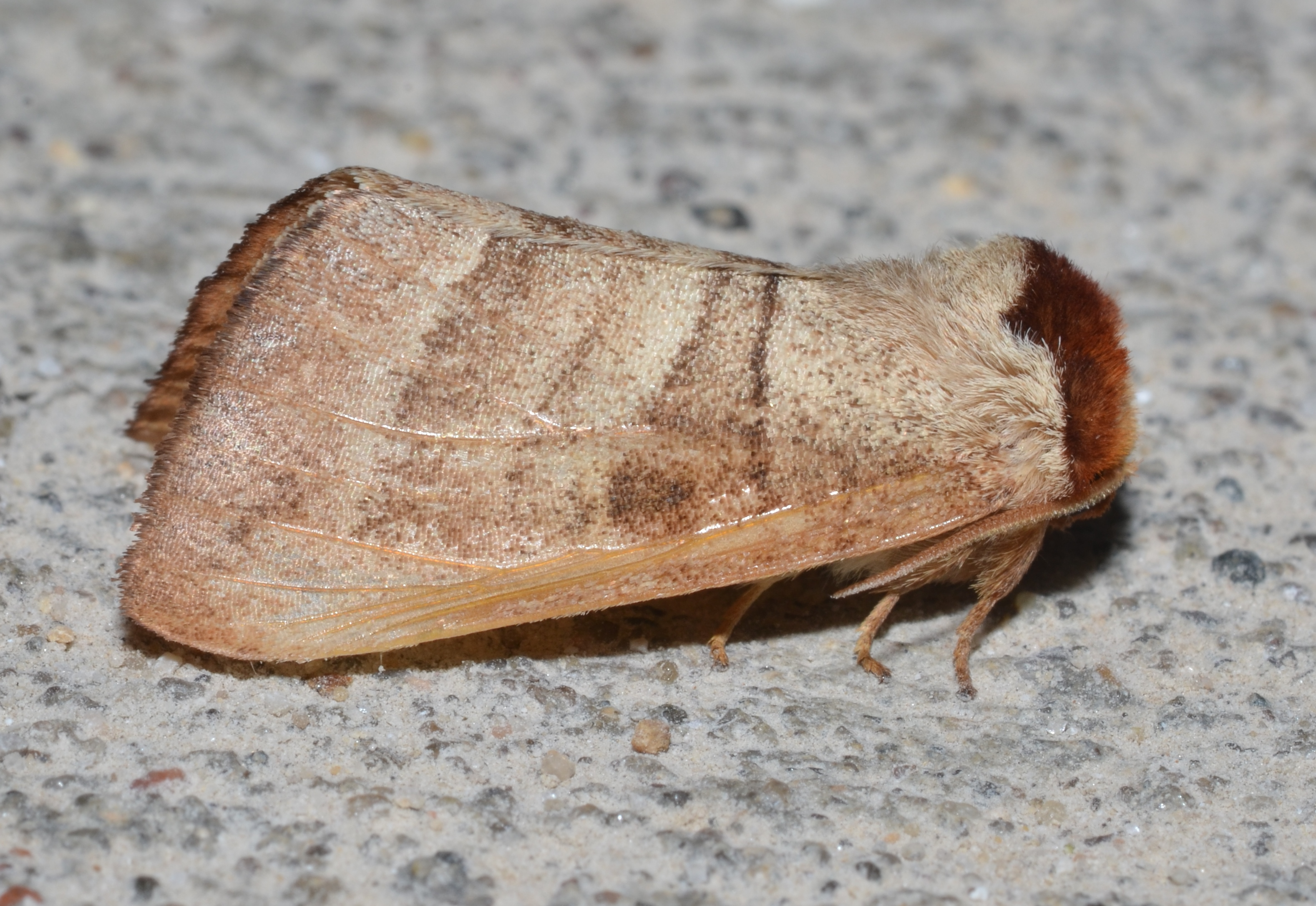

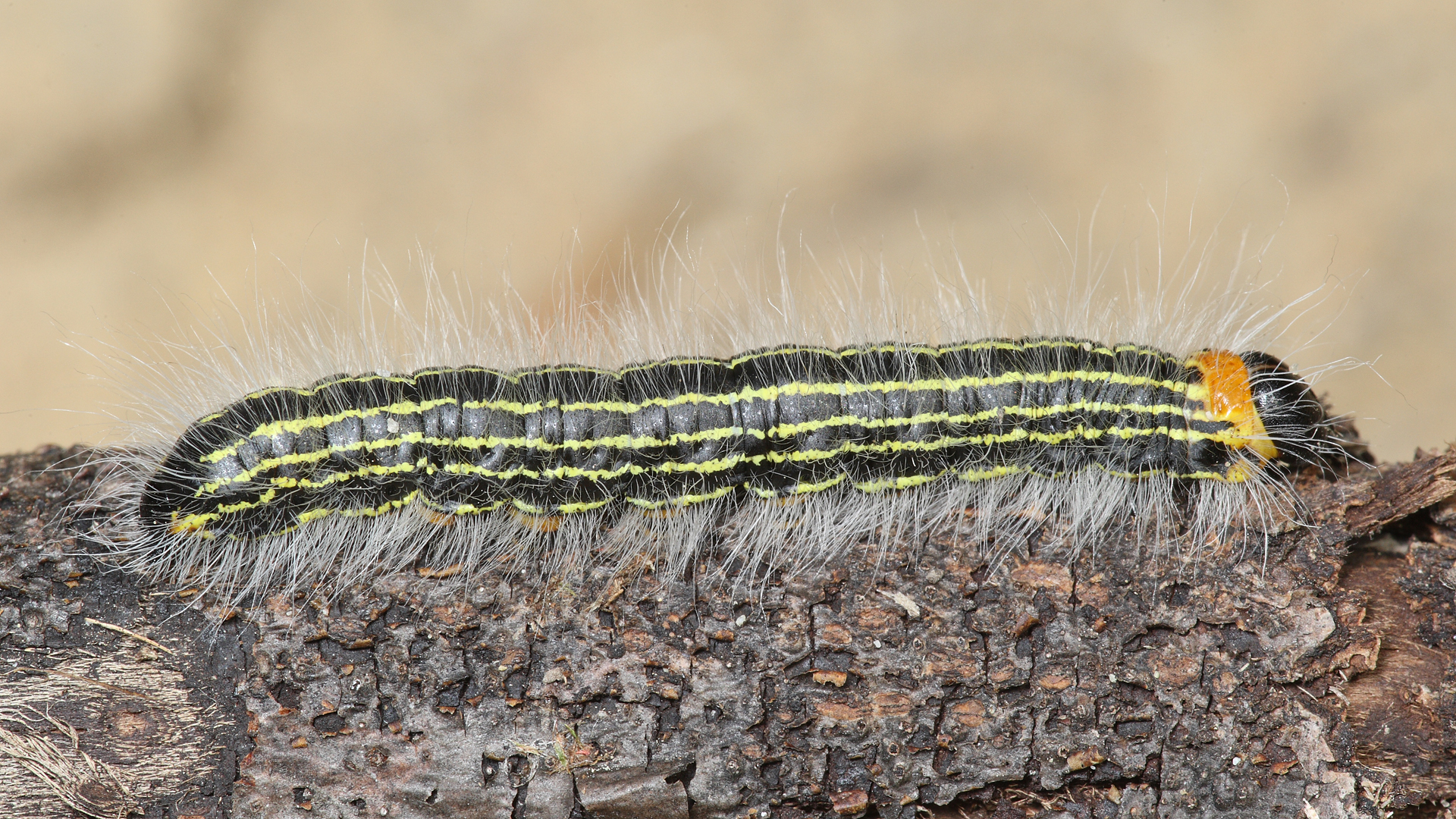
- Adult (top) and larva (bottom)

Scientific classification
- Kingdom: Animalia
- Phylum: Arthropoda
- Class: Insecta
- Order: Lepidoptera
- Superfamily: Noctuoidea
- Family: Notodontidae
- Genus: Datana
- Species: D. contracta

Binomial name
- Datana contracta Walker, 1855

= Datana contracta =

Contracted datana

Species of moth

Datana contracta, the contracted datana, is a species of moth in the family Notodontidae. It is found from Maine to Florida and west to Arkansas and Wisconsin.

The wingspan is 35–50 mm.

The larvae have been recorded feeding on the foliage of blueberries, hickories, oaks, sycamore, and witch-hazel. In Alabama, it has been found on water, laurel and sawtooth oaks.
