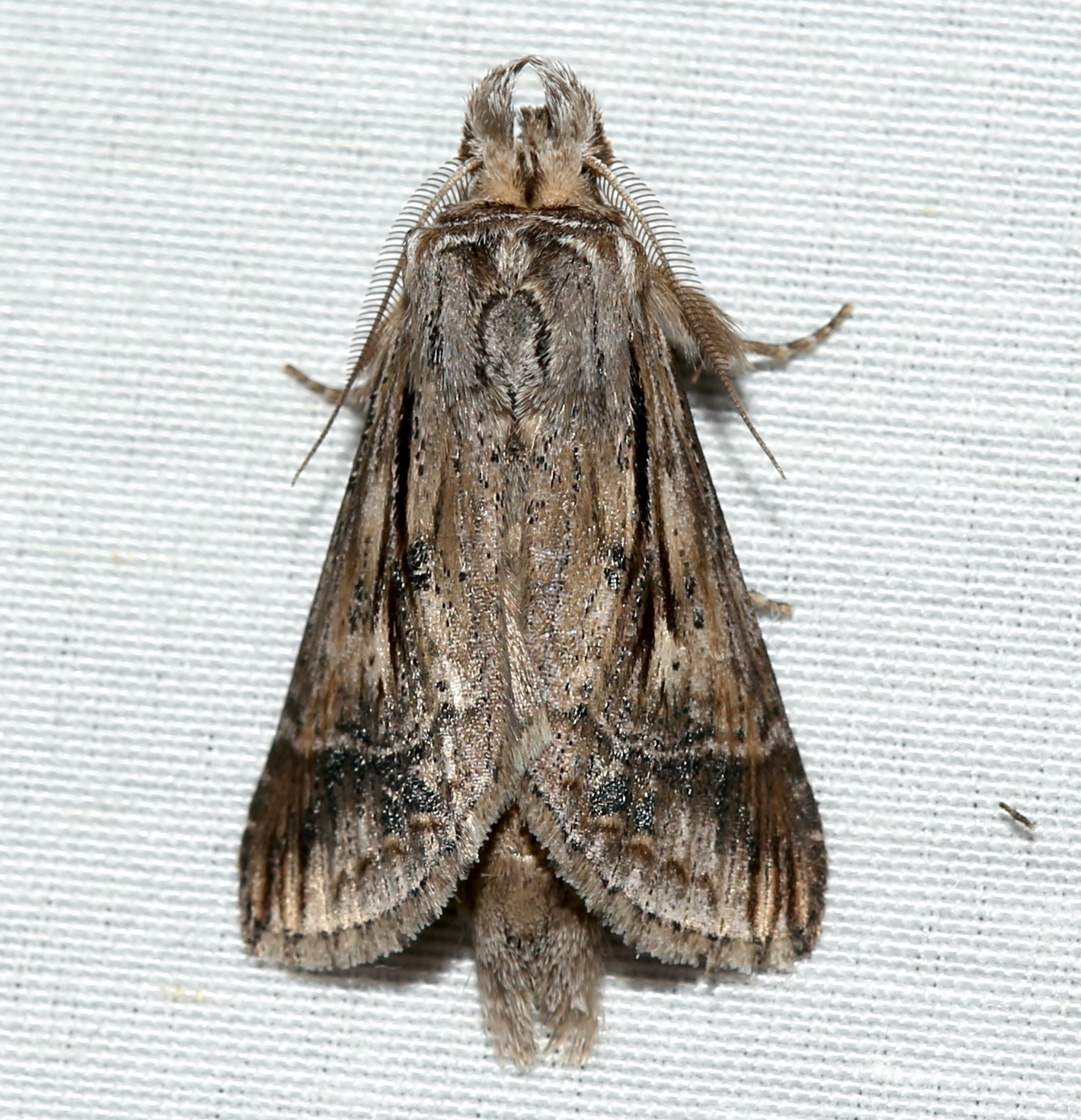
- Adult
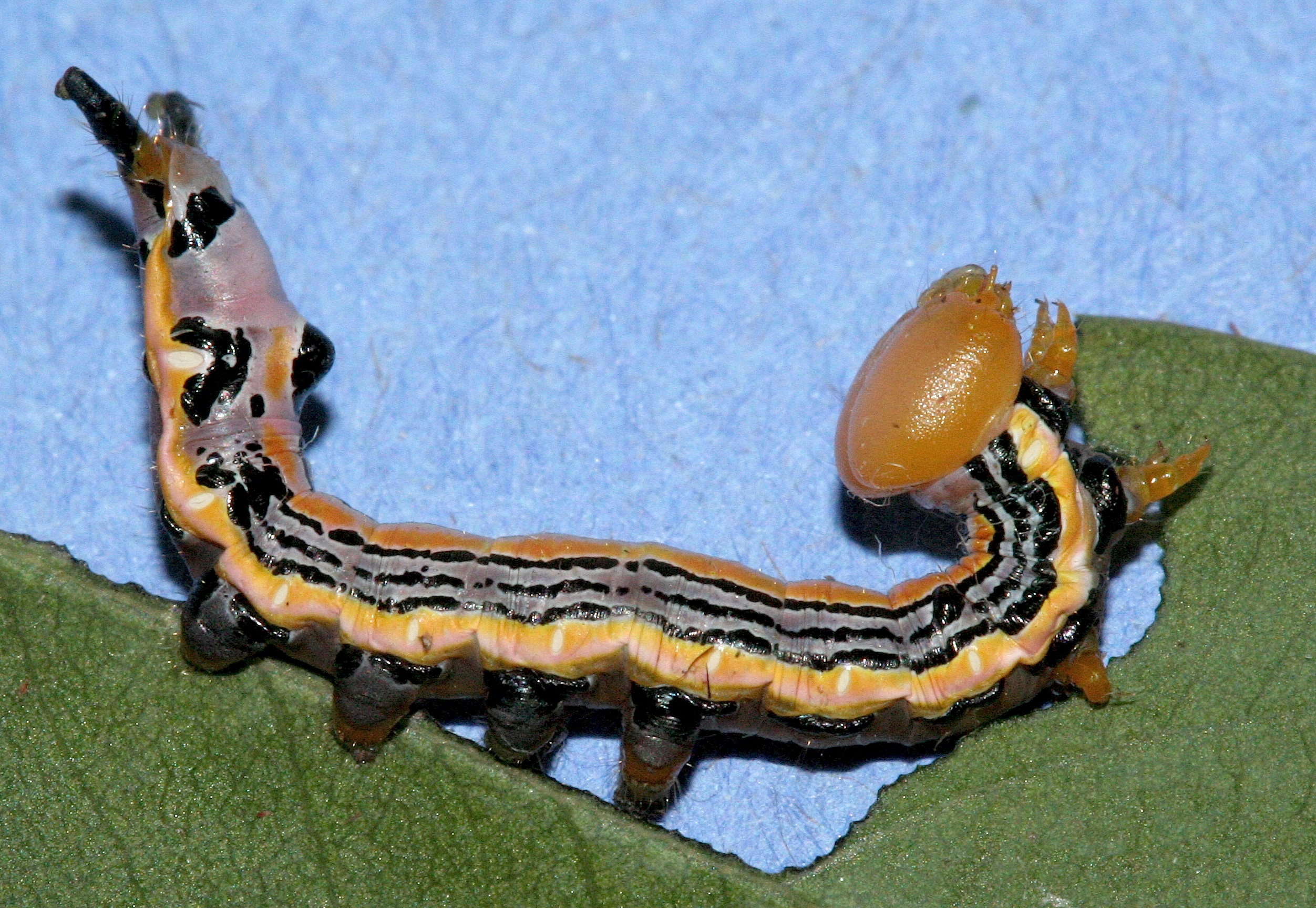
- Caterpillar

Scientific classification
- Kingdom: Animalia
- Phylum: Arthropoda
- Class: Insecta
- Order: Lepidoptera
- Superfamily: Noctuoidea
- Family: Notodontidae
- Genus: Dasylophia
- Species: D. anguina

Binomial name
- Dasylophia anguina (J.E. Smith, 1797)

Synonyms
- Phalaena anguina Smith, 1797; Dasylophia cucullifera (Herrich-Schäffer, 1855); Dasylophia punctata (Walker, 1865); Dasylophia signata (Walker, 1865); Dasylophia cana (Walker, 1869); Dasylophia punctagorda Slosson, 1892

= Dasylophia anguina =

Black-spotted prominent

Species of moth

Dasylophia anguina, the black-spotted prominent, is a species of moth in the family Notodontidae. It is native to North America.

== Description ==
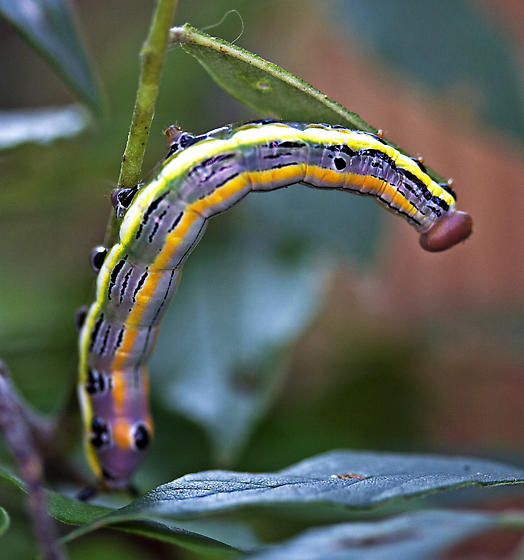
Black-spotted prominent caterpillar on Wisteria

The black-spotted prominent has a wingspan of 3 to 4.1 cm (1.2 to 1.6 in). It is sexually dimorphic, with the male having black streaks in the basal and median areas of the fore wing, and the female having a large yellow-brown patch in the basal area of the fore wing. The hind wing is white in the male, and gray in the female. Both sexes have the fore wing postmedian line being sharp and rounded. There are black spots in the lower marginal area of the fore wing.

== Range and distribution ==
The black-spotted prominent is found from Manitoba to southern Quebec to southern Florida and to northeastern Texas.

== Habitat ==
The black-spotted prominent can be found in habitats such as fields, woodlands, and barrens.

== Flight period ==
The black-spotted prominent flies from April to September, and the caterpillars can be found from May to November. There is one brood in the northern part of its range, and two or more in the southern part of its range.
