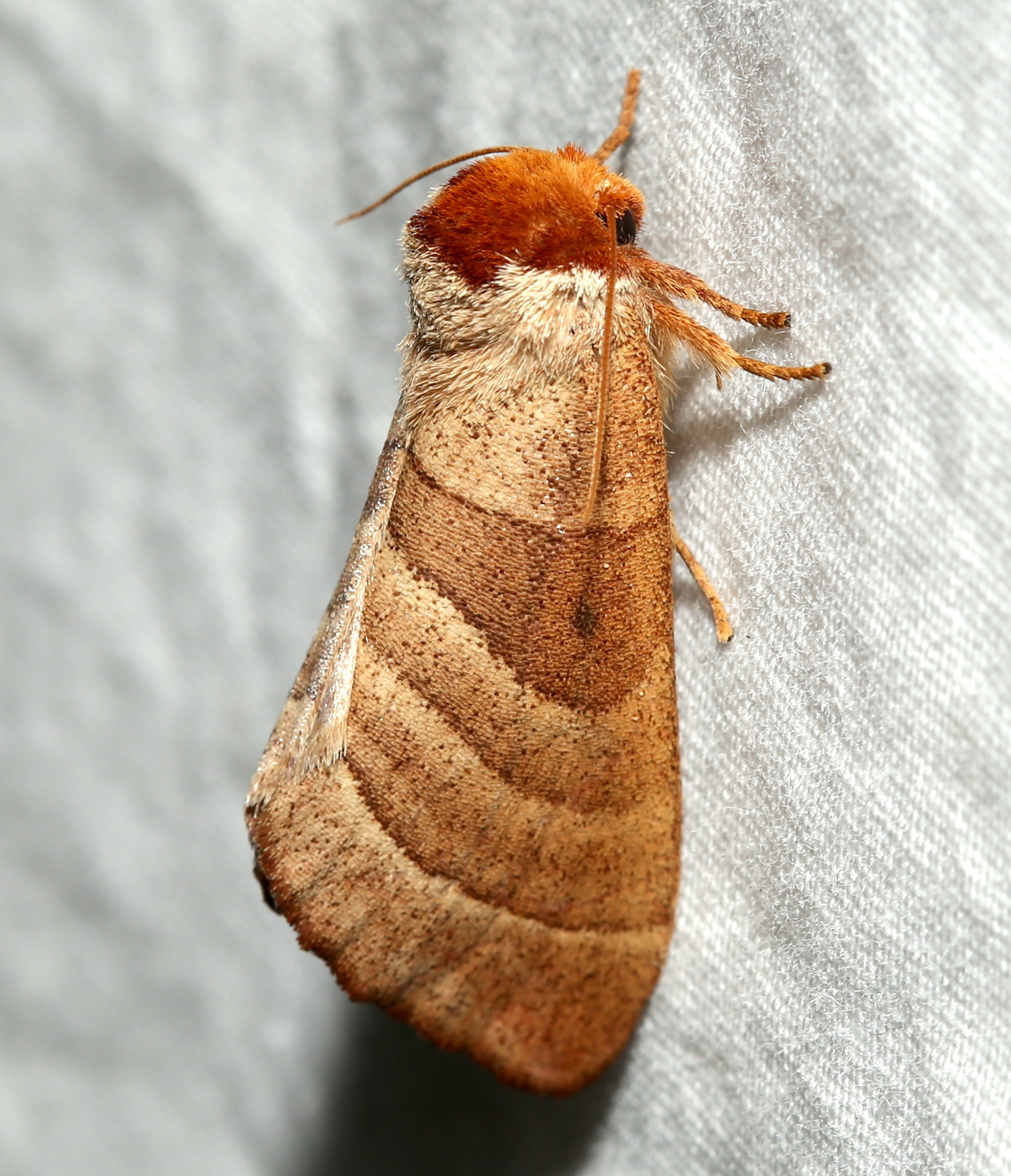

Scientific classification
- Kingdom: Animalia
- Phylum: Arthropoda
- Class: Insecta
- Order: Lepidoptera
- Superfamily: Noctuoidea
- Family: Notodontidae
- Genus: Datana
- Species: D. integerrima

Binomial name
- Datana integerrima Grote & Robinson, 1866

= Datana integerrima =

Walnut caterpillar moth

Species of moth

Datana integerrima, the walnut caterpillar moth, is a moth of the family Notodontidae. It is found in eastern North America, from Ontario, through most of the Eastern States west to Minnesota and south to northern Mexico.

The wingspan is 35–50 mm. Adults are on wing from May to August.

The larvae feed on Carya, Juglans, Salix and Quercus species, Gleditsia triacanthos and some shrubs.
