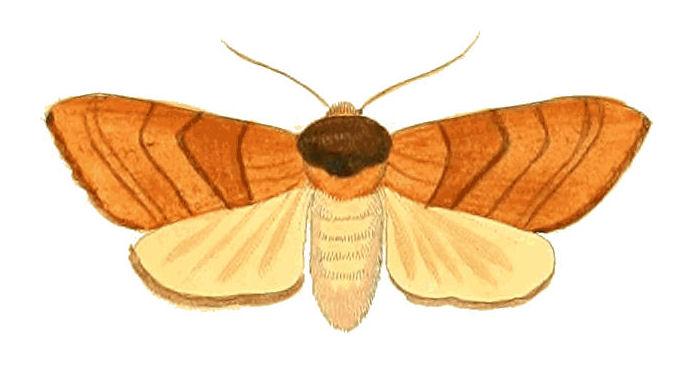

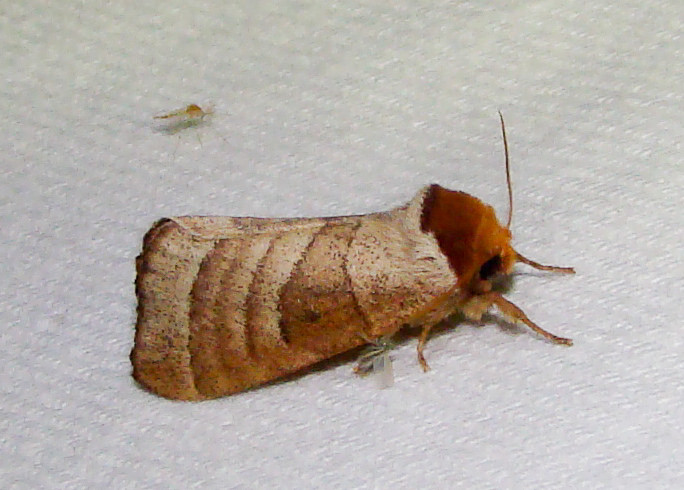

Scientific classification
- Domain: Eukaryota
- Kingdom: Animalia
- Phylum: Arthropoda
- Class: Insecta
- Order: Lepidoptera
- Superfamily: Noctuoidea
- Family: Notodontidae
- Genus: Datana
- Species: D. ministra

Binomial name
- Datana ministra (Drury, 1773)

Synonyms
- Phalaena ministra Drury, 1773; Datana ruficollis Walker, 1862

= Datana ministra =

Yellownecked caterpillar

Species of moth

Datana ministra, the yellownecked caterpillar, is a moth of the family Notodontidae. It is found in southern Canada and the United States east of the Rocky Mountains, in the south-west it ranges to California.

The wingspan is about 42 mm. There is one generation per year.

The larvae feed on Malus, Quercus, Betula and Salix species.

== Subspecies ==
- Datana ministra ministra
- Datana ministra californica Dyar, 1890

== Gallery ==
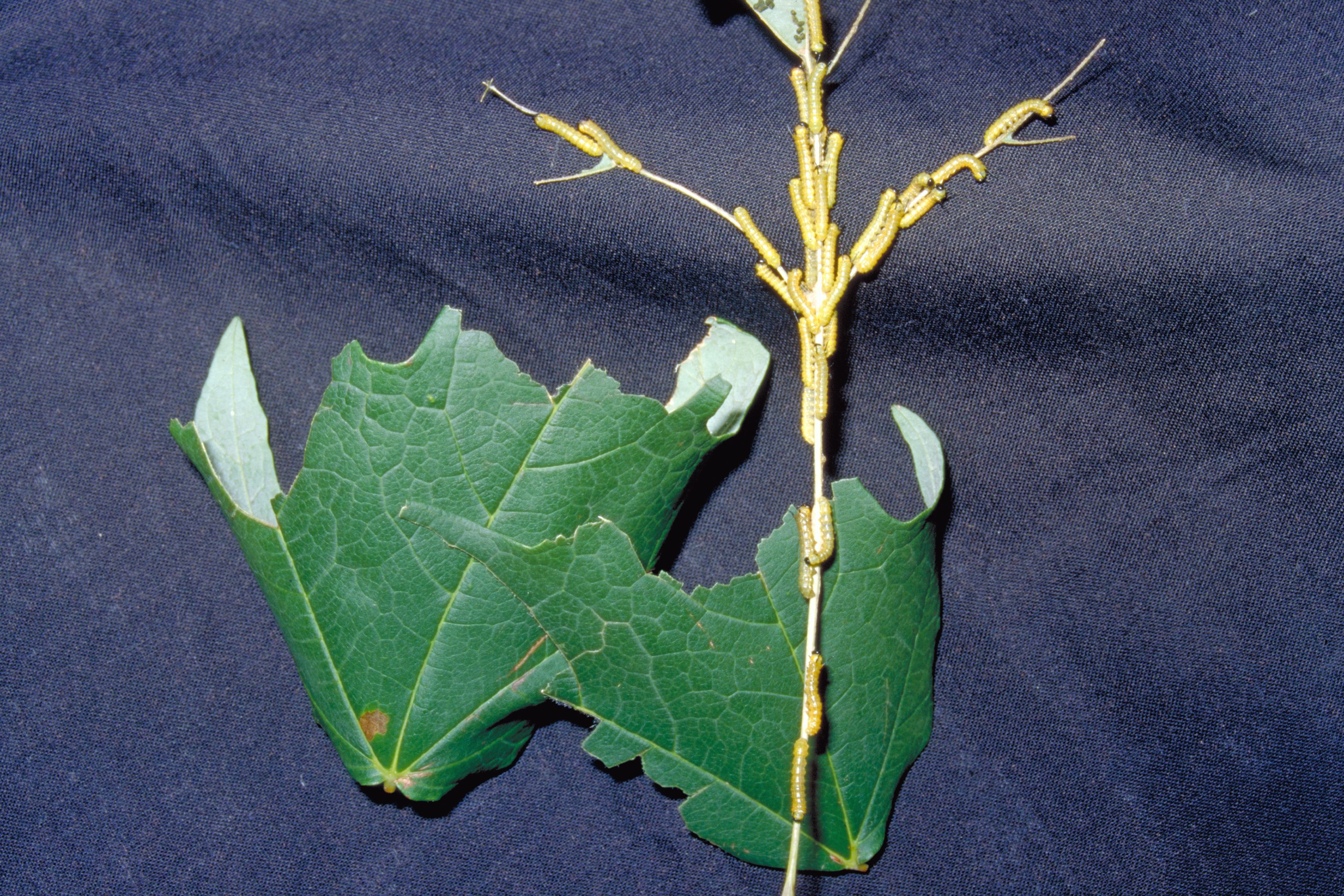
Larva

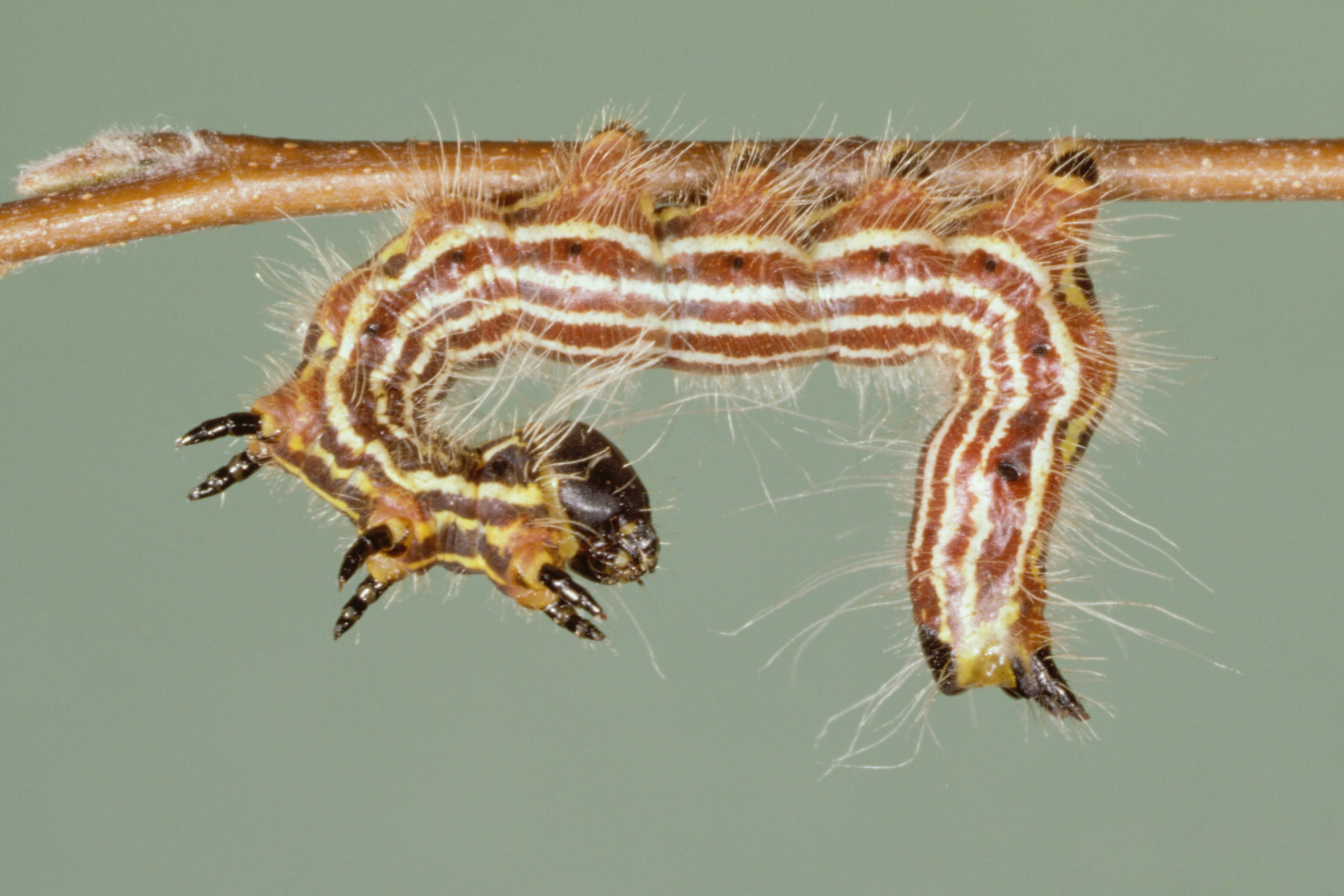
Larva

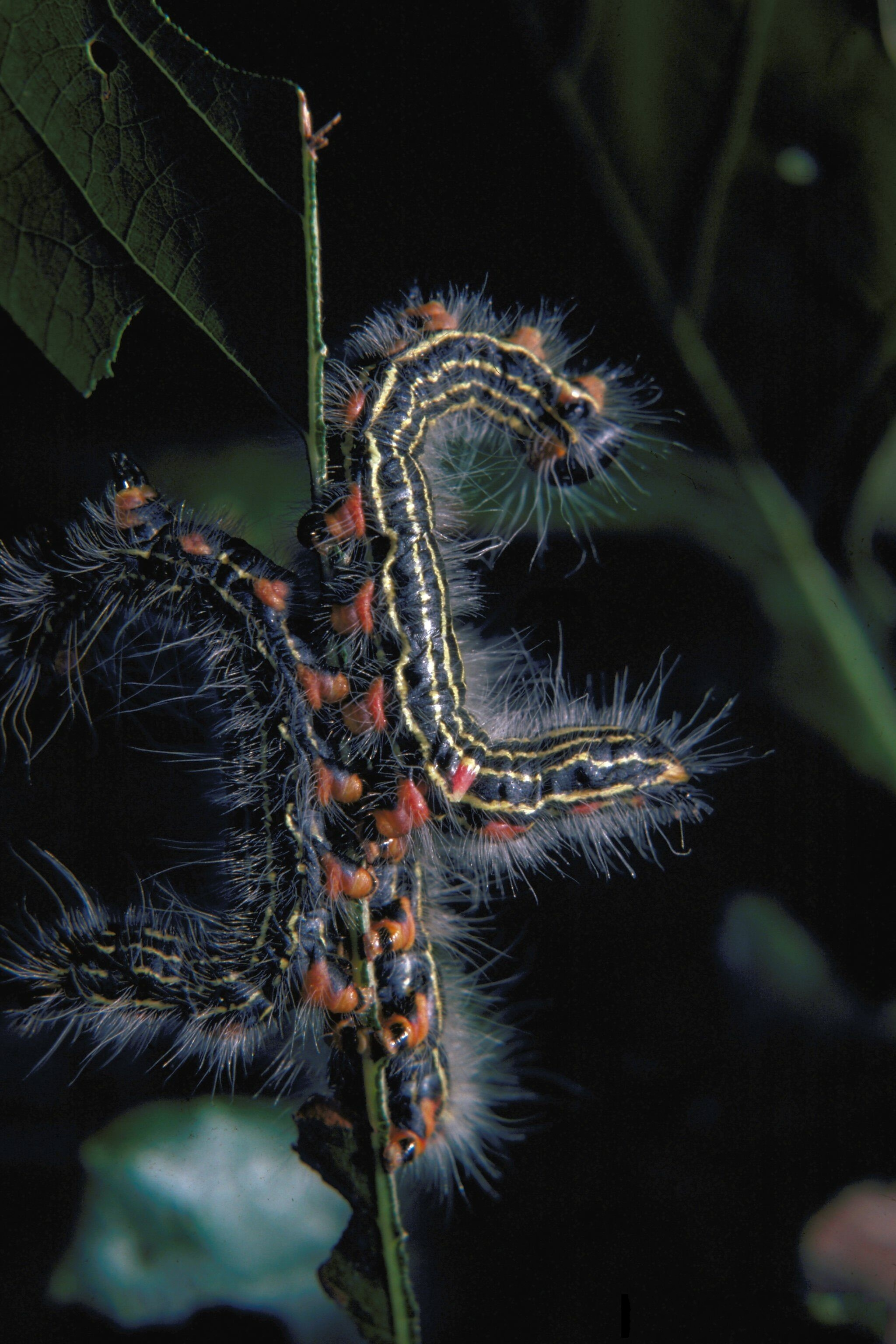
Larva

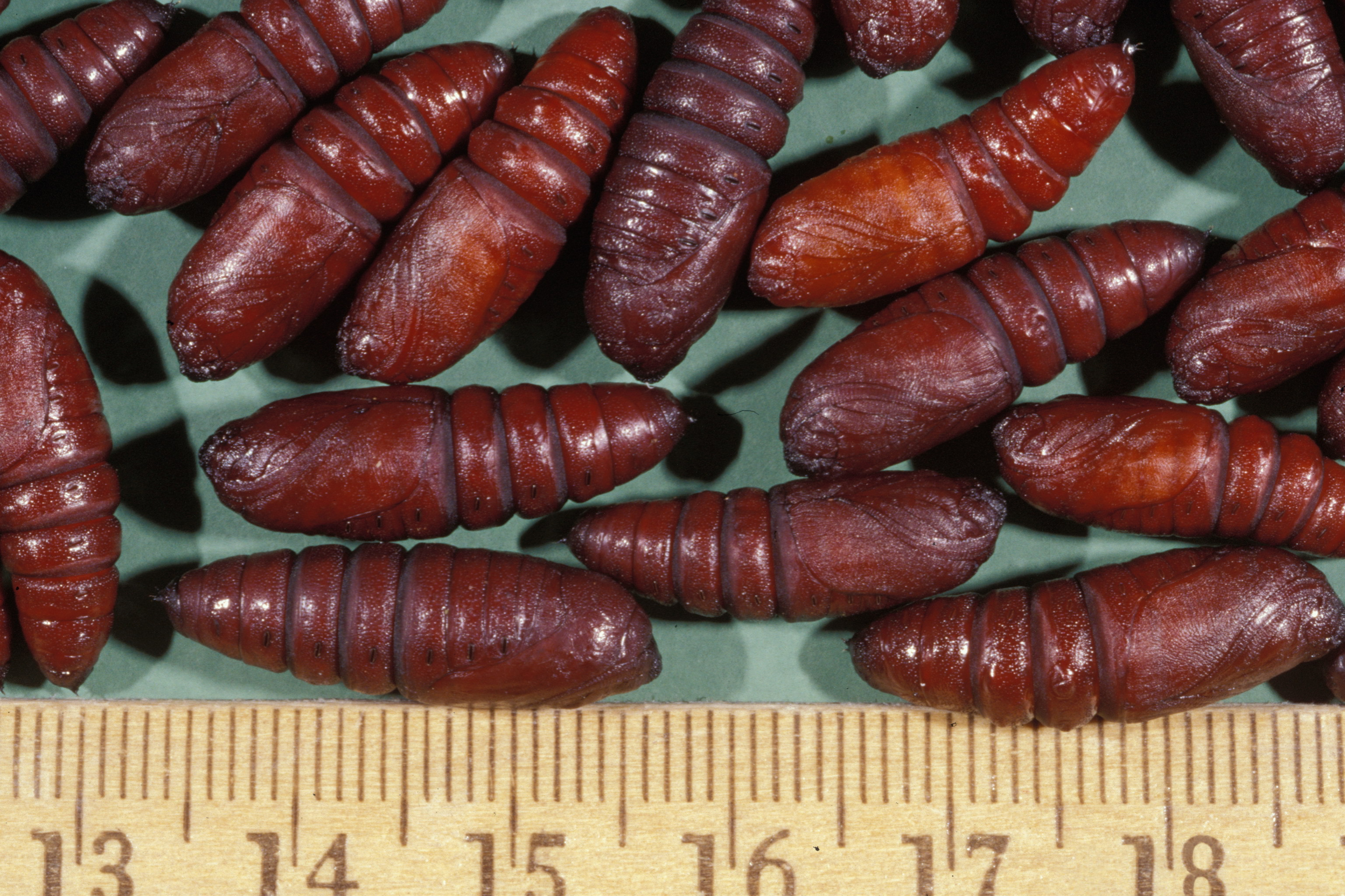
Pupa
