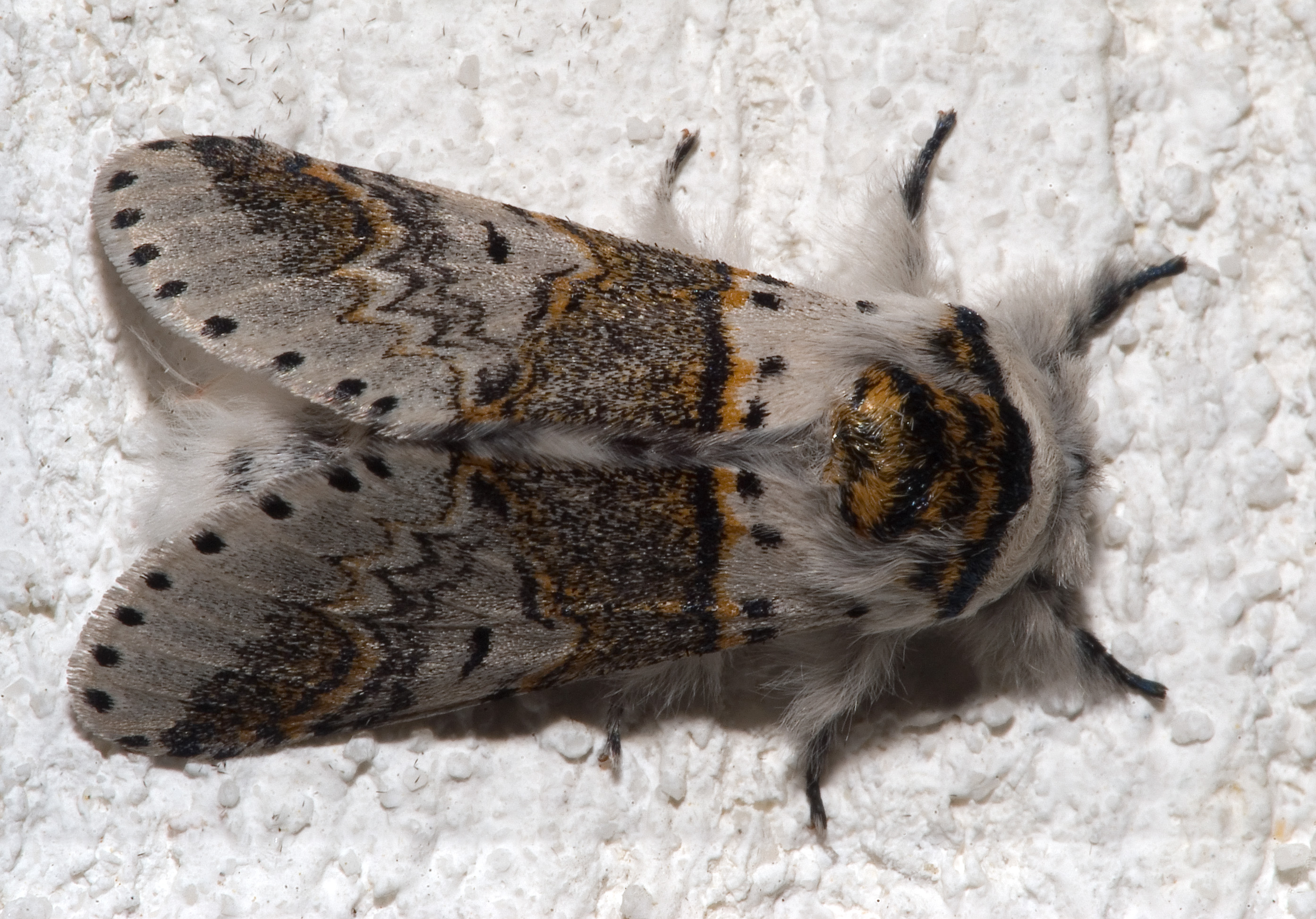
- Furcula furcula

Scientific classification
- Kingdom: Animalia
- Phylum: Arthropoda
- Clade: Pancrustacea
- Class: Insecta
- Order: Lepidoptera
- Superfamily: Noctuoidea
- Family: Notodontidae; Stephens, 1829

Subfamilies
- Acrocteninae Kiriakof, 1970; Anaphinae Sharpe, 1890; Dioptinae Walker, 1862 (incl. Josiidae); Dudusinae Matsumura, 1929 (incl. Tarsolepidinae); Hemiceratinae Guenee, 1852; Heterocampinae Neumogen & Dyar, 1894 (incl. Disphraginae, Fentoniinae, Rifarginae); Notodontinae Stephens, 1829 (incl. Cerurinae, Dicranurinae, Stauropinae); Nystaleinae Forbes, 1948; Periergosinae Kobayashi, 2016; Phalerinae Butler, 1896; Platychasmatinae Nakamura, 1956; Ptilodoninae Packard, 1864 (incl. Ptilophorinae); Pygaerinae Duponchel, 1854; Spataliinae Matsumura, 1929; Roseminae Forbes, 1939; Thaumetopoeinae Aurivillius, 1889

= Notodontidae =

Moth family known as prominents

Notodontidae is a family of moths with approximately 3,800 known species. The family was described by James Francis Stephens in 1829. Moths of this family are found in all parts of the world, but they are most concentrated in tropical areas, especially in the New World (Miller, 1992).

Species of this family tend to be heavy-bodied and long-winged, the wings held folded across the back of the body at rest. They rarely display any bright colours, usually being mainly grey or brown, with the exception of the subfamily Dioptinae (Grimaldi and Engel, 2005). These features mean they rather resemble Noctuidae although the families are not closely related. The adults do not feed. Many species have a tuft of hair on the trailing edge of the forewing which protrudes upwards at rest. This gives them their scientific name "back tooth" and the common name of prominents. The common names of some other species reflect their hairiness, such as puss moth and the group commonly known as kittens (Furcula spp.), so named as they resemble small versions of the puss moth.

== Life cycle ==
=== Egg ===
The egg is hemispherical or almost spherical, and lacks any ribs (Scoble, 1995).

=== Larvae ===
The caterpillars are usually hairless, but may have tubercules, spines, or humps (Scoble 1995), and often rest with both ends raised. The last set of prolegs is frequently vestigial, or may be long, with glands that can be everted. Some larvae undergo shape modification and colour changes with each instar (Weller, 1992). Notodontid larvae are notable for their often bizarre shapes, and some have chemical defences (cyanic acid, formic acid, and other ketones: Blum, 1981) not commonly found in other Lepidoptera (Weller 1992). Schizura unicornis and S. badia have a mixture of formic acid, acetic acid and other compounds which they spray accurately at their attacker (Attygalle et al., 1993).

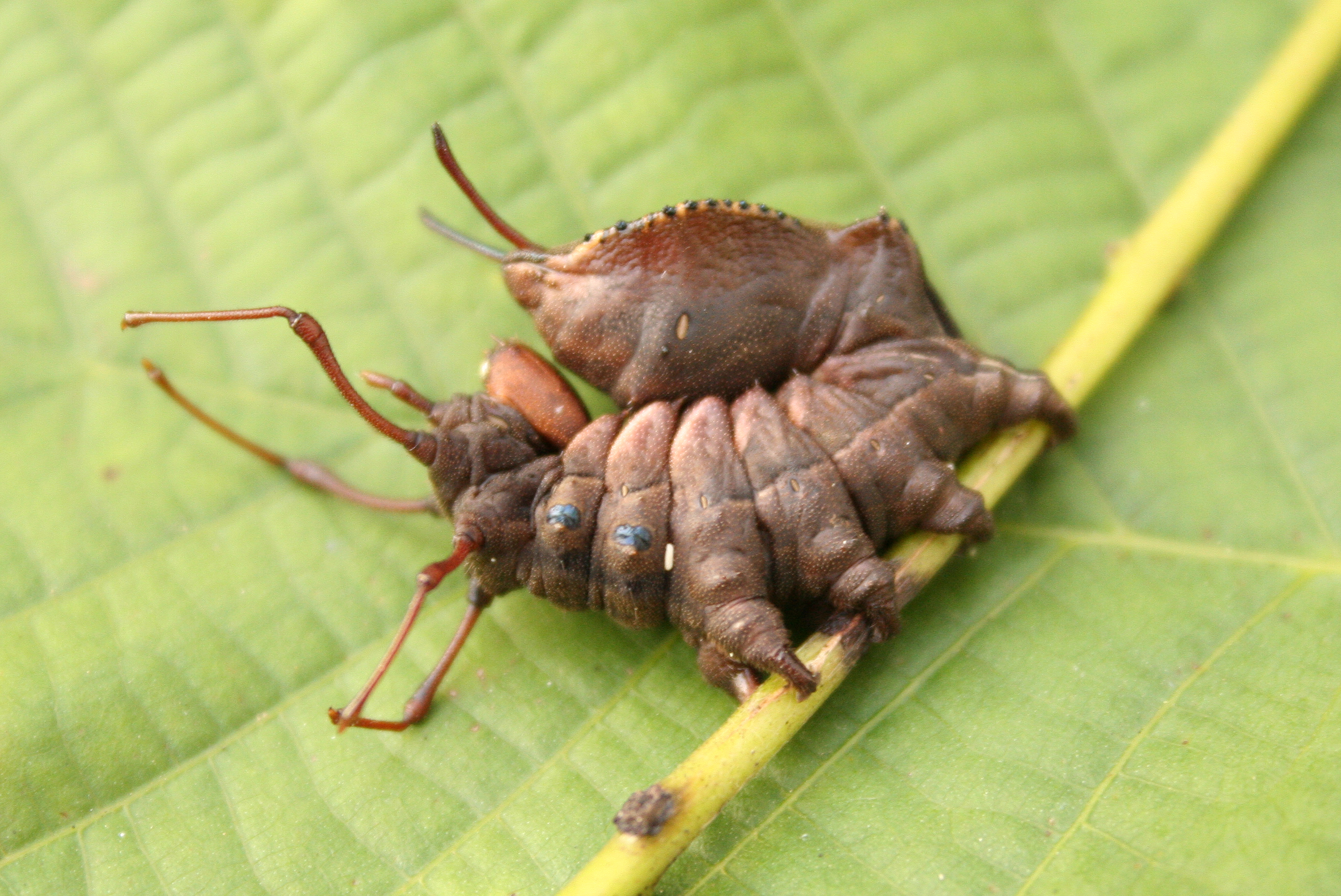
Stauropus fagi larva

The larvae of some species are truly extraordinary: That of the puss moth has a fearsome-looking "face" and two long whip-like "tails" (actually highly modified prolegs) and it rears both ends in a threatening display when disturbed. The larva of the lobster moth is even more remarkable, resembling a crustacean. Others, such as Cerura vinula mimic the edge of a leaf that has been damaged and is turning brown (they rest and feed along the edge of the leaf).

Most are solitary feeders, but some are gregarious, and this is most common in the processionary moths, Thaumetopoeinae.

They feed on trees and shrubs, except in the subfamily Dioptinae, which feed on herbaceous plants (Miller, 1992). The larvae typically feed on only one family of trees, but closely related species will feed on distantly related plants; for example different members of the genus Datana feed on Juglandaceae, Hamamelidaceae, Ericaceae and Anacardiaceae (Miller 1992).

=== Adults ===
Adults have tympanal organs on the metathorax that opens towards the top, and the tibial spurs have serrated edges (Scoble, 1995). Mouthparts vary from well-developed to absent. The Dioptinae, which was formerly considered a separate family, are colourful and fly by day, while the rest of the notodontids are nocturnal. Some of these Dioptinae have non-functional tympanal hearing organs which are normally defensive against bats (Fullard et al., 1997).

== Importance ==
Some notodontids cause noticeable defoliation of their hosts. Well-known defoliators include: the saddled prominent (Heterocampa guttivita), poplar defoliator (Clostera cupreata), California oakworm (Phryganidia californica), the beech caterpillar, (Quadricalcarifera punctatella), variable oakleaf caterpillar (Lochmaeus manteo), Epicerura pergisea, yellownecked caterpillars (Datana ministra), and walnut caterpillar (Datana integerrima), among others.

== Systematics ==
Formerly, the genus Oenosandra was placed in this family and the subfamily Thaumetopoeinae was treated at independent family rank, however they have now been reclassified. Recent molecular research has stabilized and consolidated most of the constituent subfamily and tribal rank taxa.

== Notable species ==
- Buff-tip (Phalera bucephala)
- Puss moth (Cerura vinula)
- Lobster moth (Stauropus fagi)
- Poplar kitten (Furcula bifida)
- Coxcomb prominent (Ptilodon capucina)
- Rough prominent (Nadata gibbosa)

== See also ==
- Comparison of butterflies and moths
- Ochrogaster, a genus of Australian processionary caterpillar
