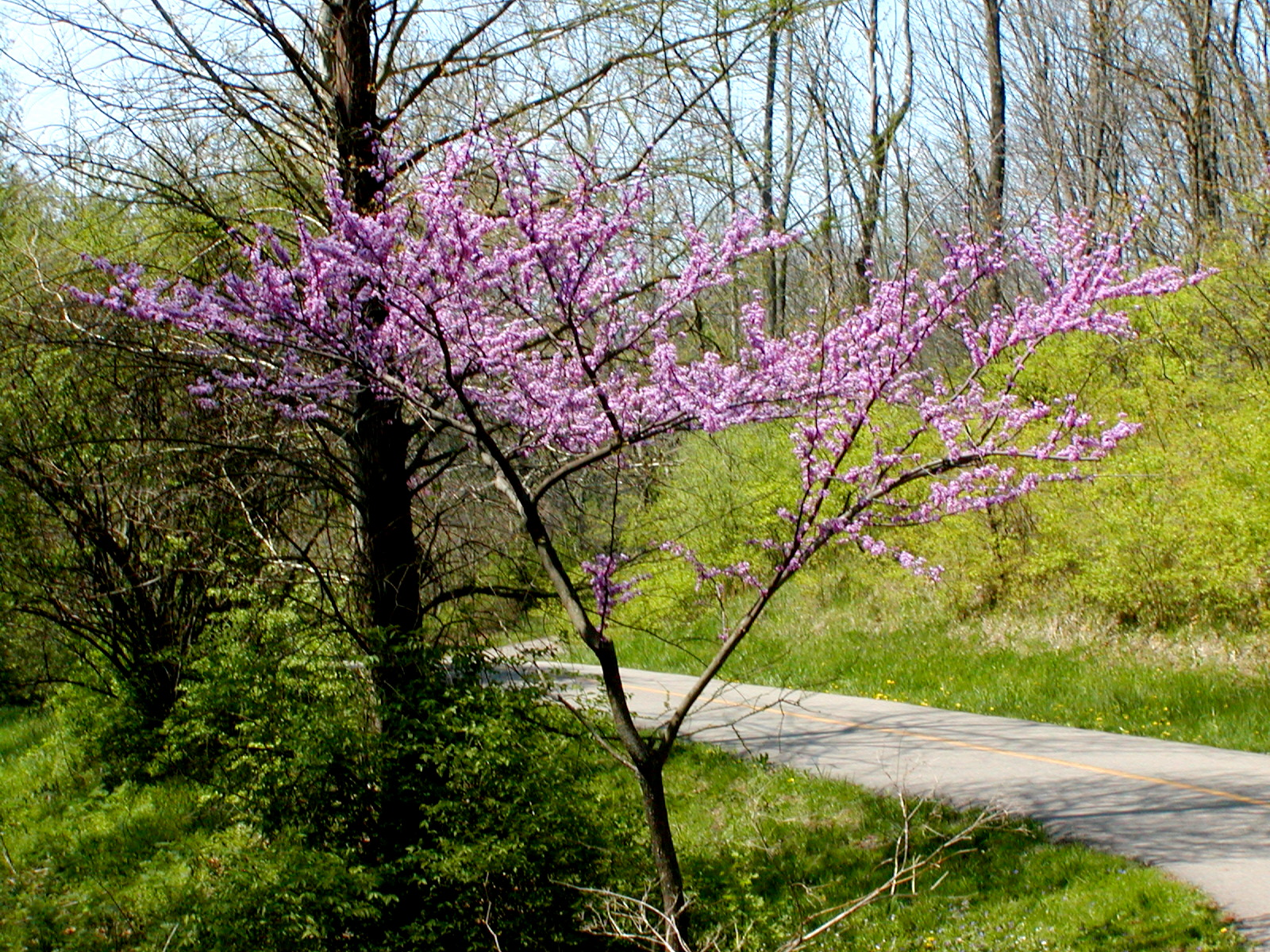
- Eastern redbud near Cincinnati, Ohio

Conservation status
- Least Concern (IUCN 3.1)

Scientific classification
- Kingdom: Plantae
- Clade: Tracheophytes
- Clade: Angiosperms
- Clade: Eudicots
- Clade: Rosids
- Order: Fabales
- Family: Fabaceae
- Genus: Cercis
- Species: C. canadensis

Binomial name
- Cercis canadensis L. (1753)

Subspecies
- Cercis canadensis subsp. canadensis; Cercis canadensis subsp. mexicana (Rose) A.E.Murray; Cercis canadensis subsp. texensis (S.Watson) A.E.Murray
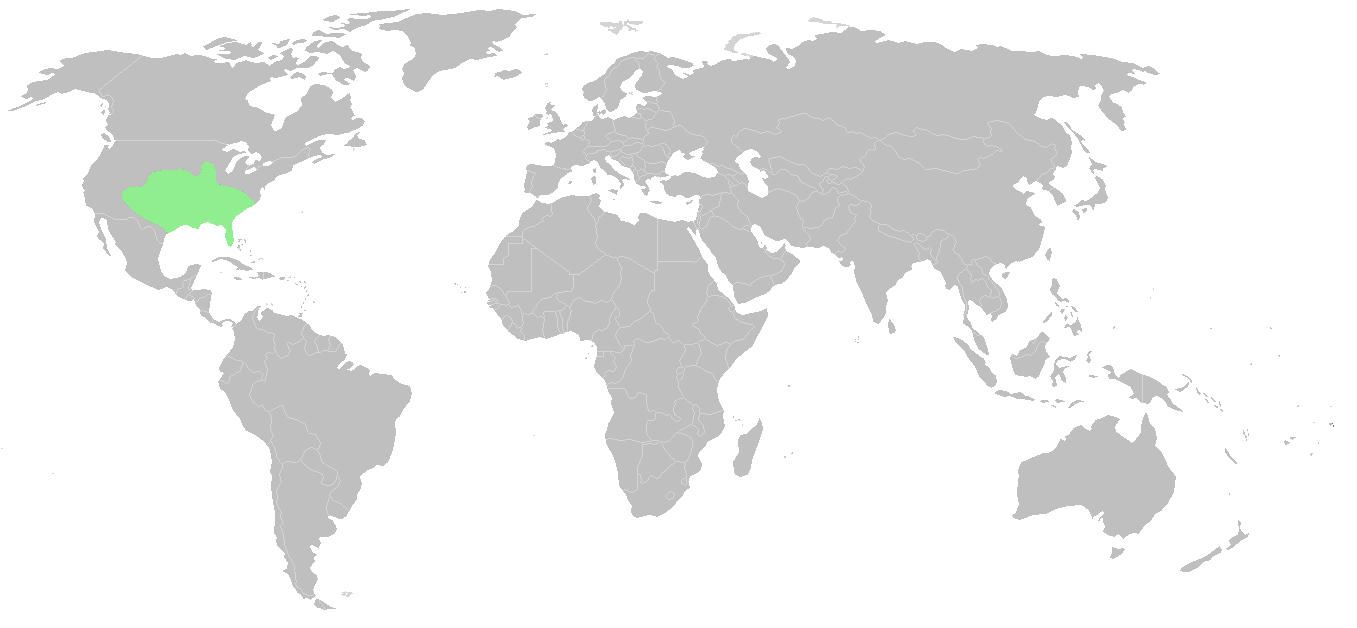

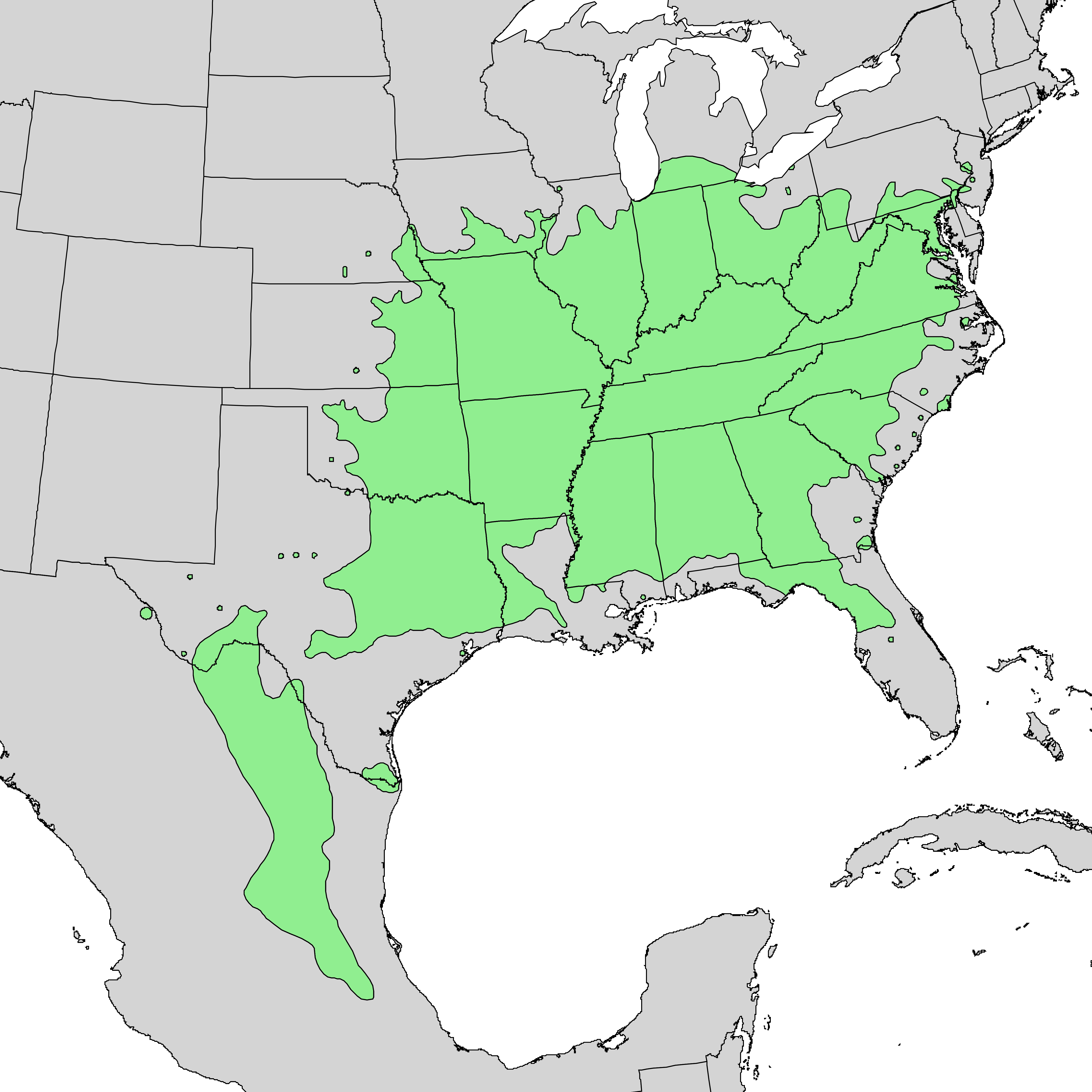
- Natural range of the eastern redbud

Synonyms
- Cercis canadensis var. typica M.Hopkins (1942), not validly publ.; Siliquastrum canadense (L.) Medik. (1787)

= Cercis canadensis =

Species of tree

Cercis canadensis, the eastern redbud, is a large deciduous shrub or small tree, native to eastern North America from southern Michigan south to central Mexico, west to New Mexico, but able to thrive as far west as California and as far north as southern Ontario. It is the state tree of Oklahoma and the official city tree of Huntington Beach. The prevalence of the so-called "Columbus strain" has seen the residents of Columbus, Wisconsin, embrace the plant in their city's identity. Known as the "Redbud City," the town hosts "Redbud Day" annually the Saturday before Mother's Day, organizing a variety of themed events to recognize the tree.

== Description ==
The eastern redbud typically grows to 6–9 m (20–30 ft) tall with an 8–10 m (26–33 ft) spread. It generally has a short, often twisted trunk and spreading branches. A 10-year-old tree will generally be around 5 m (16 ft) tall. The bark is dark in color, smooth, later scaly with ridges somewhat apparent, sometimes with maroon patches. The twigs are slender and zigzag, nearly black in color, spotted with lighter lenticels. The winter buds are tiny, rounded and dark red to chestnut in color. The leaves are alternate, simple, and heart shaped with an entire margin, 7–12 cm (3–4.5 in) long and wide, thin and papery, and may be slightly hairy below.

The flowers are showy, light to dark magenta pink in color, 1.5 cm (1/2 in) long, appearing in clusters from spring to early summer, on bare stems before the leaves, sometimes on the trunk itself. There are cultivars with white flowers. The flowers are pollinated by long-tongued bees such as blueberry bees and carpenter bees. Short-tongued bees cannot reach the nectaries. The fruit are flattened, dry, brown, pea-like pods, 5–10 cm (2–4 in) long that contain flat, elliptical, brown seeds 6 mm (1/4 in) long, maturing in August to October.

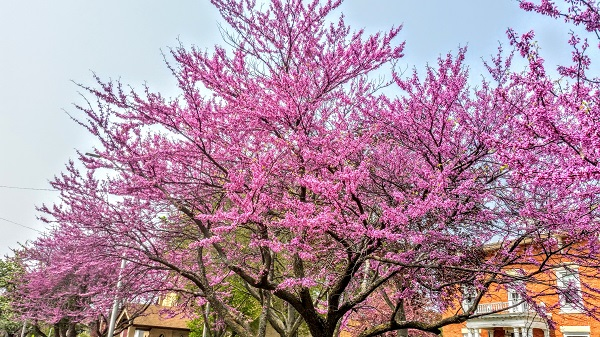
Redbud in Columbus, Wisconsin

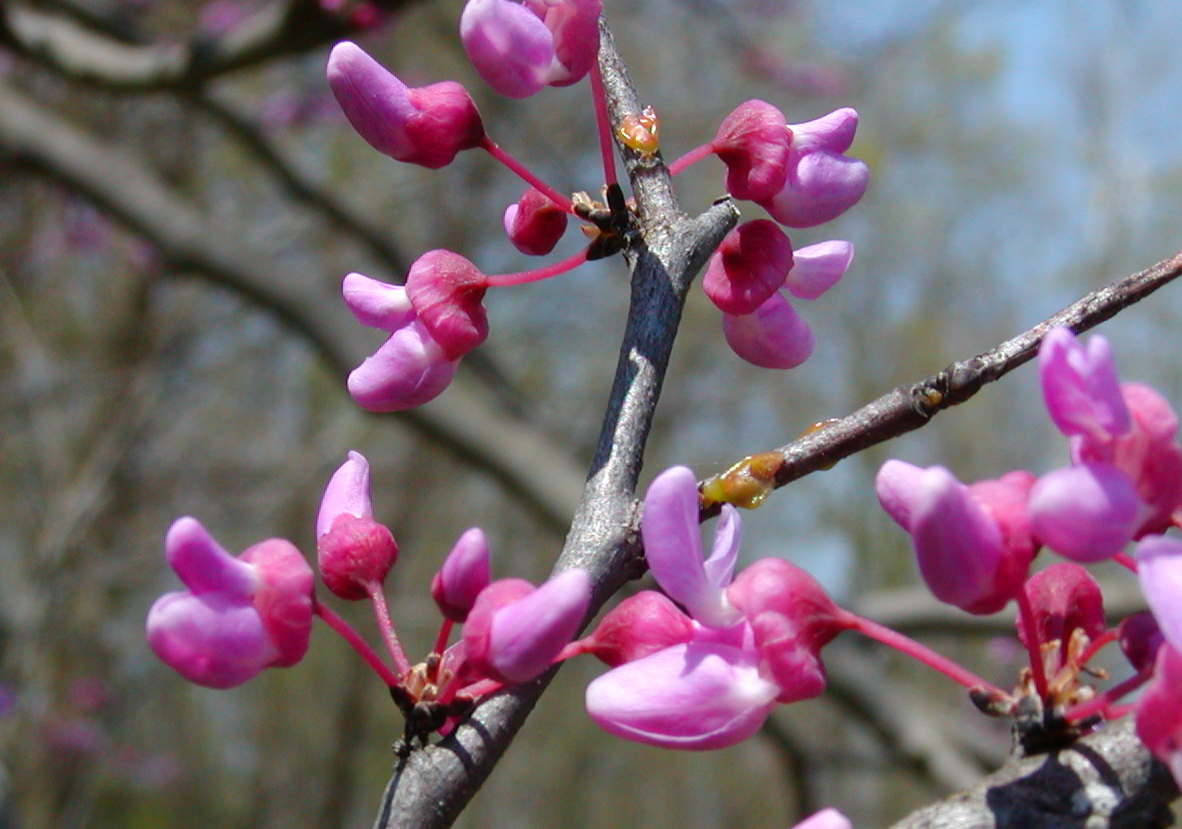
Detail of buds

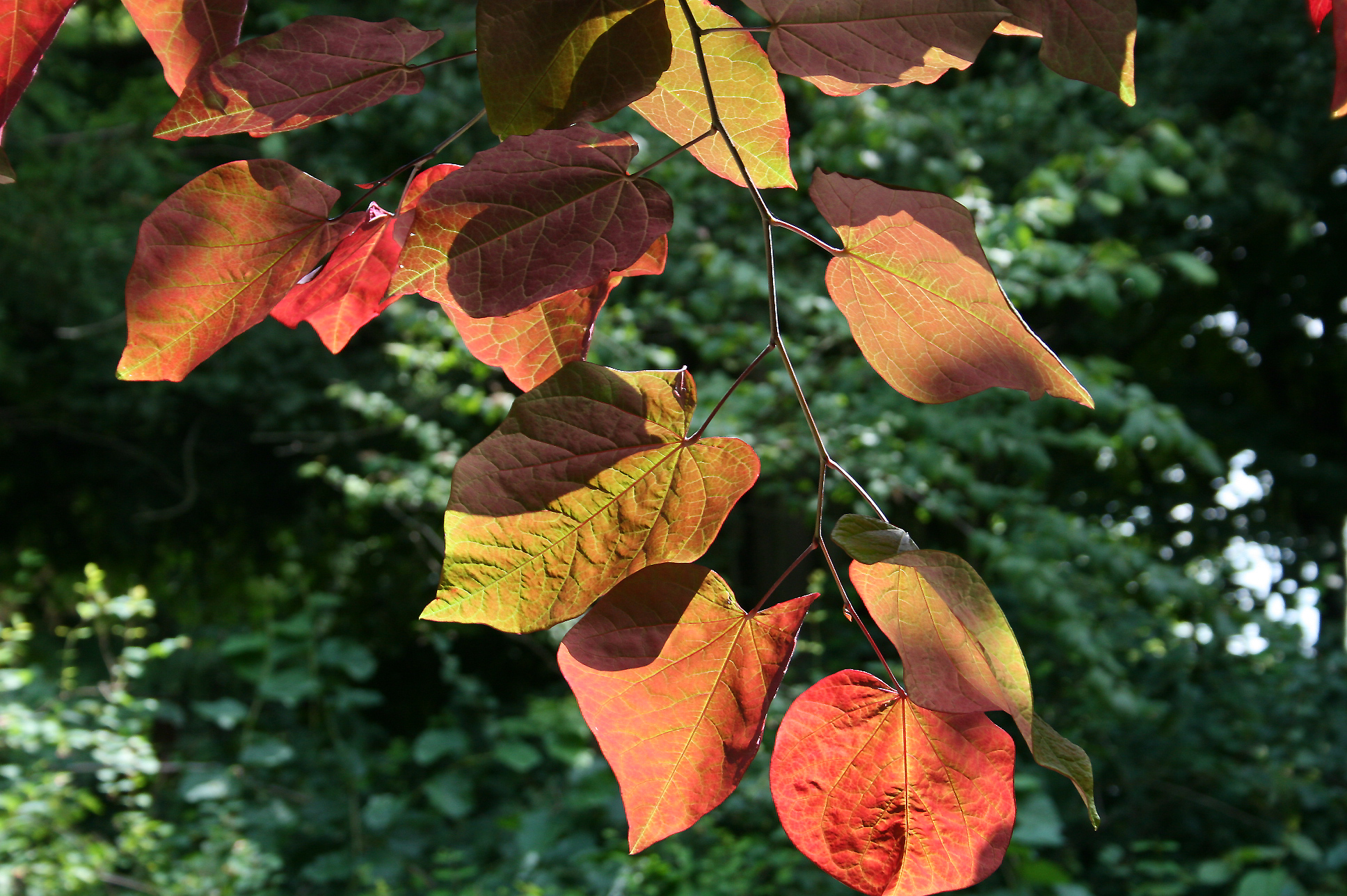
Cercis canadensis 'Forest Pansy' leaves in July.

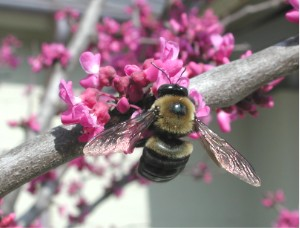
Carpenter bee (Xylocopa virginica) on redbud flowers.

- Bark: Red brown, with deep fissures and scaly surface. Branchlets at first lustrous brown, later become darker.
- Wood: Dark reddish brown; heavy, hard, coarse-grained, not strong. Sp. gr., 0.6363; weight of cu. ft. 39.65 lbs.
- Winter buds: Chestnut brown, obtuse, one-eighth inch long.
- Cotyledons oval, flat
- Leaves: Alternate, simple, heart-shaped or broadly ovate, two to five inches long, five to seven-nerved, cordate or truncate at the base, entire, acute. They come out of the bud folded along the line of the midrib, tawny green; when they are full grown they become smooth, dark green above, paler beneath. In autumn they turn bright clear yellow. Petioles slender, terete, enlarged at the base. Stipules caducous.
- Flowers: April, May, before and with the leaves, papilionaceous. Perfect, rose color, borne four to eight together, in fascicles which appear at the axils of the leaves or along the branch and sometimes on the trunk itself.
- Calyx: Dark red, campanulate, oblique, five-toothed, imbricate in bud.
- Corolla: Papilionaceous, petals five, nearly equal, pink or rose color, upper petal the smallest, enclosed in the bud by the wings, and encircled by the broader keel petals.
- Stamens: Ten, inserted in two rows on a thin disk, free, the inner row rather shorter than the others.
- Pistil: Ovary superior, inserted obliquely in the bottom of the calyx tube, stipitate; style fleshy, incurved, tipped with an obtuse stigma.
- Fruit: Legume, slightly stipitate, unequally oblong, acute at each end. Compressed, tipped with the remnants of the style, straight on upper and curved on the lower edge. Two and a half to three inches long, rose color, full grown by midsummer, falls in early winter. Seeds ten to twelve, chestnut brown, one-fourth of an inch long.

== Subspecies ==
Three subspecies are accepted:

- Cercis canadensis subsp. canadensis (synonyms C. dilatata, C. ellipsoidea, and C. georgiana) – eastern and Central United States to northeastern and central Mexico
- Cercis canadensis subsp. mexicana (Rose) A.E.Murray (synonym C. mexicana) – northeastern Mexico, southwestern Texas (Trans-Pecos), southeastern New Mexico
- Cercis canadensis subsp. texensis (S.Watson) A.E.Murray (synonyms C nitida, C. reniformis, and C. texensis) Oklahoma redbud – Oklahoma and Texas east of the Pecos River

== Ecological benefits ==
The leaves are eaten by the caterpillars of some Lepidoptera—for example, Henry's elfin, the redbud leaffolder, the red-humped caterpillar (which can cause extensive defoliation in late summer but generally does no lasting harm to a healthy tree), the fall webworm (also a late-season defoliator), the white flannel moth, the American dagger moth, the grape leaffolder, and the Io moth.

Species of Cercis are members of the family Fabaceae, characterized by their ability to form a symbiosis with the nitrogen fixing actinomycetota Frankia, in the subfamily Cercidoideae. While in many members of Fabaceae, this association leads to the formation of nitrogen-fixing root nodules, C.canadensis lacks the gene necessary to form nodules and thus does not host nitrogen-fixing microbes.

== Cultivation ==
Cercis canadensis is grown in parks and gardens, with several cultivars being available. The cultivars 'Forest Pansy' and 'Ruby Falls' have gained the Royal Horticultural Society's Award of Garden Merit (confirmed 2017). Both are cultivated for their showy purple leaves, which turn brilliant shades of red and orange in the fall (autumn). 'Ruby Falls' is a weeping form.

In the wild, eastern redbud is a frequent native understory tree in mixed forests and hedgerows. It is also much planted as a landscape ornamental plant.

In the United States, this tree is difficult to grow farther west into arid areas west of western Kansas and Colorado, as there is not enough rain. There has been success growing the tree in Columbus, Wisconsin, whose cultivar has become known as the "Columbus strain" and is a seed source for nurseries. Seeds can be made to germinate by first dipping in boiled (99 °C) water for one minute and then sowing in a pot (do not boil the seeds).

Cercis canadensis var. mexicana are tolerant of high salinity levels allowing them to grow more effectively in areas similar to the southwestern United States.

== Uses ==
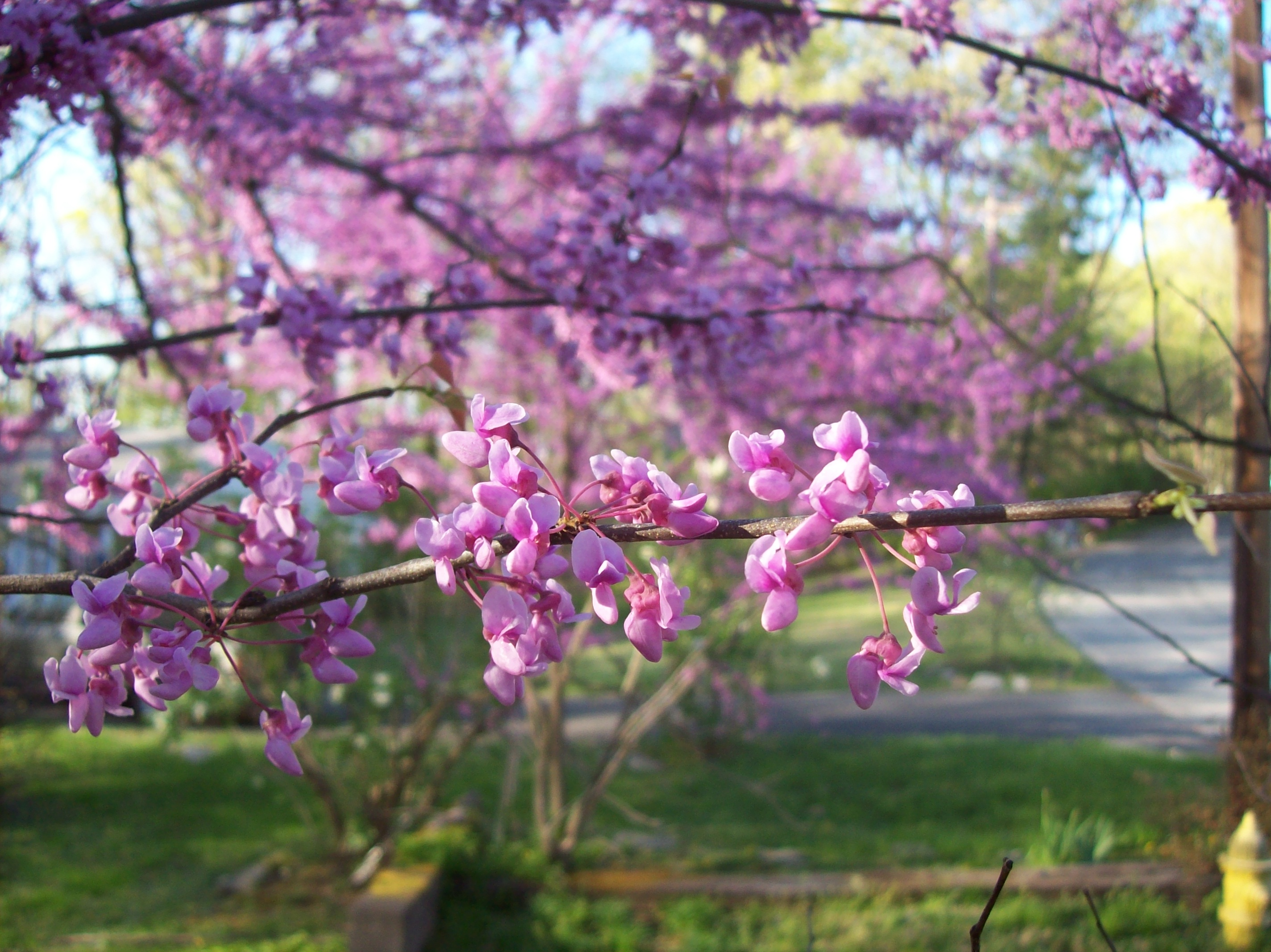
Eastern redbud blossoms

The flowers can be eaten fresh or fried.

In some parts of southern Appalachia, green twigs from the eastern redbud are used as seasoning for wild game, such as venison and opossum. Because of this, in these mountain areas the eastern redbud is sometimes known as the spicewood tree.

Native Americans consume redbud flowers raw or boiled, and eat roasted seeds. Analysis of nutritional components in edible parts of eastern redbud reported that the flower extract contains anthocyanins, green developing seeds contained proanthocyanidin, and linolenic, α-linolenic, oleic and palmitic acids are present in seeds.
