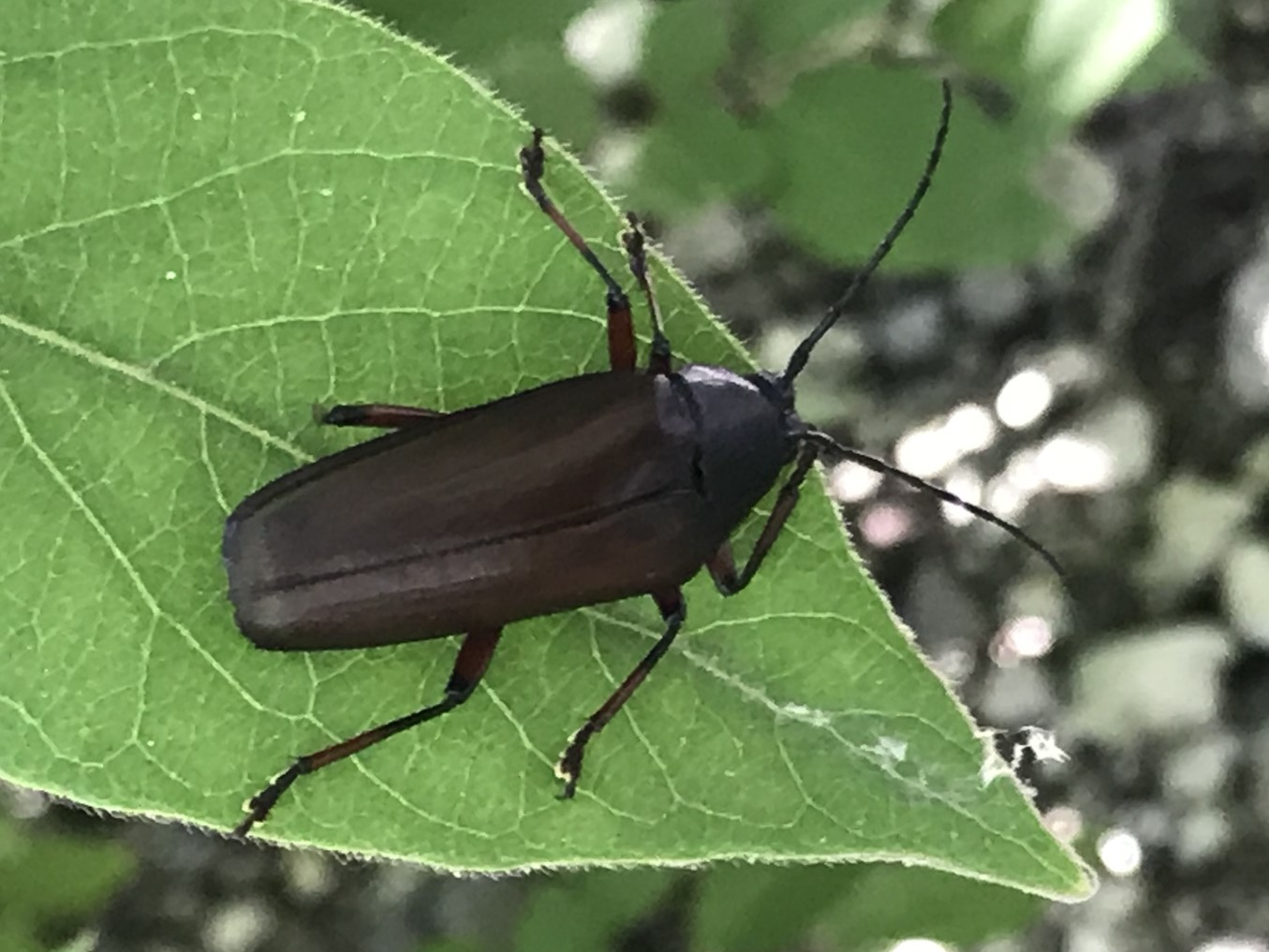

Scientific classification
- Kingdom: Animalia
- Phylum: Arthropoda
- Clade: Pancrustacea
- Class: Insecta
- Order: Coleoptera
- Suborder: Polyphaga
- Infraorder: Cucujiformia
- Family: Cerambycidae
- Subfamily: Prioninae
- Tribe: Solenopterini
- Genus: Sphenostethus; Westwood, 1845
- Species: S. taslei

Binomial name
- Sphenostethus taslei (Buquet, 1841)

Synonyms
- Hoplopteryx Westwood, 1841 (Preocc.)

= Sphenostethus =

Genus of beetles

Sphenostethus is a genus of beetles in the family Cerambycidae (longhorn beetles). It is monotypic, being represented by the single species Sphenostethus taslei.

It is found throughout the eastern United States, from Pennsylvania to Texas. Craighead noted that its larvae are unusual in their habit of boring into dry dead treetop limbs, rather than damp wood near the ground This point was contested by Vlasak & Vlasakova, who recorded that S. taslei larvae were more frequently found in fallen limbs, not necessarily preferring treetop branches. They also argued against the association with dry branches, finding instead a larval preference for limbs of smaller diameter compared to other prionids. Various hardwoods are used as larval hosts, including oak, chestnut, and redbud. They are also frequently found in American beech. Craighead remarked that the adults of this species are rarely seen, but the larvae are quite common.
