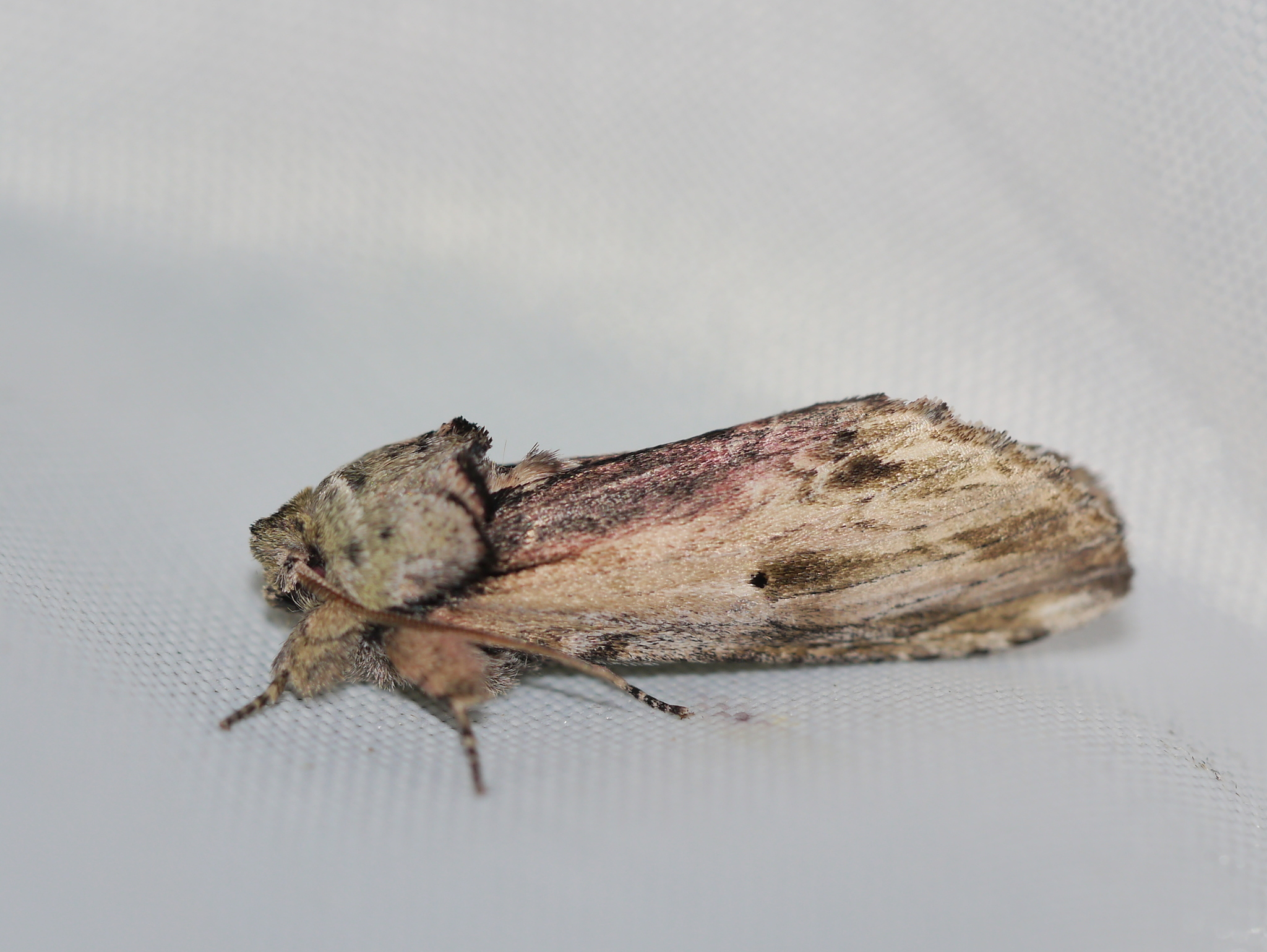
- Oedemasia semirufescens, red-washed prominent, Virginia

Scientific classification
- Kingdom: Animalia
- Phylum: Arthropoda
- Clade: Pancrustacea
- Class: Insecta
- Order: Lepidoptera
- Superfamily: Noctuoidea
- Family: Notodontidae
- Subfamily: Heterocampinae
- Genus: Oedemasia; Packard, 1864

= Oedemasia =

Genus of prominent moths

Oedemasia is a genus of prominent moths in the family Notodontidae. There are at least four described species in Oedemasia, found mainly in North America.

== Species ==
These four species belong to the genus Oedemasia:

- Oedemasia concinna (J. E. Smith, 1797) (red-humped caterpillar)
- Oedemasia leptinoides (Grote, 1864) (black-blotched schizura)
- Oedemasia salicis (Edwards, 1877)
- Oedemasia semirufescens (Walker, 1865) (red-washed prominent)

== Gallery ==
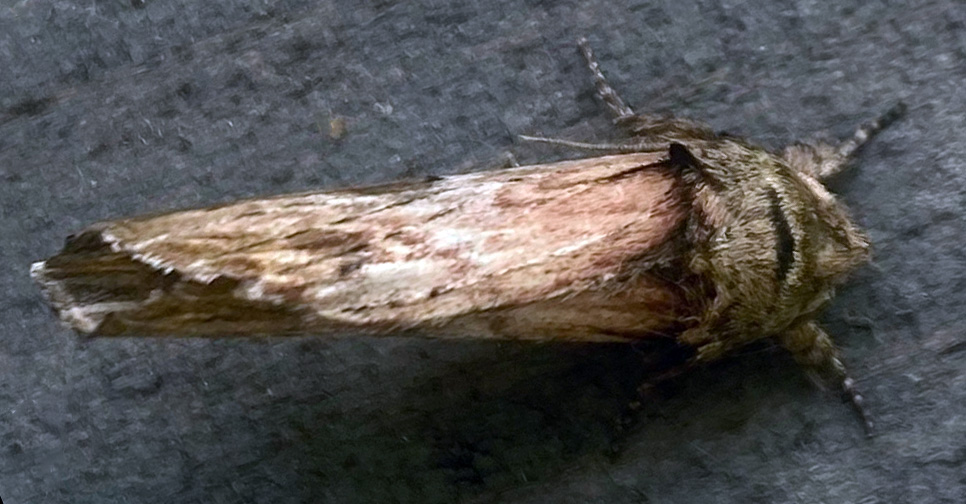
Oedemasia semirufescens found in Oregon

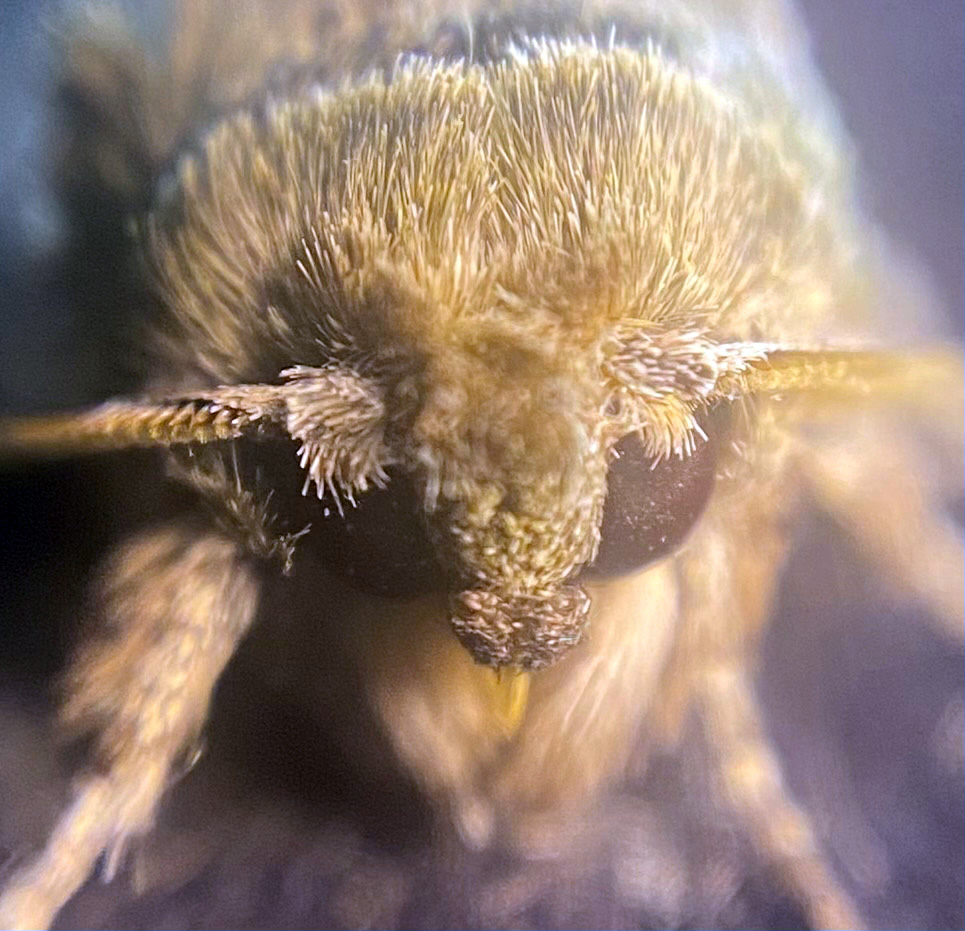
Oedemasia semirufescens, close up of face

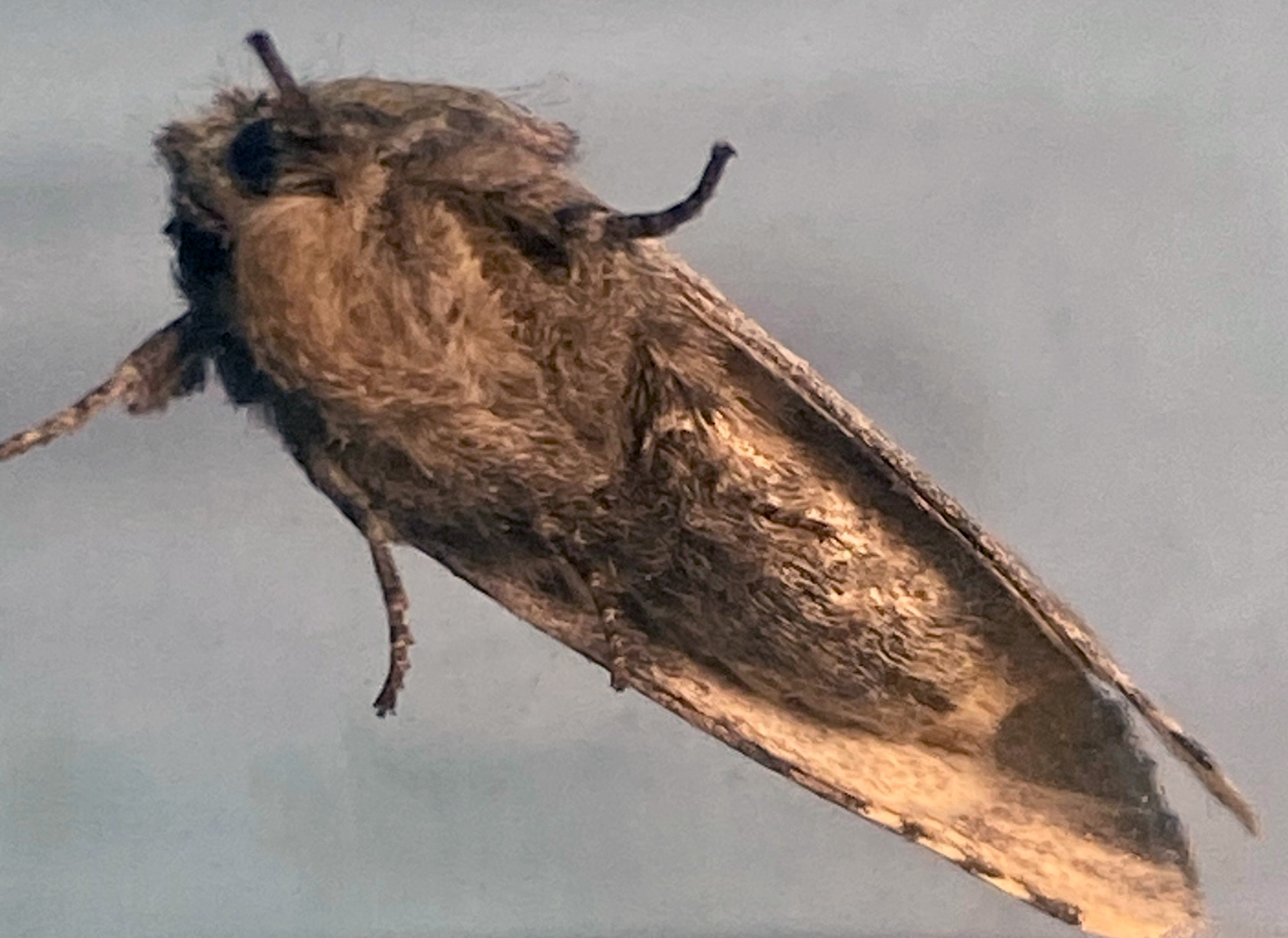
Oedemasia semirufescens, ventral view

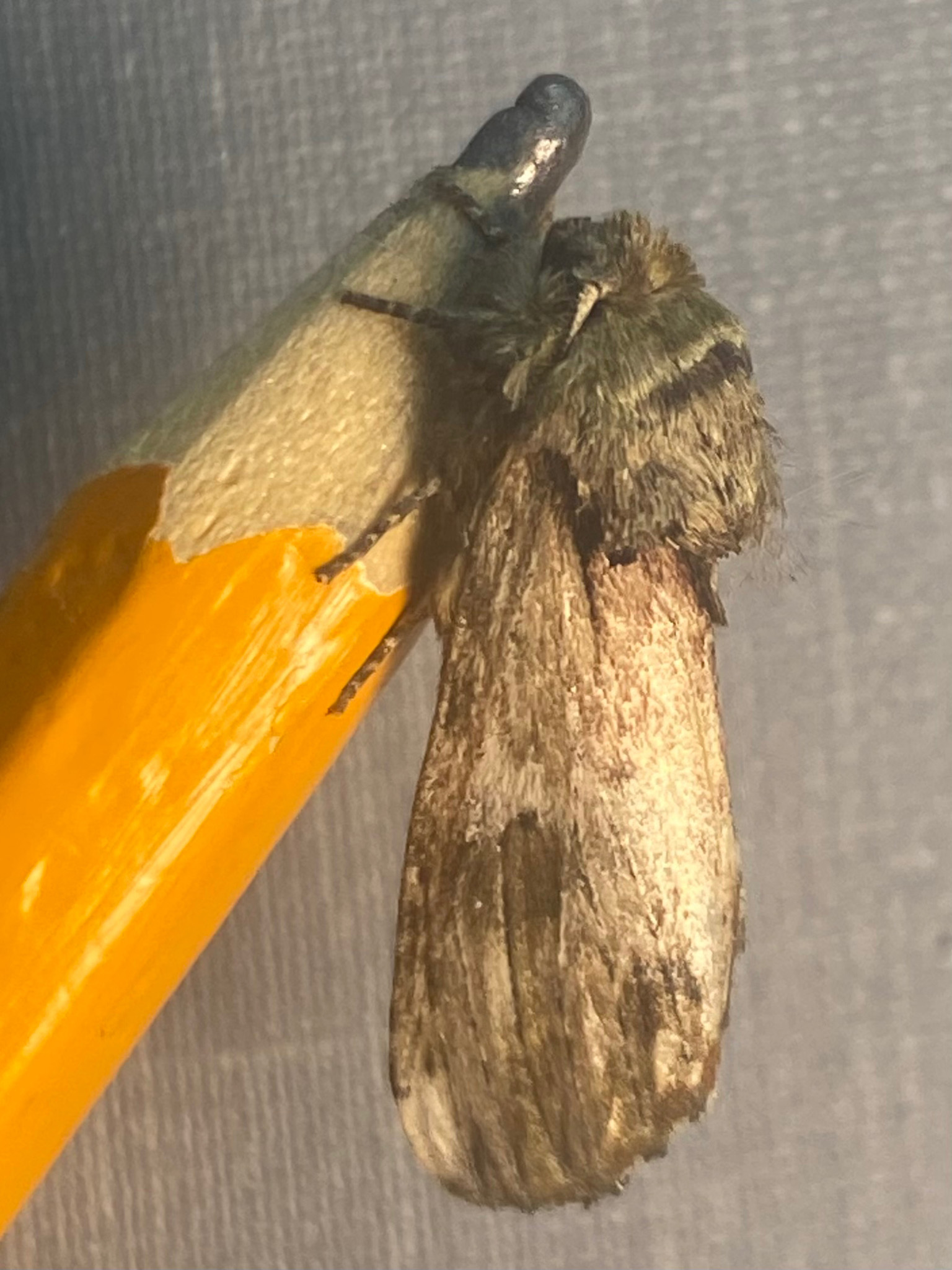
Oedemasia semirufescens
