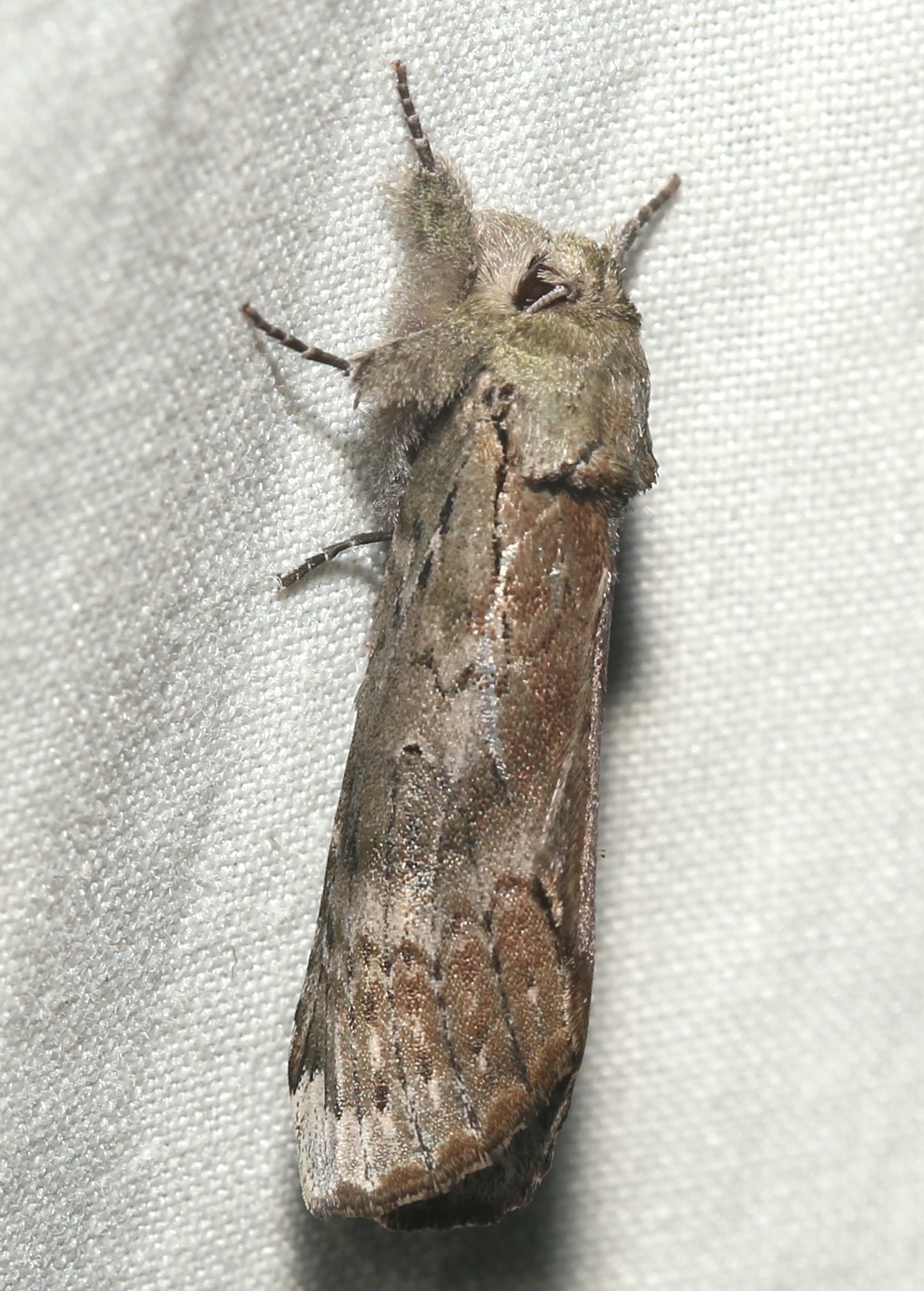

Scientific classification
- Kingdom: Animalia
- Phylum: Arthropoda
- Clade: Pancrustacea
- Class: Insecta
- Order: Lepidoptera
- Superfamily: Noctuoidea
- Family: Notodontidae
- Genus: Oedemasia
- Species: O. leptinoides

Binomial name
- Oedemasia leptinoides (Grote, 1864)

Synonyms
- Schizura leptinoides Grote, 1864

= Oedemasia leptinoides =

Species of moth

Oedemasia leptinoides, the black-blotched schizura or black-blotched prominent, is a species of moth in the family Notodontidae (the prominents). It was first described by Augustus Radcliffe Grote in 1864 and is found in North America.

== Taxonomy ==
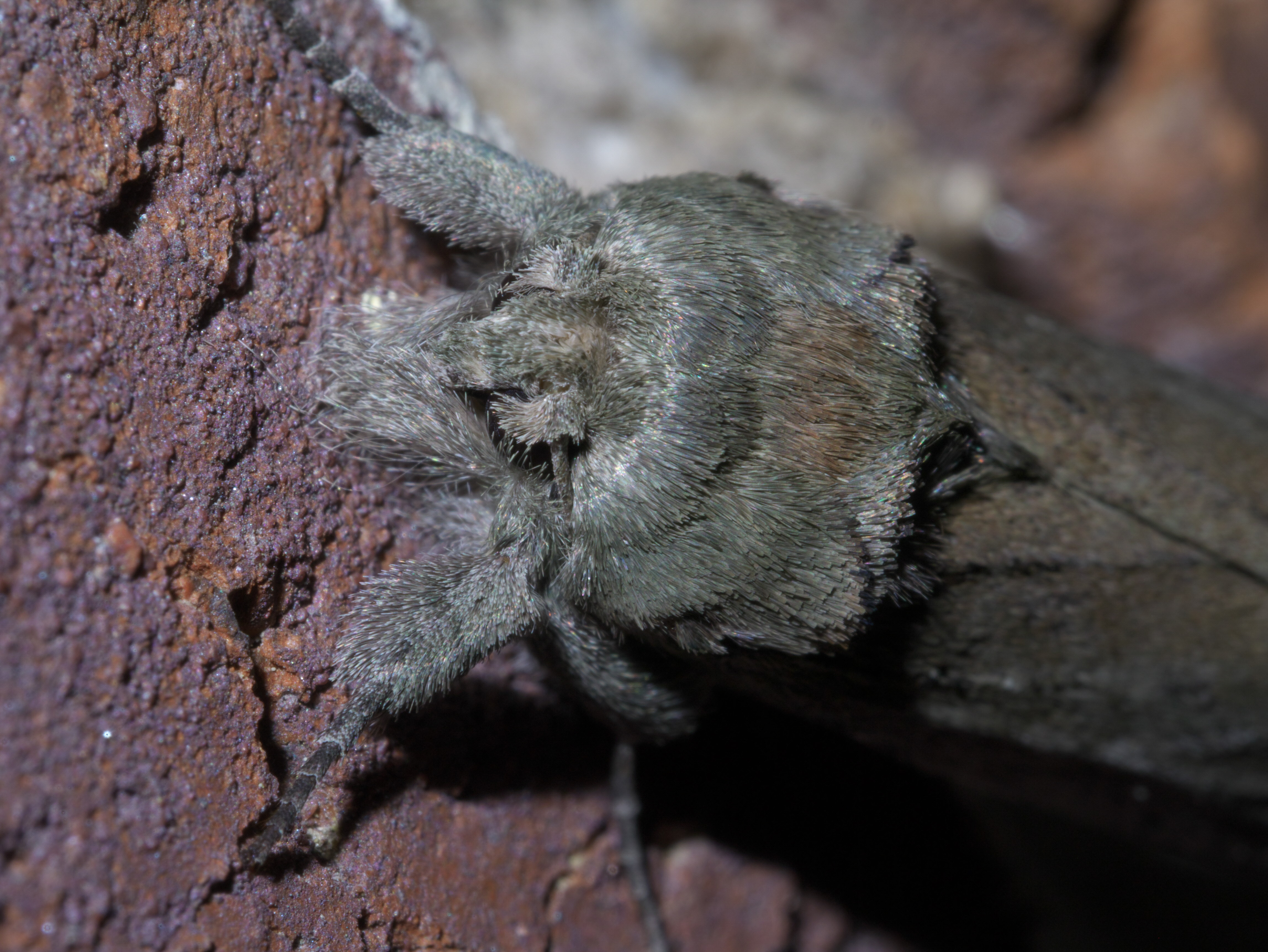

This species was formerly a member of the genus Schizura, but was transferred to Oedemasia as a result of research published in 2021. Caterpillars engage in girdling, selectively damaging the area near the stem of the host plant. Host plants for O. leptinoides include Carya texana and Carya illinoinensis.
