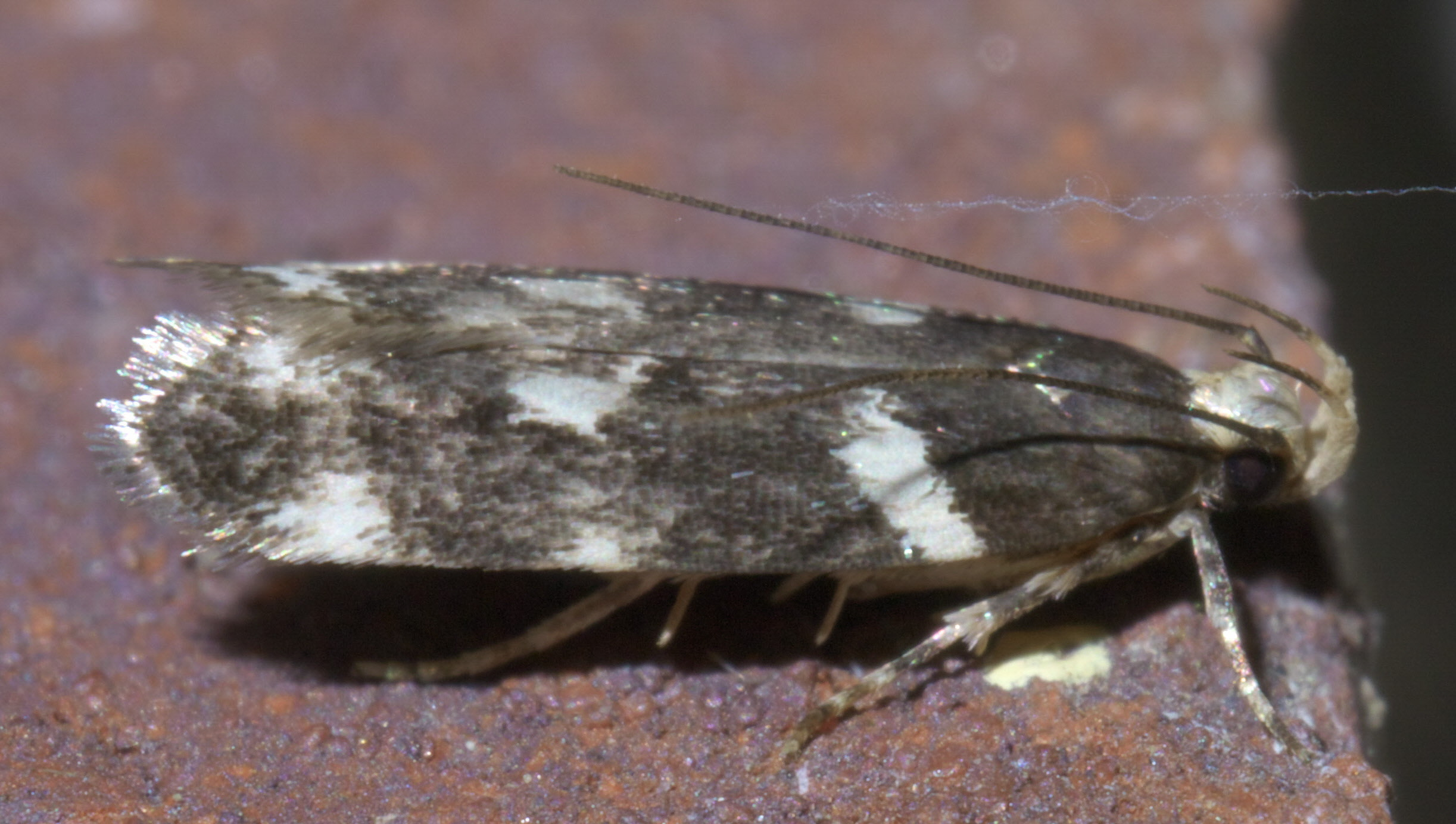

Scientific classification
- Domain: Eukaryota
- Kingdom: Animalia
- Phylum: Arthropoda
- Class: Insecta
- Order: Lepidoptera
- Family: Gelechiidae
- Tribe: Gelechiini
- Genus: Fascista; Busck, 1939

= Fascista =

Genus of moths

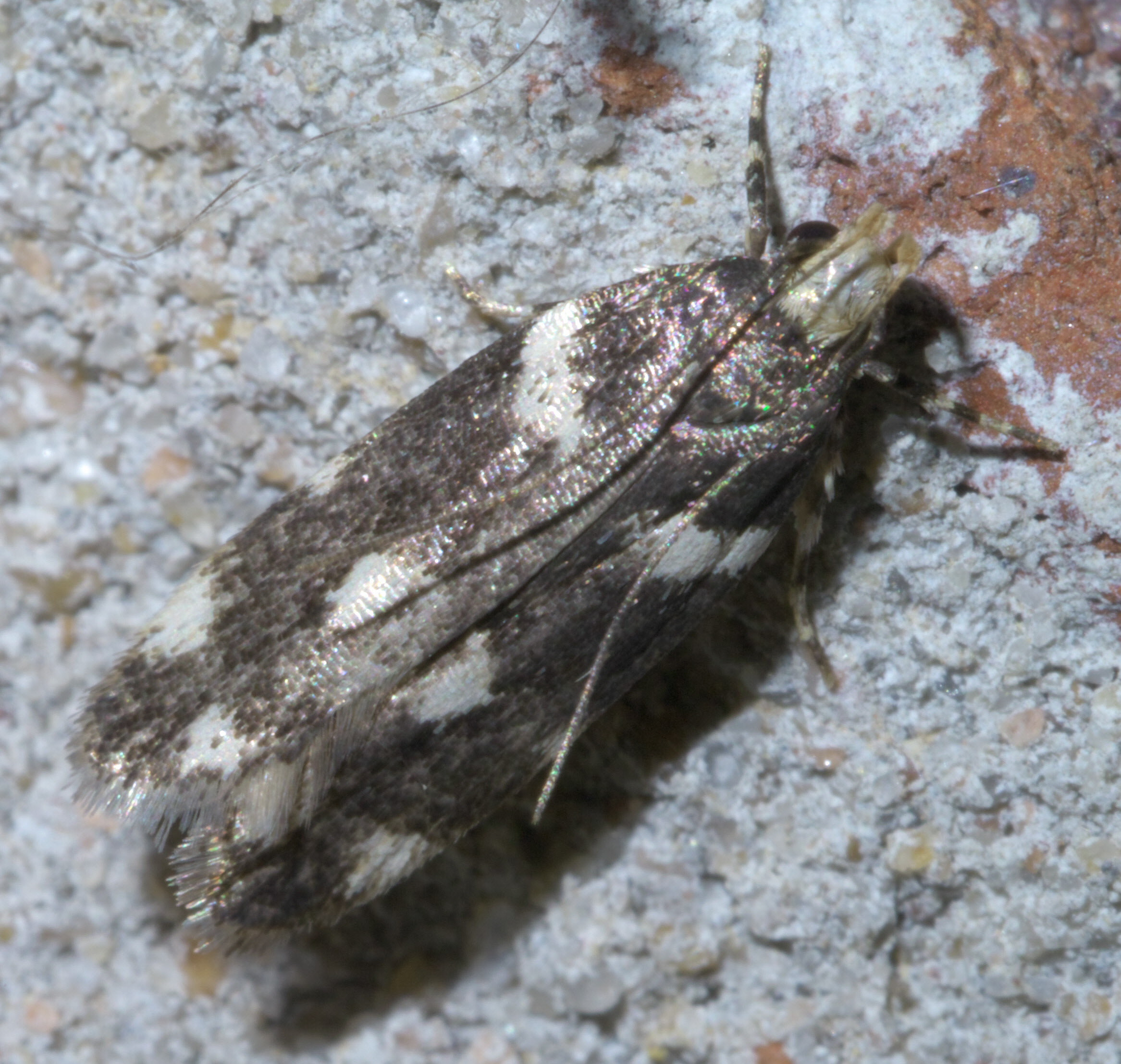
Fascista

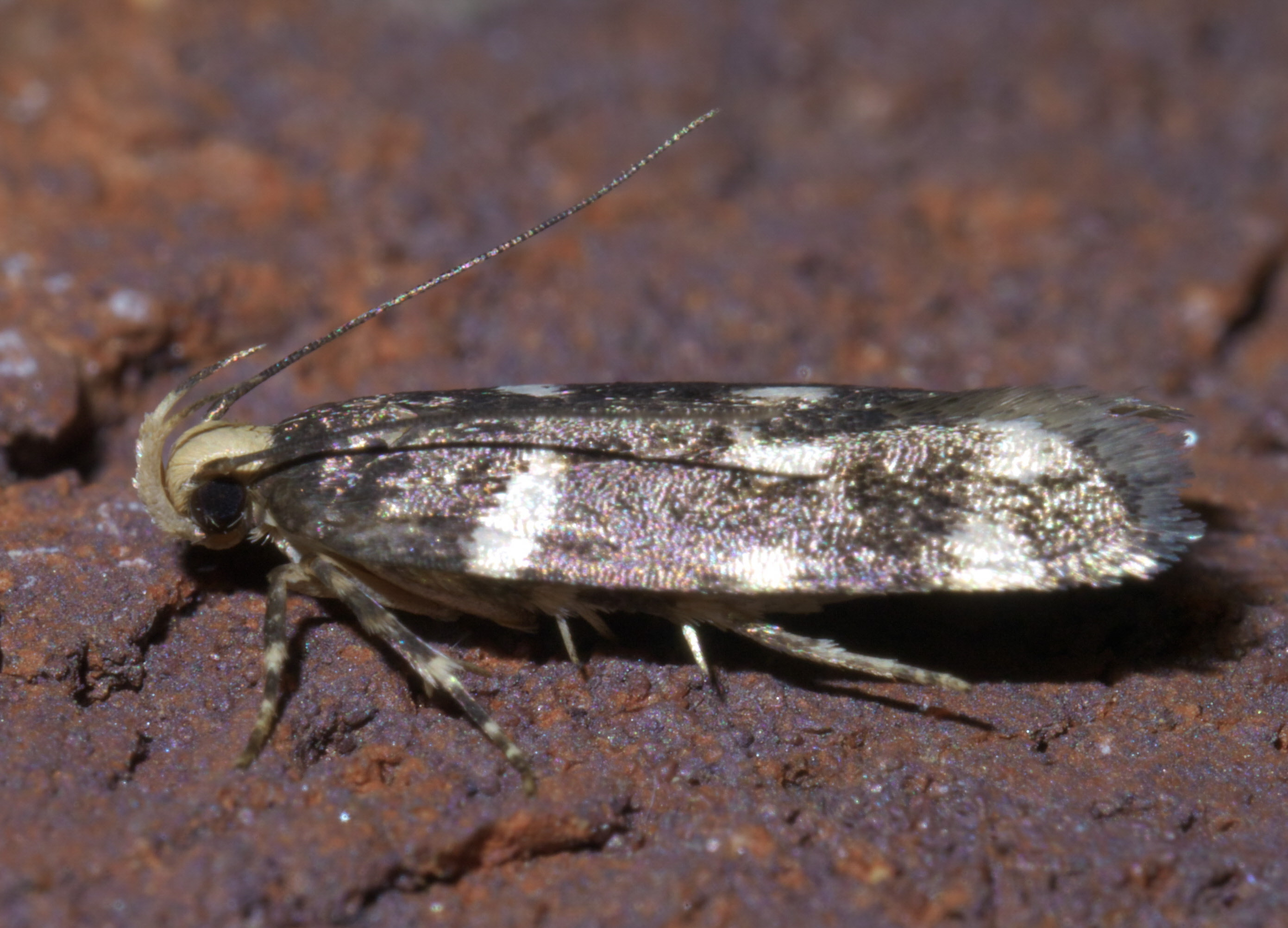
Fascista

Fascista is a genus of moths in the family Gelechiidae.

== Species ==
- Fascista bimaculella (Chambers, 1872)
- Fascista cercerisella (Chambers, 1872)
- Fascista quinella (Zeller, 1873)
