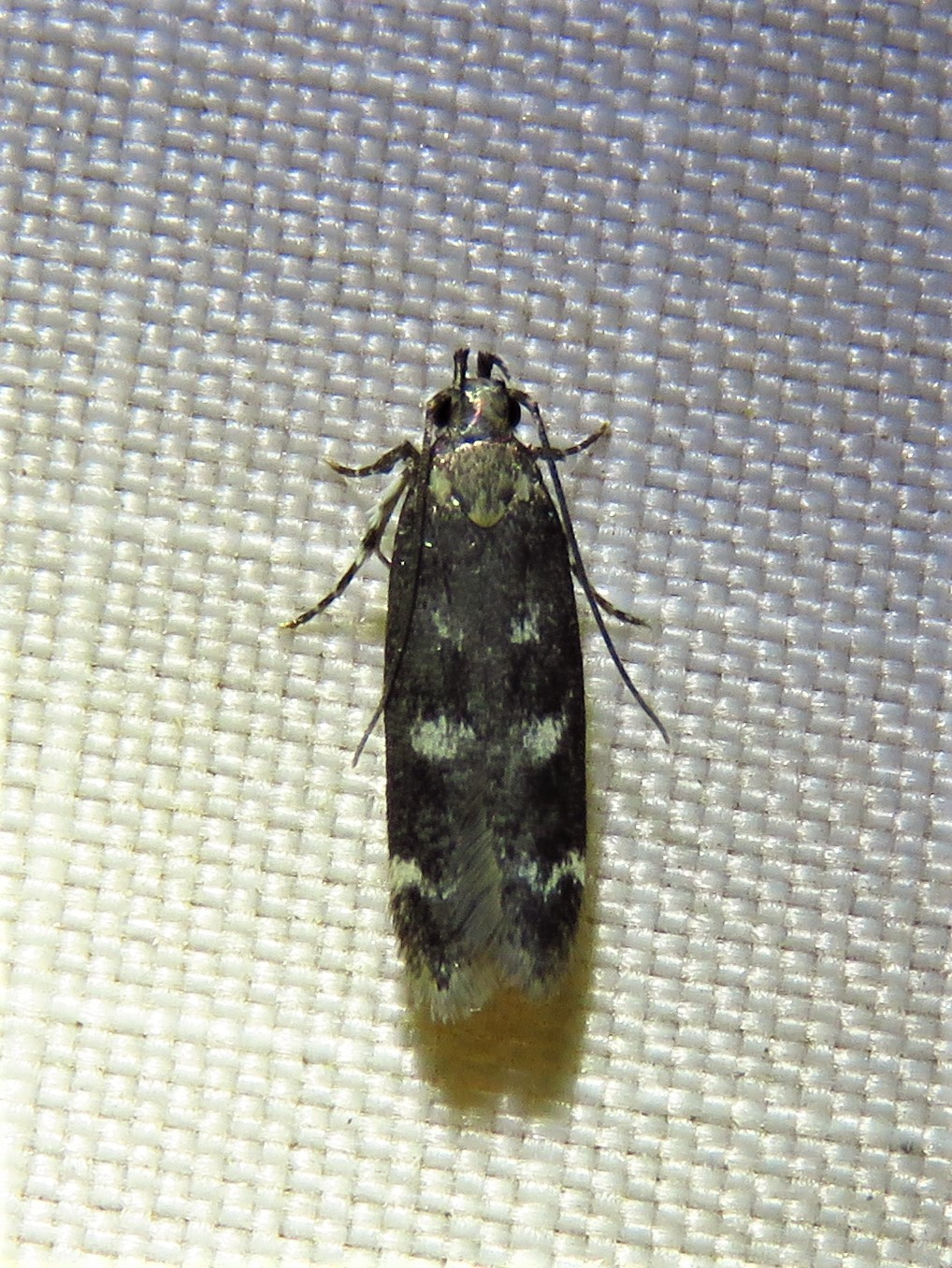
- Fascista bimaculella, Texas

Scientific classification
- Kingdom: Animalia
- Phylum: Arthropoda
- Clade: Pancrustacea
- Class: Insecta
- Order: Lepidoptera
- Family: Gelechiidae
- Genus: Fascista
- Species: F. bimaculella

Binomial name
- Fascista bimaculella (Chambers, 1872)

Synonyms
- Depressaria bimaculella Chambers, 1872; Gelechia (Lita) ternariella Zeller, 1873; Gelechia sylvaecolella Chambers, 1878

= Fascista bimaculella =

Species of moth

Fascista bimaculella is a moth of the family Gelechiidae. It is found in North America, where it has been recorded in the United States east of the Rocky Mountains.

The forewings are shining dark purplish-brown or black with a large white spot on the disc just beyond the middle, and a white spot or streak which starts from the beginning of the costal cilia, but does not reach the dorsal margin.
