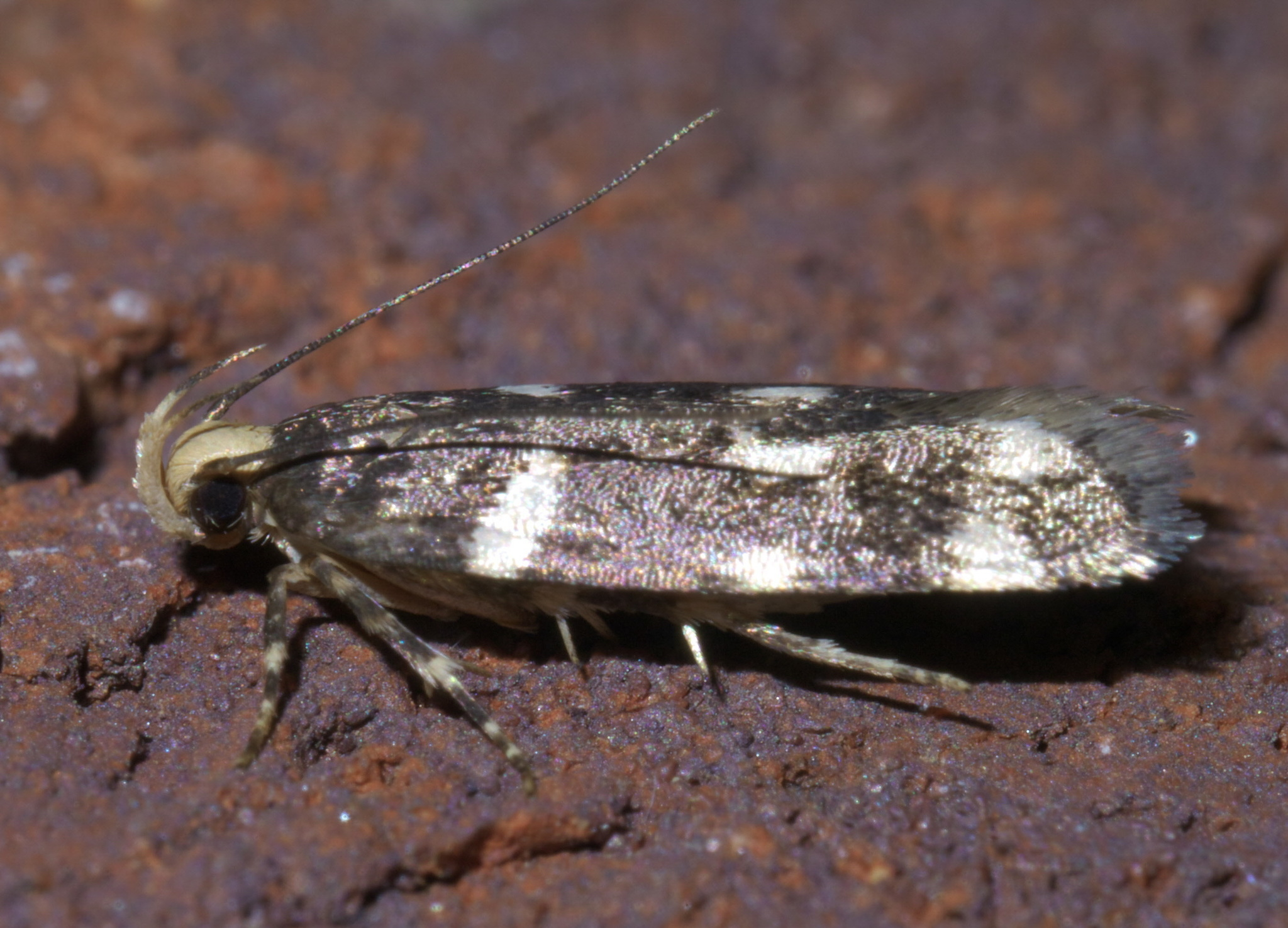
- Fascista quinella, Oklahoma

Scientific classification
- Kingdom: Animalia
- Phylum: Arthropoda
- Clade: Pancrustacea
- Class: Insecta
- Order: Lepidoptera
- Family: Gelechiidae
- Genus: Fascista
- Species: F. quinella

Binomial name
- Fascista quinella (Zeller, 1873)

Synonyms
- Gelechia quinella Zeller, 1873

= Fascista quinella =

Species of moth

Fascista quinella is a moth of the family Gelechiidae. It is found in the southeastern United States, from Texas and Oklahoma to Georgia and Florida.
