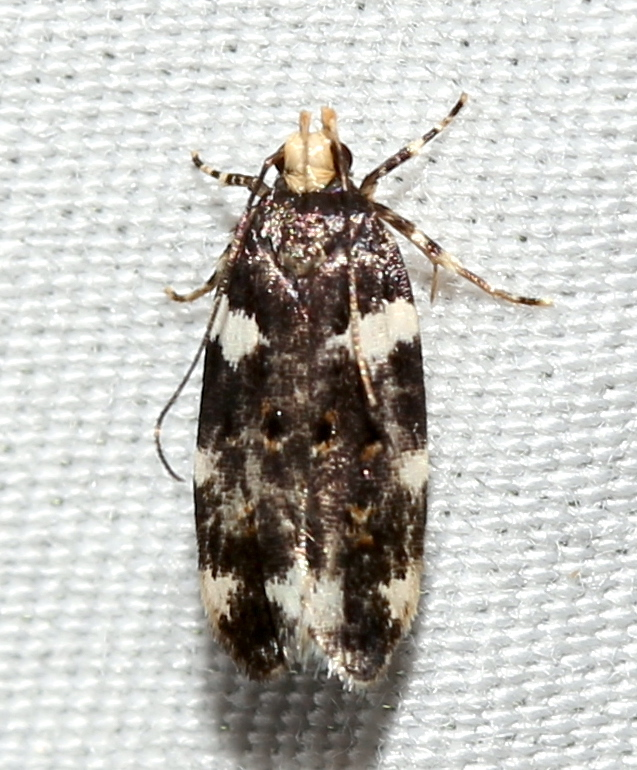
- Adult
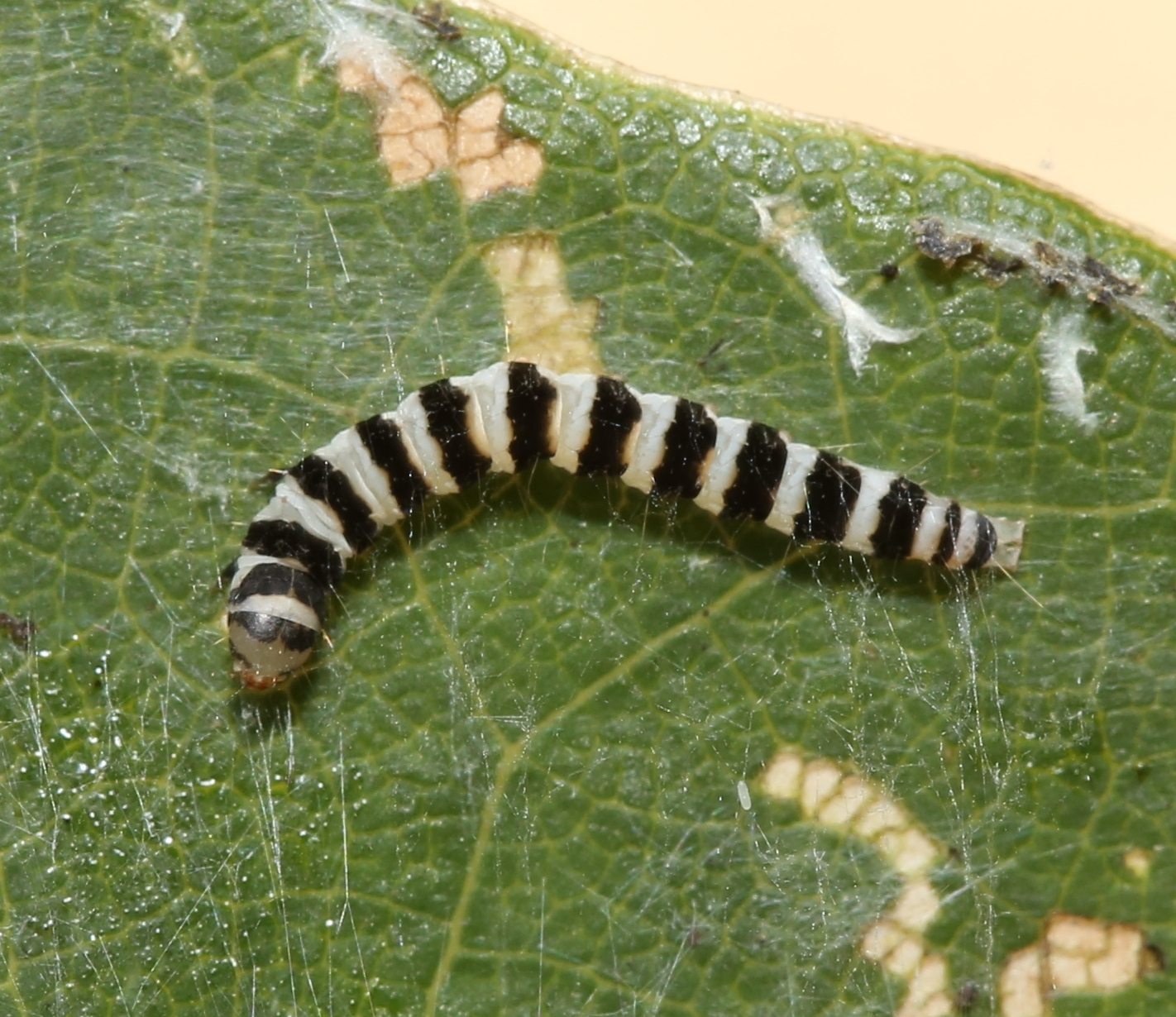
- Larva in leaf-fold on Cercis canadensis

Scientific classification
- Kingdom: Animalia
- Phylum: Arthropoda
- Class: Insecta
- Order: Lepidoptera
- Family: Gelechiidae
- Genus: Fascista
- Species: F. cercerisella

Binomial name
- Fascista cercerisella (Chambers, 1872)

Synonyms
- Depressaria cercerisella Chambers, 1872; Gelechia olympiadella Zeller, 1873

= Fascista cercerisella =

Species of moth

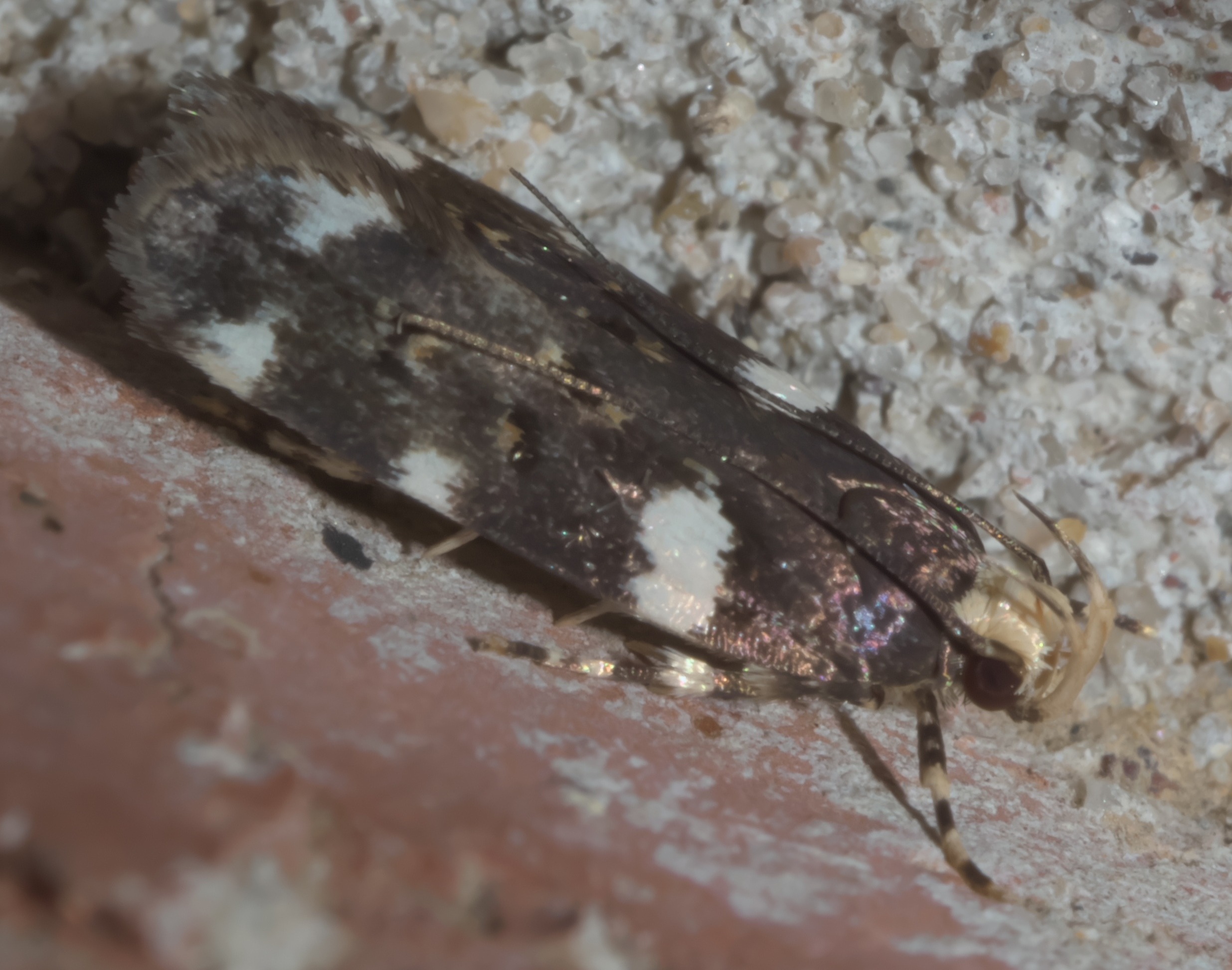
Fascista cercerisella, redbud leaffolder, Size: 7.6 mm

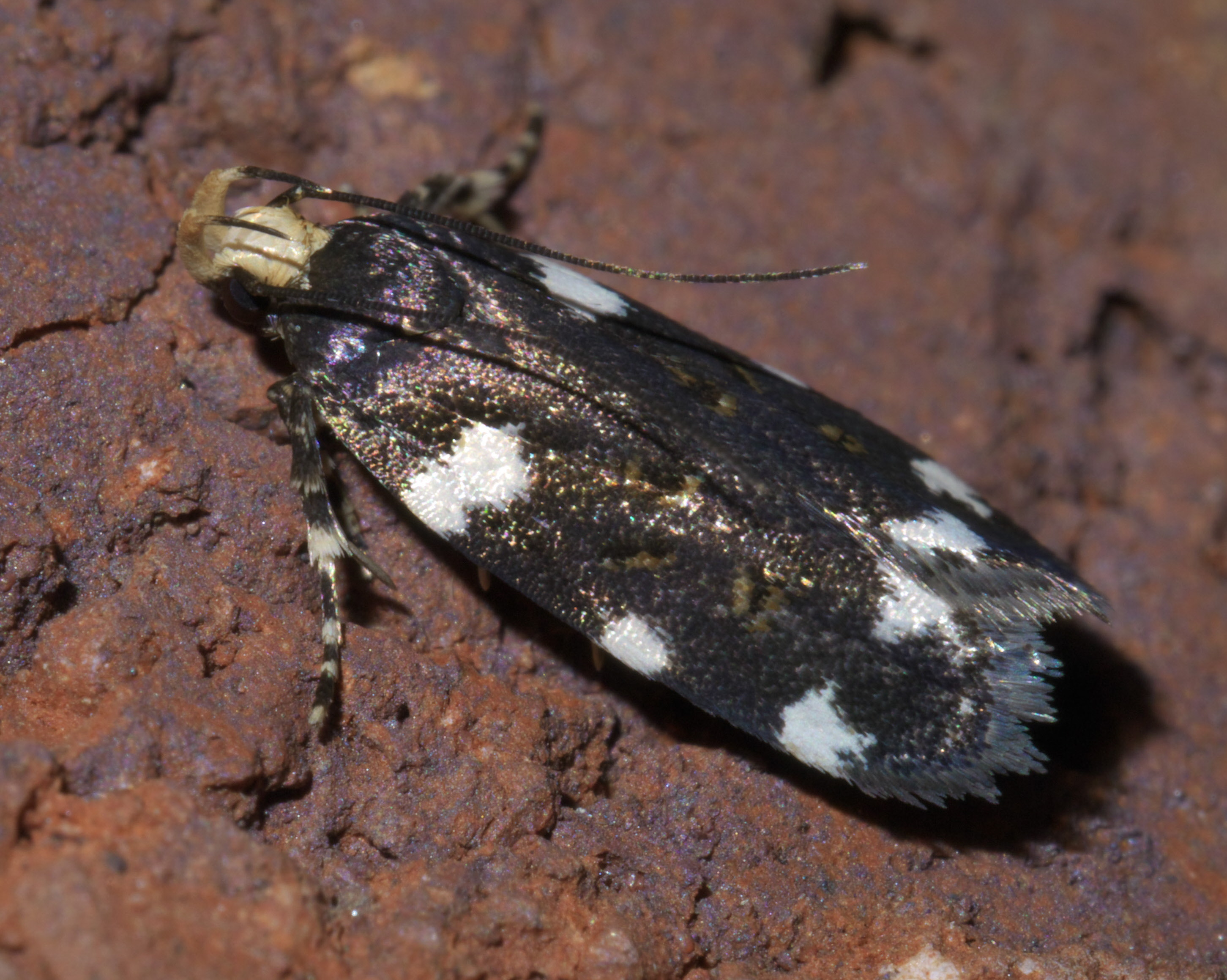
Fascista cercerisella, redbud leaffolder, Size: 8 mm

Fascista cercerisella (redbud leaffolder) is a moth of the family Gelechiidae. It is found in the United States from Pennsylvania and Maryland, south to Florida, west to Texas, north to Kansas.

The wingspan is 13–16 mm. Adults are on wing from April to October in the south. The flight season is shorter in the northern part of the range. There is one generation per year in the north, possibly two in the south.

The larvae feed on Cercis canadensis. They skeletonize the leaves of their host.
