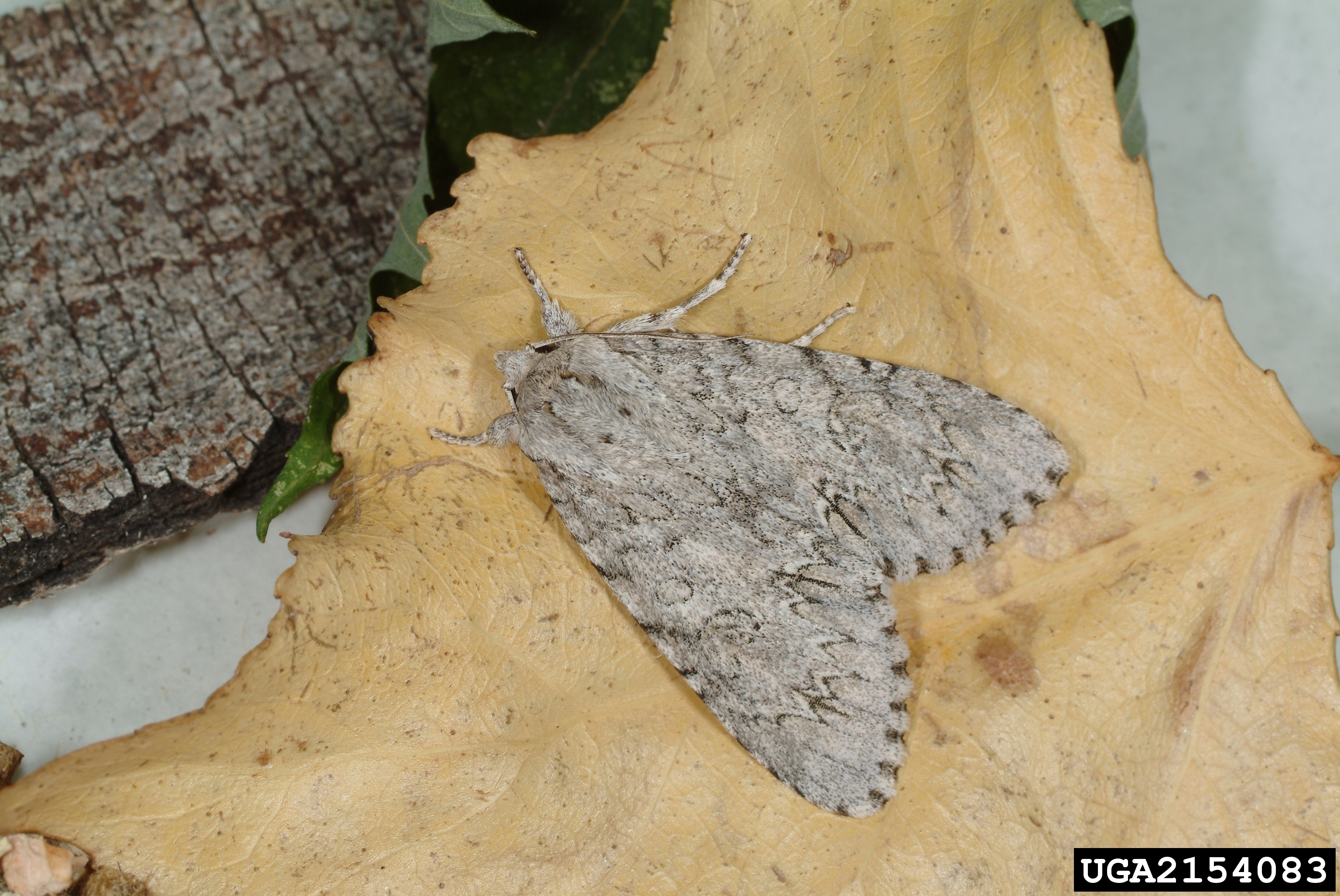

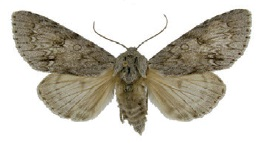

Scientific classification
- Kingdom: Animalia
- Phylum: Arthropoda
- Clade: Pancrustacea
- Class: Insecta
- Order: Lepidoptera
- Superfamily: Noctuoidea
- Family: Noctuidae
- Genus: Acronicta
- Species: A. americana

Binomial name
- Acronicta americana Harris, 1841

Synonyms
- Acronicta acericola

= Acronicta americana =

Species of moth

Acronicta americana, the American dagger moth, is a moth of the family Noctuidae. It was originally described by Thaddeus William Harris in 1841 and is native to North America.

== Description ==
The American dagger moth has a wingspan of 50 to 65 mm (2.0 to 2.6 in) It usually has a sharp, double postmedian line, with white in between the two lines. There is a black dash on the anal area of the forewing. The hindwing is gray with a faint, darker gray median line in the male. The female is similar, except the hindwing is completely dark.

== Subspecies ==
- Acronicta americana americana
- Acronicta americana obscura
- Acronicta americana eldora

== Distribution ==
The American dagger moth is found in North America east of the Rocky Mountains.

== Flight period ==
The American dagger moth can be seen from April to September throughout its range. Caterpillars can be seen from July to October. It has one brood in the north and two to three broods in the south.

== Habitat ==
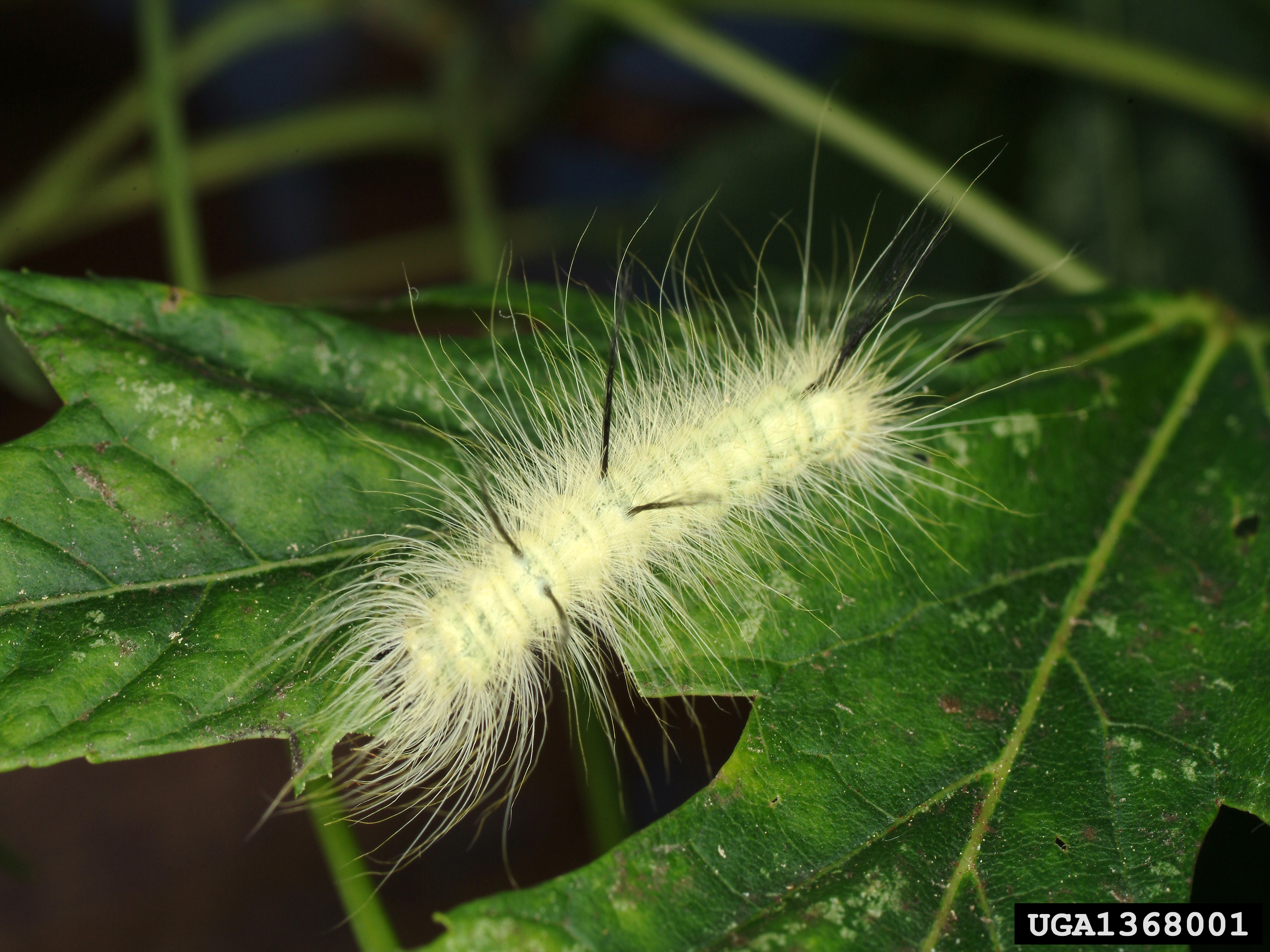
Caterpillar

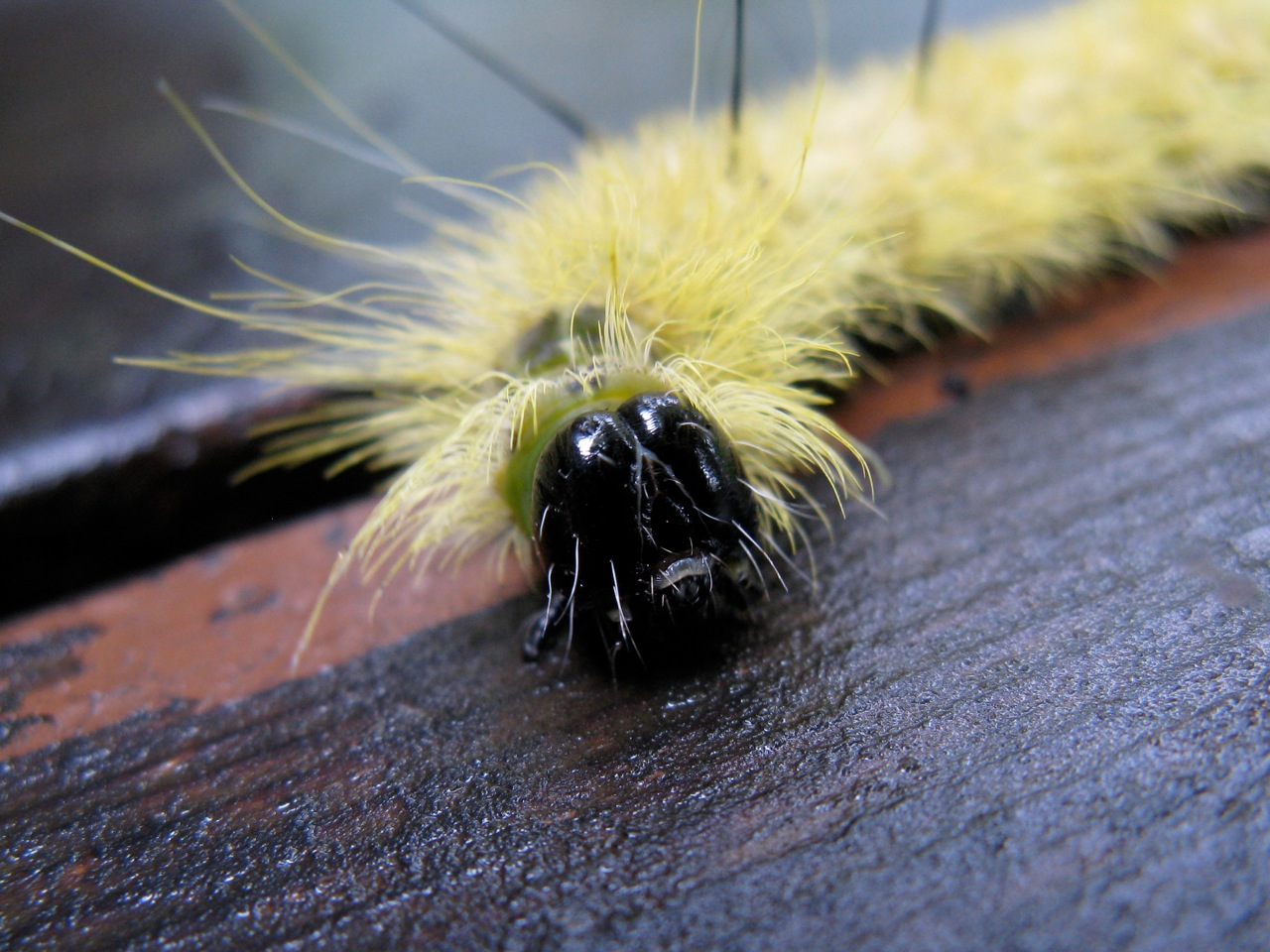
Caterpillar, head

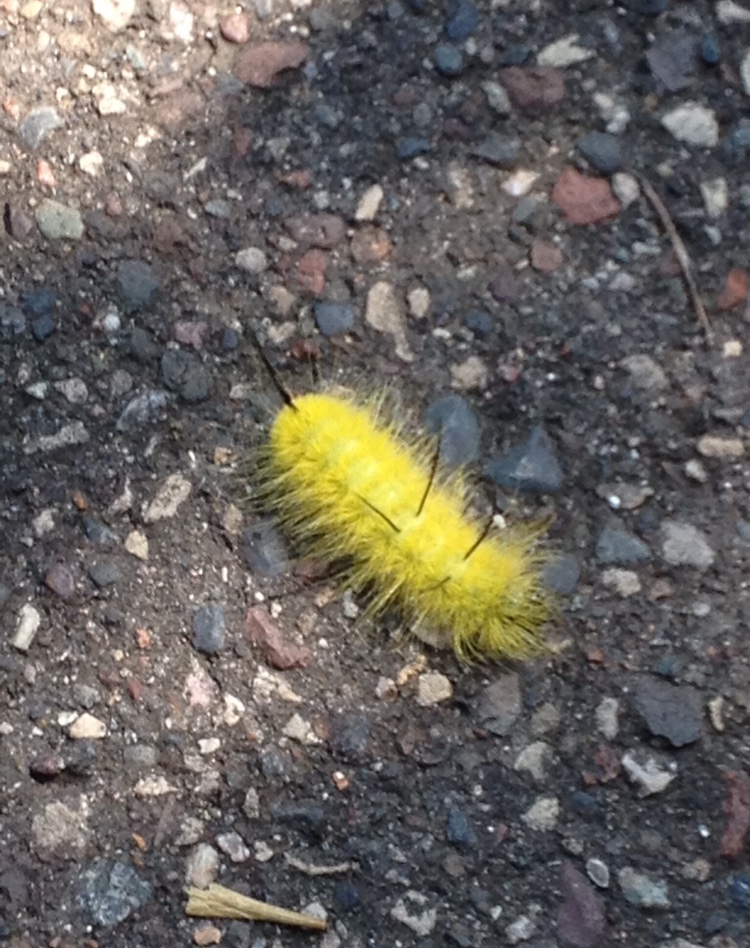

The American dagger moth is found in deciduous woodlands and forests.

== Life cycle ==
The young caterpillar is densely covered with yellow setae. The older caterpillar's setae are either pale yellow or white. All instars have thin, black setae on the first and third abdominal segments. On the eighth abdominal segment, there is one tuft of black setae. The caterpillar will reach a length of 50 mm (2.0 in). While there are numerous reports of the larval hairs of this species sometimes causing skin irritation in humans, there is no evidence that they possess any form of venom.

== Host plants ==
- Acer – maple species
- Acer negundo – box elder
- Aesculus hippocastanum – horse chestnut
- Alnus – alder species
- Betula – birch species
- Carpinus caroliniana – American hornbeam
- Carya – hickory species
- Castanea – chestnut species
- Cercis – redbud species
- Corylus – hazel species
- Fraxinus – ash species
- Juglans – walnut species
- Platanus – sycamore species
- Populus – poplar species
- Quercus – oak species
- Salix – willow species
- Tilia – basswood species
- Ulmus – elm species
