= Blueberry bee =

The name blueberry bee may refer to one of several bee species used to pollinate blueberries:

- The "southeastern blueberry bee", Habropoda laboriosa
- The "Maine blueberry bee", Osmia atriventris
- Osmia ribifloris, native to western North America
