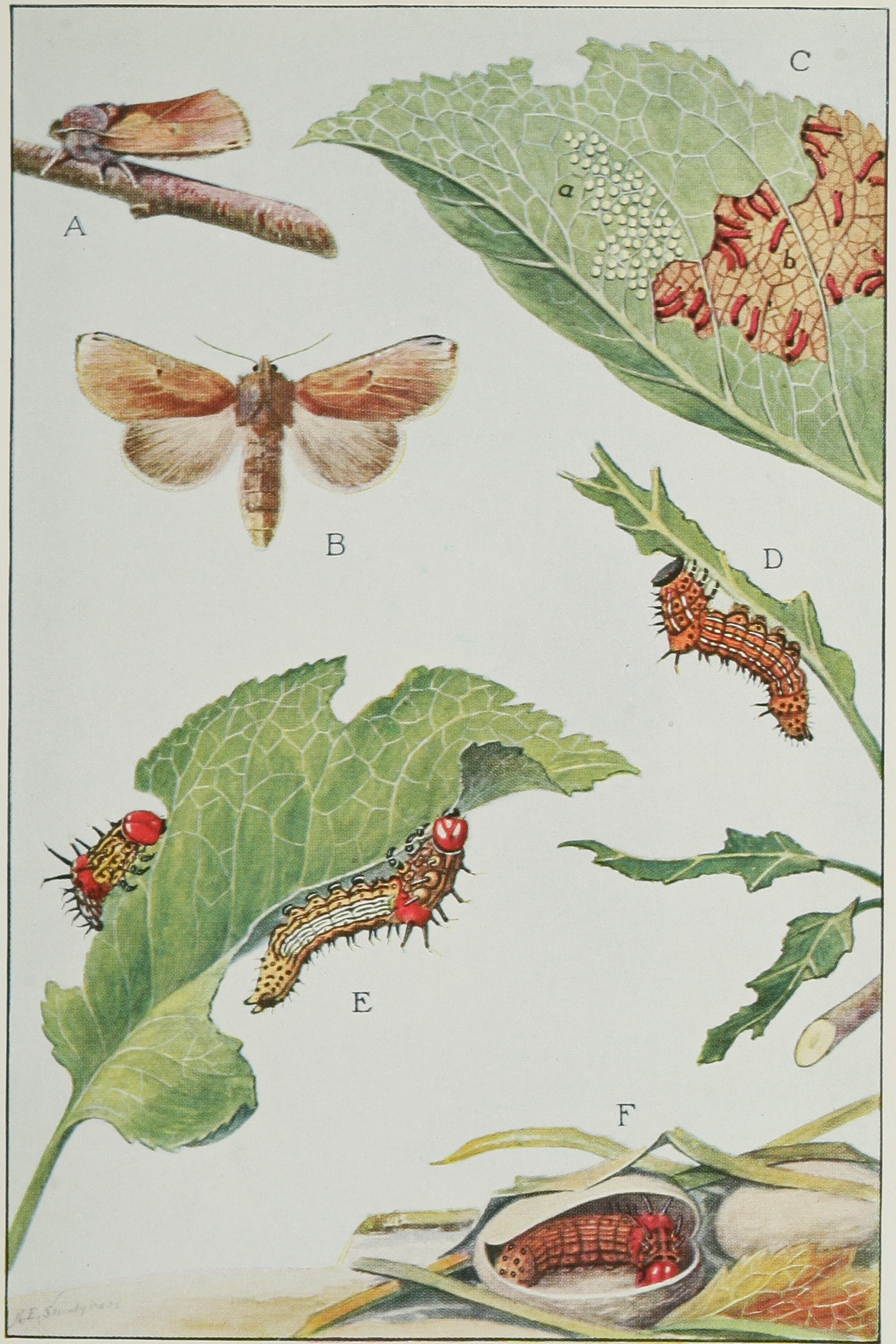

Conservation status
- Secure (NatureServe)

Scientific classification
- Kingdom: Animalia
- Phylum: Arthropoda
- Class: Insecta
- Order: Lepidoptera
- Superfamily: Noctuoidea
- Family: Notodontidae
- Subfamily: Heterocampinae
- Genus: Oedemasia
- Species: O. concinna

Binomial name
- Oedemasia concinna (J.E. Smith, 1797)

Synonyms
- Phalaena concinna J.E. Smith, 1797; Schizura concinna (J.E. Smith, 1797); Schizura nitida (Packard, 1864); Schizura riversii (Behr, 1890); Schizura concinna salicis

= Oedemasia concinna =

Species of moth

Oedemasia concinna, the red-humped caterpillar moth or red-humped caterpillar, is a moth of the family Notodontidae. It is found from southern Canada to Florida and Arizona.

The wingspan is about 30–35 millimeters (1.2–1.4 in). The larvae can grow to 35 millimeters (1.4 in).

It inhabits mesic to wet broadleaf forests, including suburban parks and yards, preferably with open canopies. It is particularly common along forest edges, old fields, and powerlines, and in vernal wetlands, and shrub swamps. The larvae feed on a wide range of woody plants.
