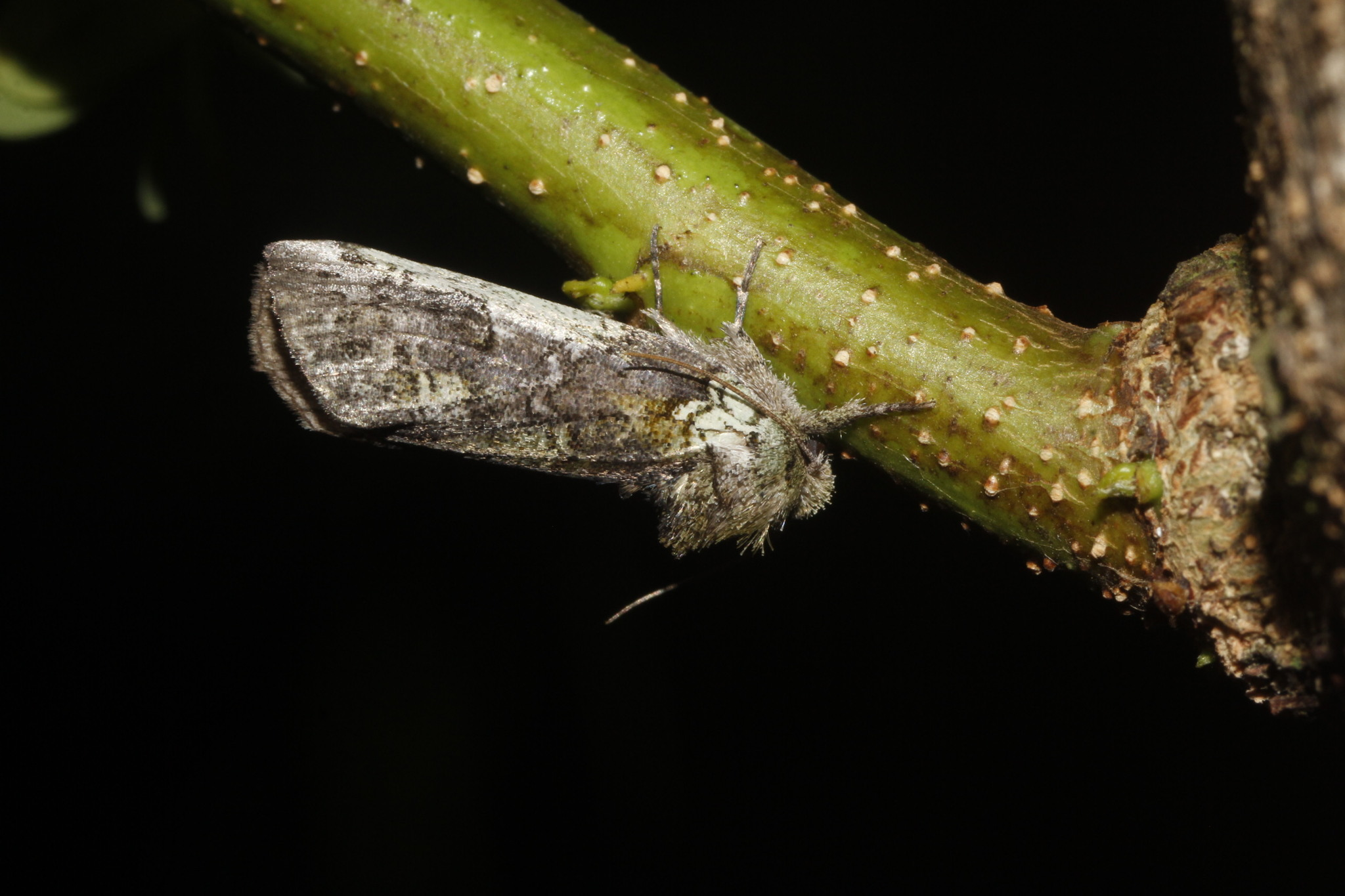
- Coelodasys errucata, Mexico

Scientific classification
- Kingdom: Animalia
- Phylum: Arthropoda
- Clade: Pancrustacea
- Class: Insecta
- Order: Lepidoptera
- Superfamily: Noctuoidea
- Family: Notodontidae
- Genus: Coelodasys
- Species: C. errucata

Binomial name
- Coelodasys errucata (Dyar, 1906)

Synonyms
- Schizura errucata Dyar, 1906

= Coelodasys errucata =

Species of moth

Coelodasys errucata is a species of moth in the family Notodontidae (the prominents). It was first described by Harrison Gray Dyar Jr. in 1906, and is found in North America.

The MONA or Hodges number for Coelodasys errucata is 8008.

This species was formerly a member of the genus Schizura, but was transferred to Coelodasys as a result of research published in 2021.
