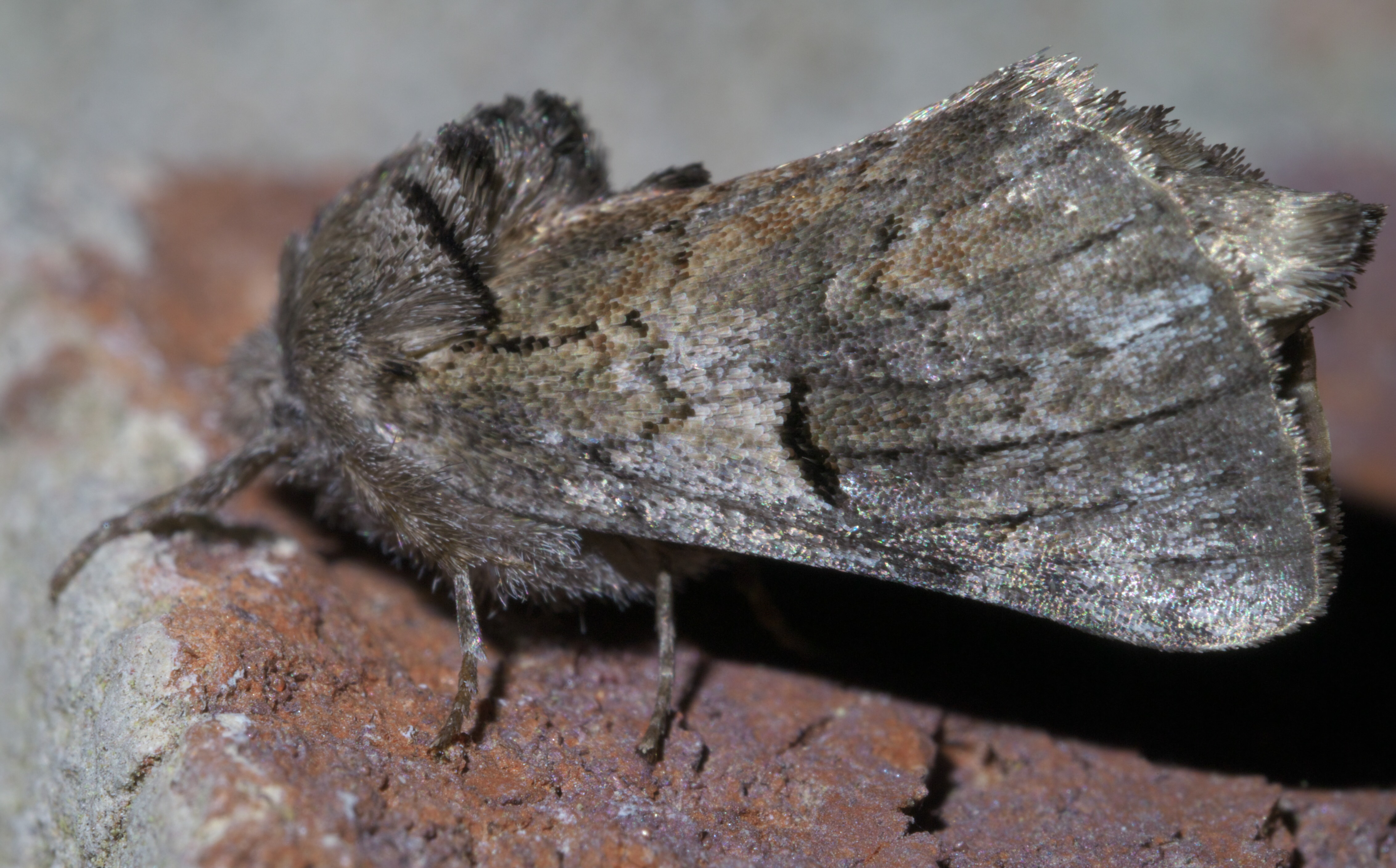

Scientific classification
- Kingdom: Animalia
- Phylum: Arthropoda
- Clade: Pancrustacea
- Class: Insecta
- Order: Lepidoptera
- Superfamily: Noctuoidea
- Family: Notodontidae
- Subfamily: Heterocampinae
- Genus: Coelodasys
- Species: C. apicalis

Binomial name
- Coelodasys apicalis (Grote & Robinson, 1866)

Synonyms
- Schizura apicalis (Grote & Robinson, 1866)

= Coelodasys apicalis =

Species of moth

Coelodasys apicalis, the plain schizura, is a species of moth in the family Notodontidae (the prominents). It was first described by Augustus Radcliffe Grote and Coleman Townsend Robinson in 1866, and is found in North America.

The MONA or Hodges number for Coelodasys apicalis is 8009.

This species was formerly a member of the genus Schizura, but was transferred to Coelodasys as a result of research published in 2021.
