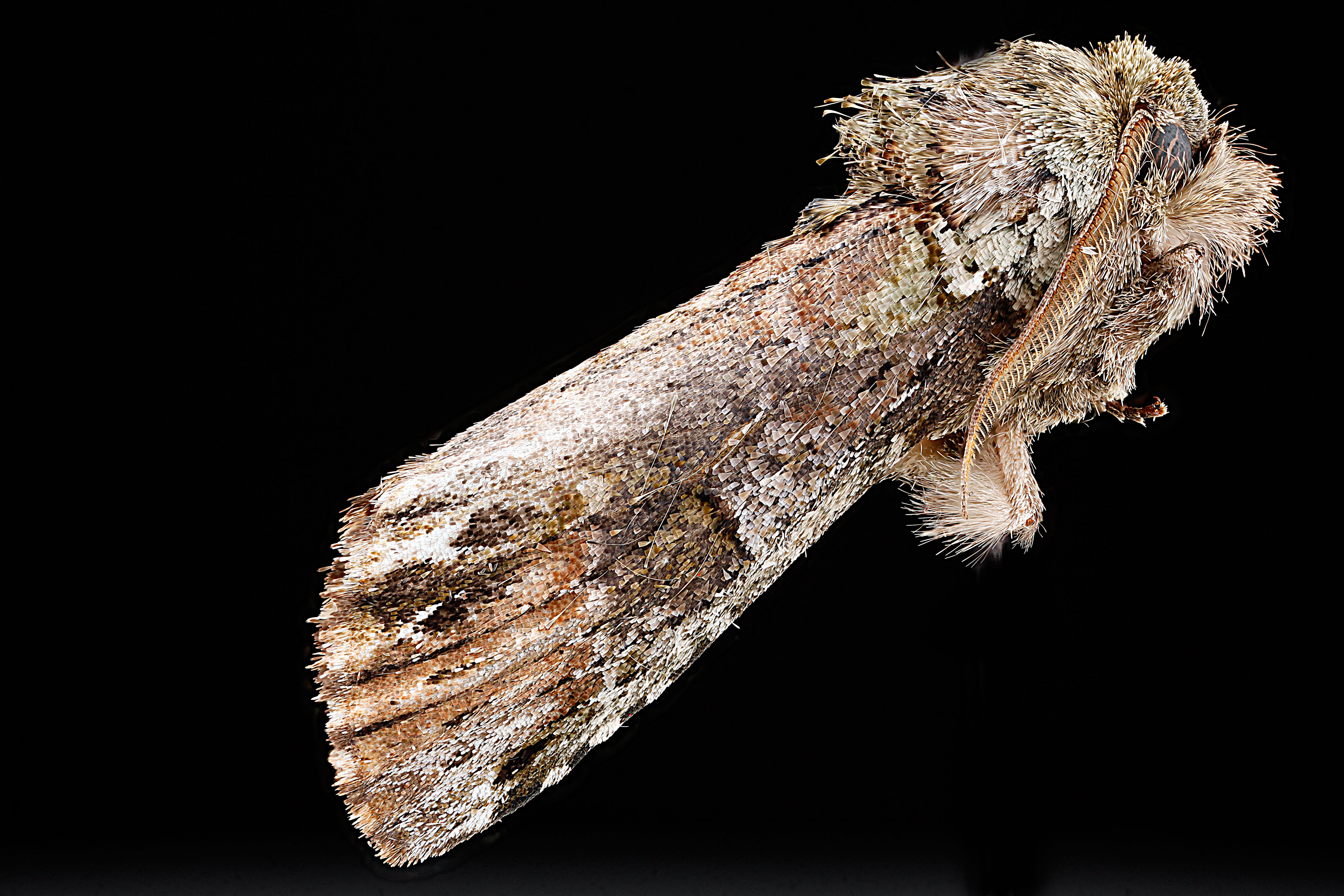

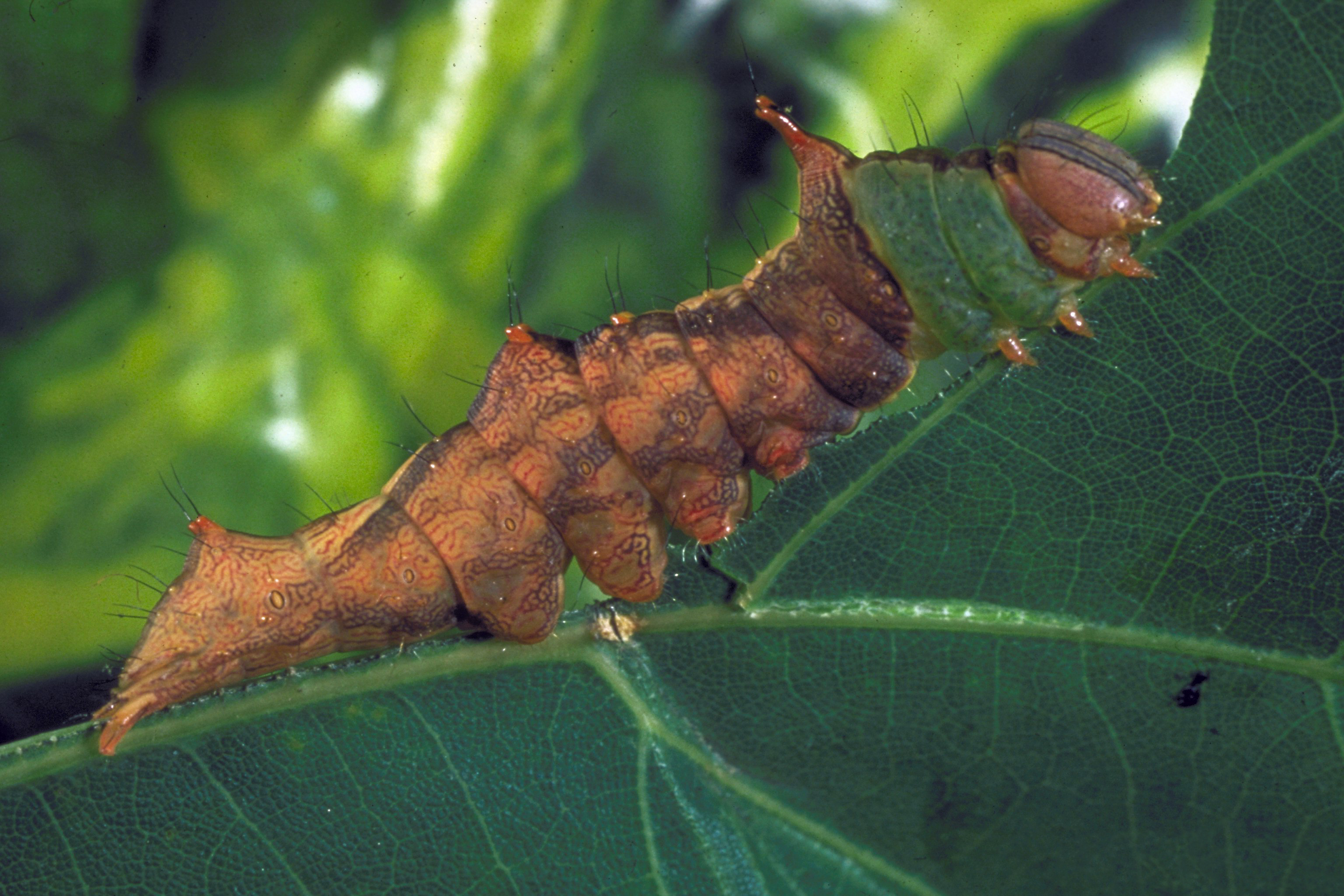
- Adult (top) and larva (bottom)

Scientific classification
- Kingdom: Animalia
- Phylum: Arthropoda
- Clade: Pancrustacea
- Class: Insecta
- Order: Lepidoptera
- Superfamily: Noctuoidea
- Family: Notodontidae
- Subfamily: Heterocampinae
- Genus: Coelodasys
- Species: C. unicornis

Binomial name
- Coelodasys unicornis (J. E. Smith, 1797)

Synonyms
- Schizura unicornis (J. E. Smith, 1797); Phalaena unicornis J. E. Smith, 1797; Coelodasys edmandsii Packard, 1864; Edema semirufescens Walker, 1865; Edema humilis Walker, 1865; Heterocampa conspecta Edwards, 1874; Schizura deserta Barnes, 1929

= Coelodasys unicornis =

Species of moth

Coelodasys unicornis, the unicorn caterpillar moth, unicorn prominent or variegated prominent, is a species of moth in the family Notodontidae. It was first described by James Edward Smith in 1797 and is found in North America south of the Arctic.

The wingspan is 24–35 mm. There is one generation per year.

The larvae feed on Alnus, Malus, Populus tremuloides, Betula papyrifera, Ulmus, Crataegus, Carya and Salix species.

This species was formerly a member of the genus Schizura, but was transferred to Coelodasys as a result of research published in 2021.
