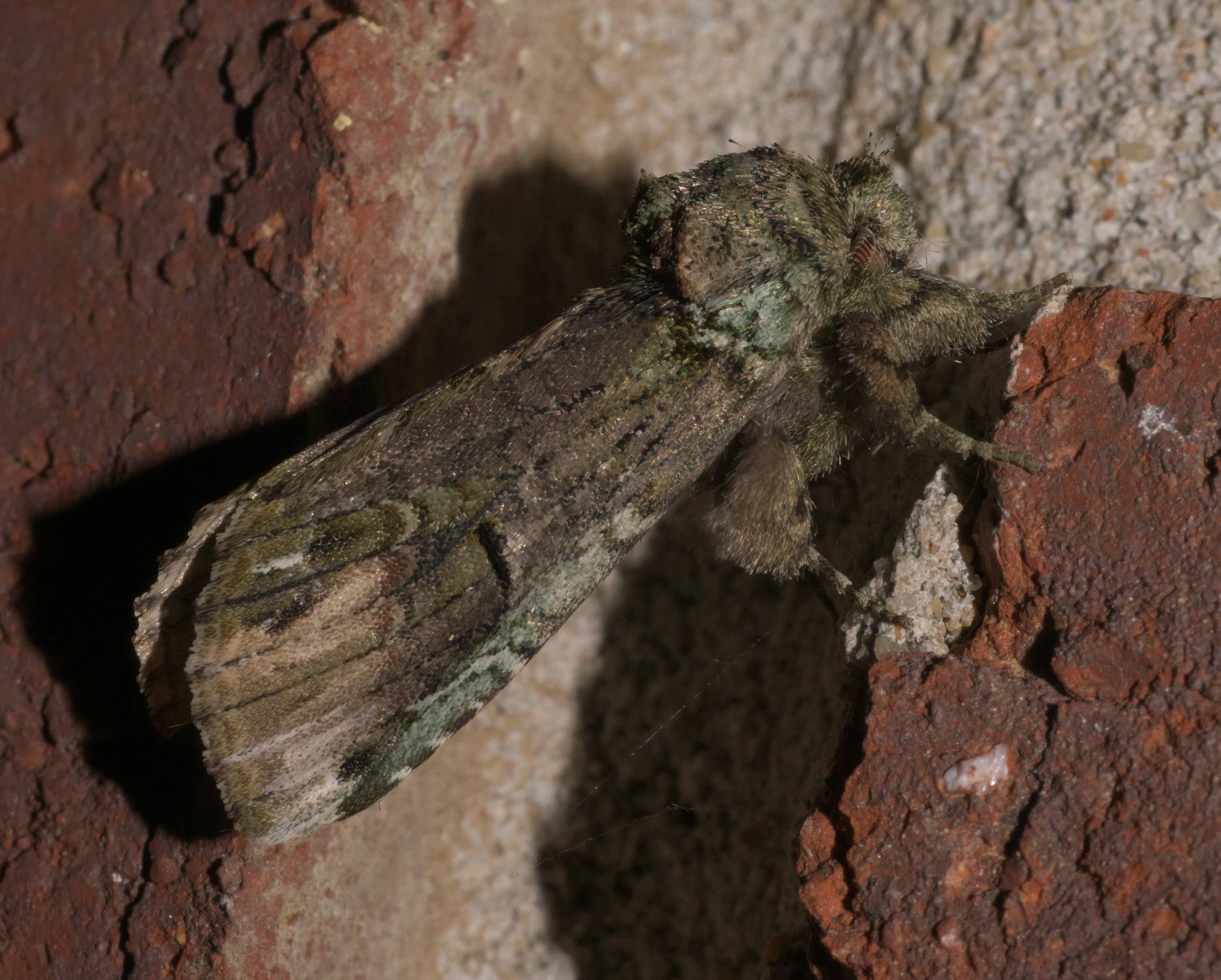
- Coelodasys unicornis, Oklahoma

Scientific classification
- Kingdom: Animalia
- Phylum: Arthropoda
- Clade: Pancrustacea
- Class: Insecta
- Order: Lepidoptera
- Superfamily: Noctuoidea
- Family: Notodontidae
- Subfamily: Heterocampinae
- Genus: Coelodasys; Packard, 1864

= Coelodasys =

Genus of prominent moths

Coelodasys is a genus of prominent moths in the family Notodontidae. There are at least four described species in Coelodasys, found in North America.

== Species ==
These four species belong to the genus Coelodasys:

- Coelodasys apicalis (Grote & Robinson, 1866) (plain schizura)
- Coelodasys conspecta (Edwards, 1875)
- Coelodasys errucata (Dyar, 1906)
- Coelodasys unicornis (J. E. Smith, 1797) (unicorn prominent)
