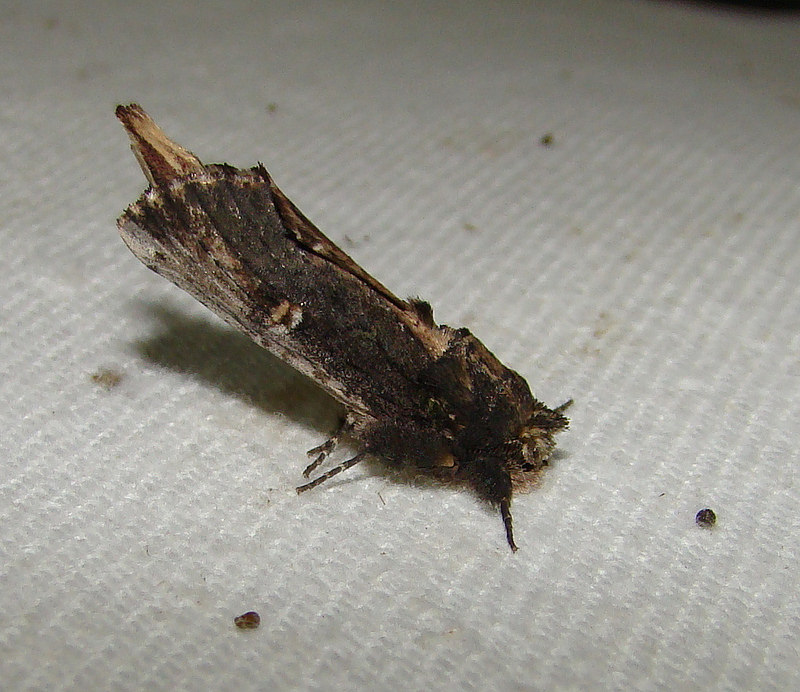
- Adult
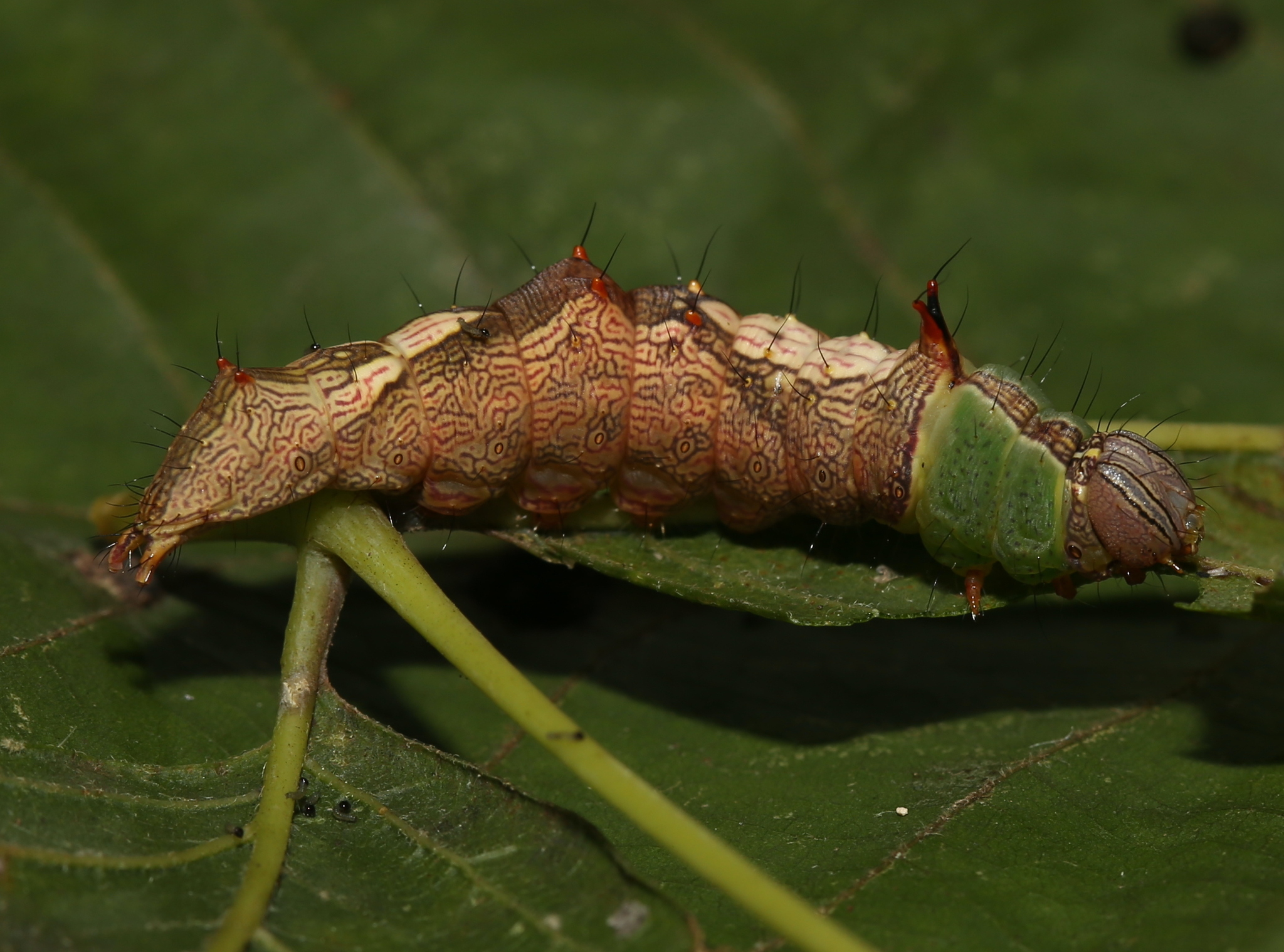
- Larva on Acer negundo

Scientific classification
- Kingdom: Animalia
- Phylum: Arthropoda
- Clade: Pancrustacea
- Class: Insecta
- Order: Lepidoptera
- Superfamily: Noctuoidea
- Family: Notodontidae
- Genus: Schizura
- Species: S. ipomoeae

Binomial name
- Schizura ipomoeae Doubleday, 1841

Synonyms
- Schizura ipomaeae; Coelodasys biguttata Packard, 1864; Coelodasys cinereofrons Packard, 1864; Drymonia confusa Walker, 1865; Heterocampa ducens Walker, 1865; Heterocampa corticea Walker, 1865; Heterocampa compta Walker, 1865; Heterocampa nigrosignata Walker, 1865; Heterocampa ustipennis Walker, 1865; Coelodasys telifer Grote, 1880

= Schizura ipomoeae =

Species of moth

Schizura ipomoeae, the morning-glory prominent moth or false unicorn caterpillar, is a moth of the family Notodontidae. The species was first described by Edward Doubleday in 1841. It is found in the United States and southern Canada.

The wingspan is 36–47 mm. Adults are on wing from April to September in the south and from June to August in the north. There is one generation per year in the north.

The larvae feed on the leaves of various woody plants, including Fagus, Betula, Ulmus, Acer, Ipomoea, Quercus, Hamamelis, and Rosa species. Larvae can be found from May to October. The species overwinters in the pupal stage.

== Taxonomy ==
There are a number of described forms.

== Gallery ==
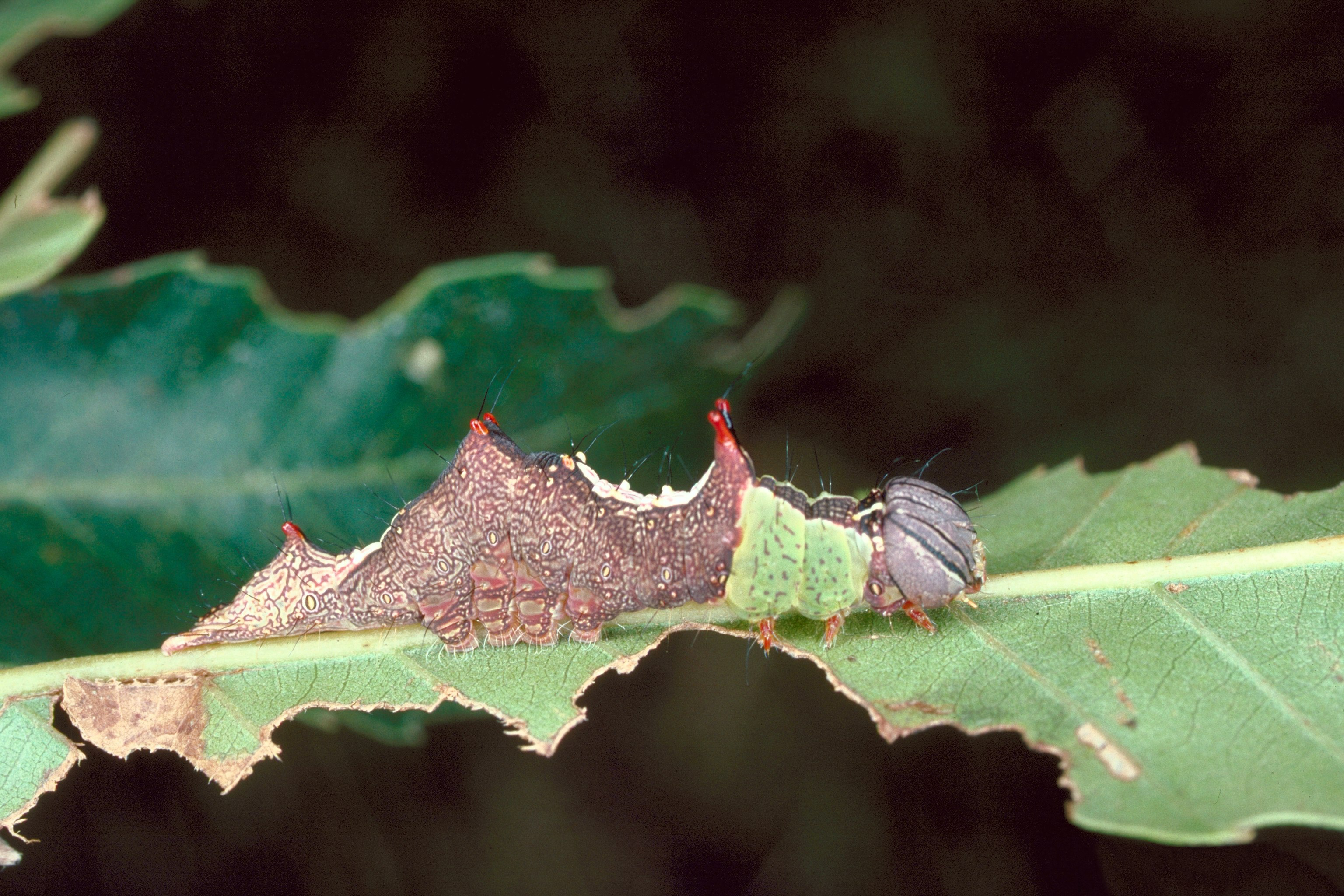
Larva

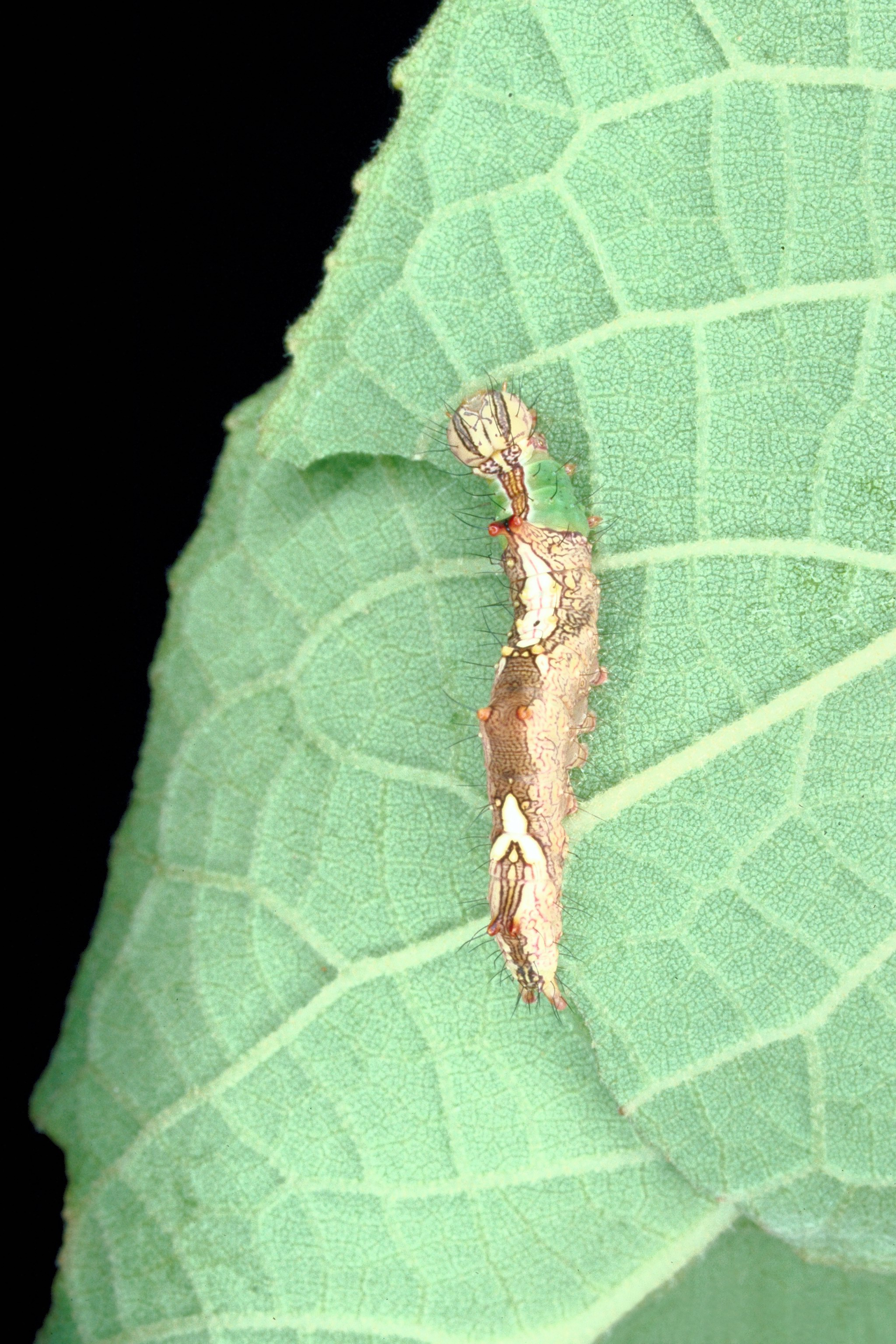
Larva

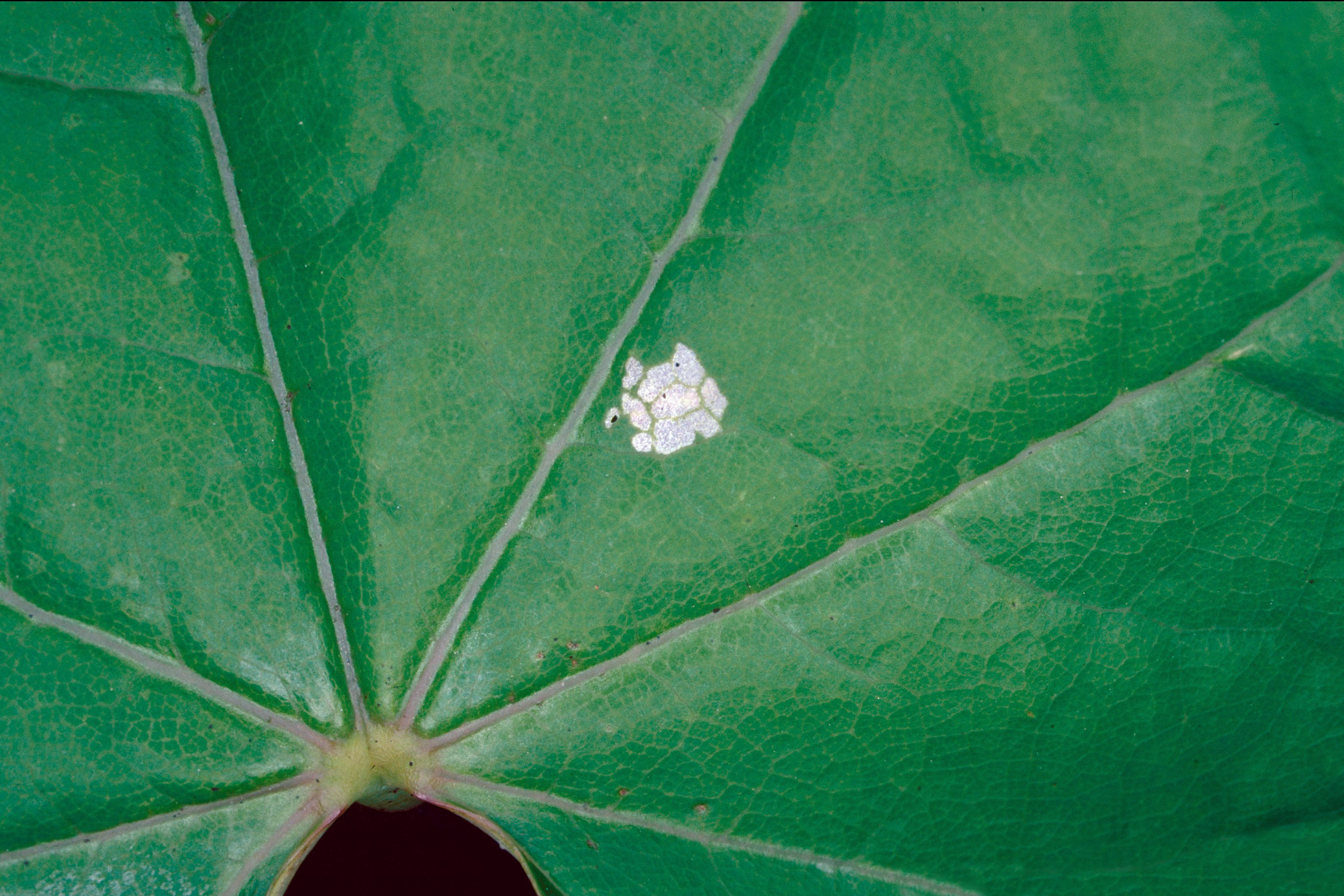
Damage
