= Schizura badia =

Scientific classification
- Kingdom: Animalia
- Phylum: Arthropoda
- Clade: Pancrustacea
- Class: Insecta
- Order: Lepidoptera
- Superfamily: Noctuoidea
- Family: Notodontidae
- Genus: Schizura
- Species: S. badia

Binomial name
- Schizura badia (Packard, 1864)

Species of moth

Schizura badia, the chestnut schizura, is a species of prominent moth in the family Notodontidae. It is found in North America.

The MONA or Hodges number for Schizura badia is 8006.
