= Schizura biedermani =

Scientific classification
- Kingdom: Animalia
- Phylum: Arthropoda
- Clade: Pancrustacea
- Class: Insecta
- Order: Lepidoptera
- Superfamily: Noctuoidea
- Family: Notodontidae
- Genus: Schizura
- Species: S. biedermani

Binomial name
- Schizura biedermani Barnes & McDunnough, 1911

Species of moth

Schizura biedermani is a species of moth in the family Notodontidae (the prominents). It was first described by William Barnes and James Halliday McDunnough in 1911 and is found in North America.

The MONA or Hodges number for Schizura biedermani is 8004.
