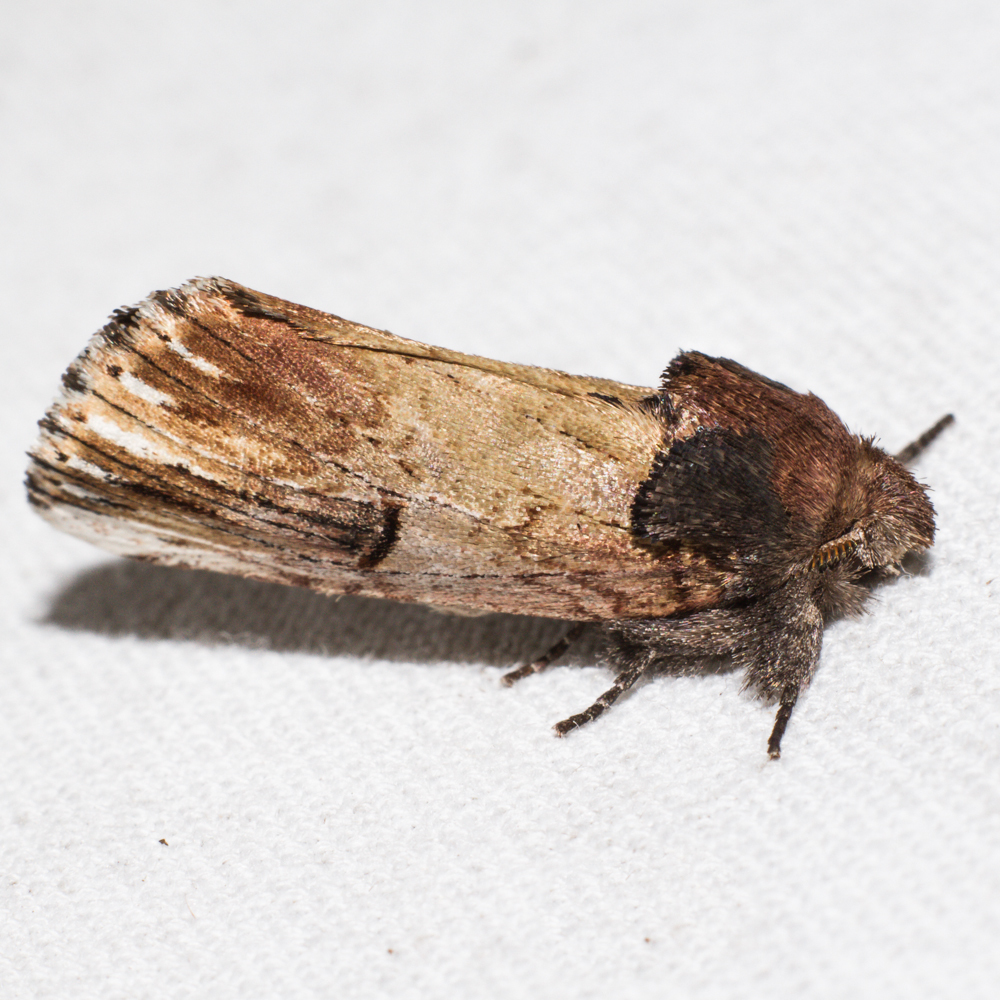
- Schizura badia, Maine

Scientific classification
- Kingdom: Animalia
- Phylum: Arthropoda
- Clade: Pancrustacea
- Class: Insecta
- Order: Lepidoptera
- Superfamily: Noctuoidea
- Family: Notodontidae
- Subfamily: Heterocampinae
- Genus: Schizura; Doubleday, 1841

= Schizura =

Genus of moths

Schizura is a genus of prominent moths in the family Notodontidae. There are about eight described species in Schizura.

Some species in this genus have been transferred to the genera Coelodasys and Oedemasia as a result of research published in 2021.

== Species ==
These eight species belong to the genus Schizura:

- Schizura badia (Packard, 1864) (chestnut schizura)
- Schizura biedermani Barnes & McDunnough, 1911
- Schizura ipomaeae Doubleday, 1841 (morning-glory prominent)
- Schizura madara Schaus, 1939
- Schizura manca Schaus, 1912
- Schizura matheri Miller & Franclemont, 2021
- Schizura obligata (Dyar, 1919)
- Schizura pelialis Schaus, 1937
