= Heterocampa incongrua =

Scientific classification
- Kingdom: Animalia
- Phylum: Arthropoda
- Clade: Pancrustacea
- Class: Insecta
- Order: Lepidoptera
- Superfamily: Noctuoidea
- Family: Notodontidae
- Genus: Heterocampa
- Species: H. incongrua

Binomial name
- Heterocampa incongrua Barnes & Benjamin, 1924

Species of moth

Heterocampa incongrua is a species of moth in the family Notodontidae (the prominents). It was first described by William Barnes and Foster Hendrickson Benjamin in 1924 and it is found in North America.

The MONA or Hodges number for Heterocampa incongrua is 7989.
