= Heterocampa zayasi =

Scientific classification
- Kingdom: Animalia
- Phylum: Arthropoda
- Clade: Pancrustacea
- Class: Insecta
- Order: Lepidoptera
- Superfamily: Noctuoidea
- Family: Notodontidae
- Genus: Heterocampa
- Species: H. zayasi

Binomial name
- Heterocampa zayasi (Torre & Alayo, 1959)

Species of moth

Heterocampa zayasi, the blue moor-grass moth or zaya heterocampa, is a species of moth in the family Notodontidae (the prominents). It was first described by Torre and Alayo in 1959 and it is found in Cuba.

The MONA or Hodges number for Heterocampa zayasi is 7997.
