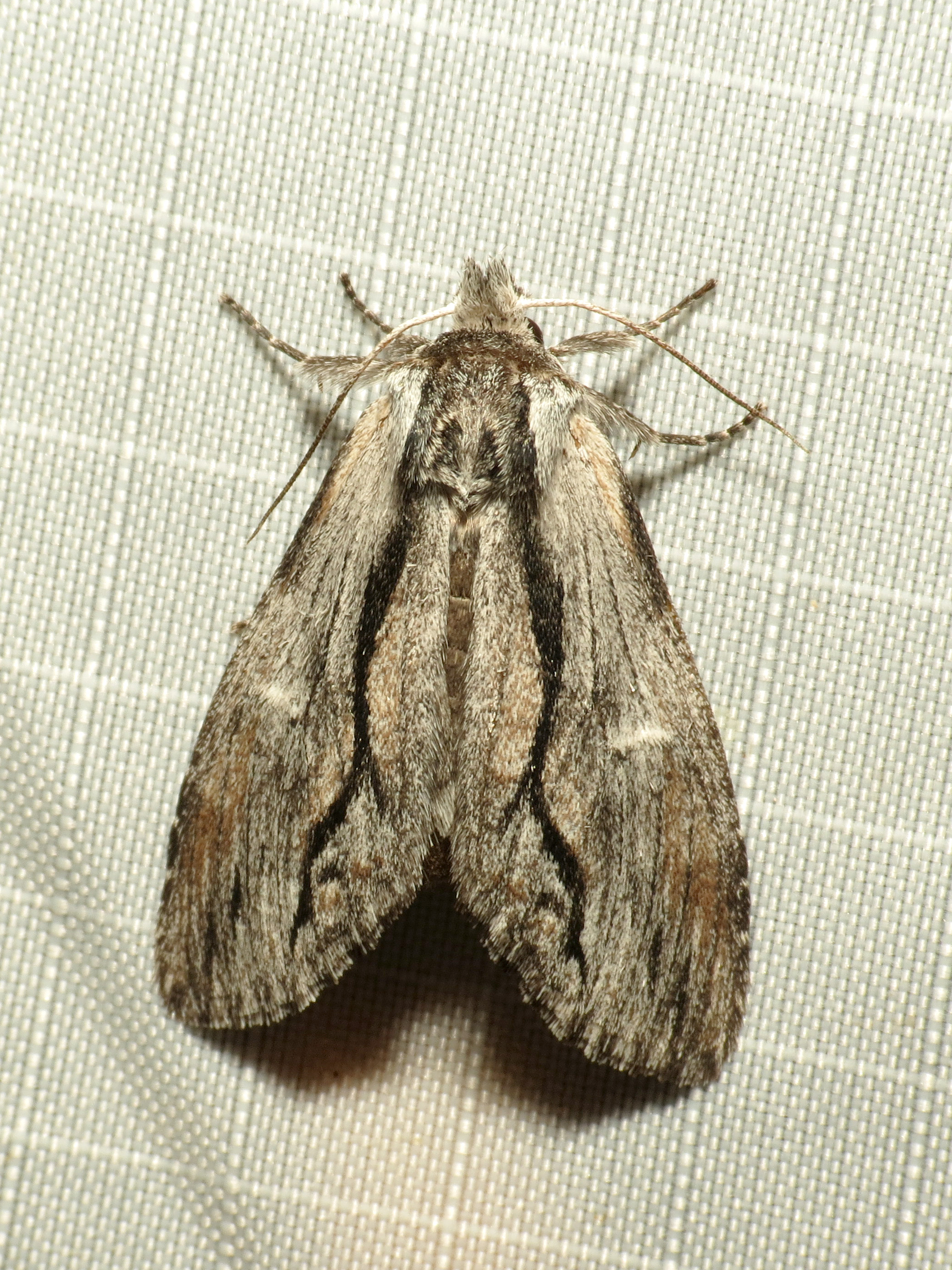
- Notela jaliscana, the only species of the Notela genus

Scientific classification
- Kingdom: Animalia
- Phylum: Arthropoda
- Class: Insecta
- Order: Lepidoptera
- Superfamily: Noctuoidea
- Family: Notodontidae
- Genus: Notela; Schaus, 1901
- Species: N. jaliscana

Binomial name
- Notela jaliscana Schaus, 1901

= Notela =

Genus of moths

Notela is a monotypic moth genus of the family Notodontidae (the prominents). Its only species, Notela jaliscana, is found in North America. Both the genus and species were first described by William Schaus in 1901

The MONA or Hodges number for Notela jaliscana is 7960.
