= Heterocampa cubana =

Scientific classification
- Kingdom: Animalia
- Phylum: Arthropoda
- Clade: Pancrustacea
- Class: Insecta
- Order: Lepidoptera
- Superfamily: Noctuoidea
- Family: Notodontidae
- Genus: Heterocampa
- Species: H. cubana

Binomial name
- Heterocampa cubana Grote, 1866

Species of moth

Heterocampa cubana, the Cuban heterocampa moth or sunflower moth, is a species of moth in the family Notodontidae (the prominents). It was first described by Augustus Radcliffe Grote in 1866 and it is found in Cuba and the US state of Florida.

The MONA or Hodges number for Heterocampa cubana is 7984.
