= Neoplynes cytheraea =

Scientific classification
- Domain: Eukaryota
- Kingdom: Animalia
- Phylum: Arthropoda
- Class: Insecta
- Order: Lepidoptera
- Superfamily: Noctuoidea
- Family: Erebidae
- Subfamily: Arctiinae
- Genus: Neoplynes
- Species: N. cytheraea

Binomial name
- Neoplynes cytheraea (H. Druce, 1894)

Synonyms
- Lithosia cytheraea H. Druce, 1894

Species of moth

Neoplynes cytheraea is a moth of the family Erebidae. It was described by Herbert Druce in 1894. It is found in Mexico.
