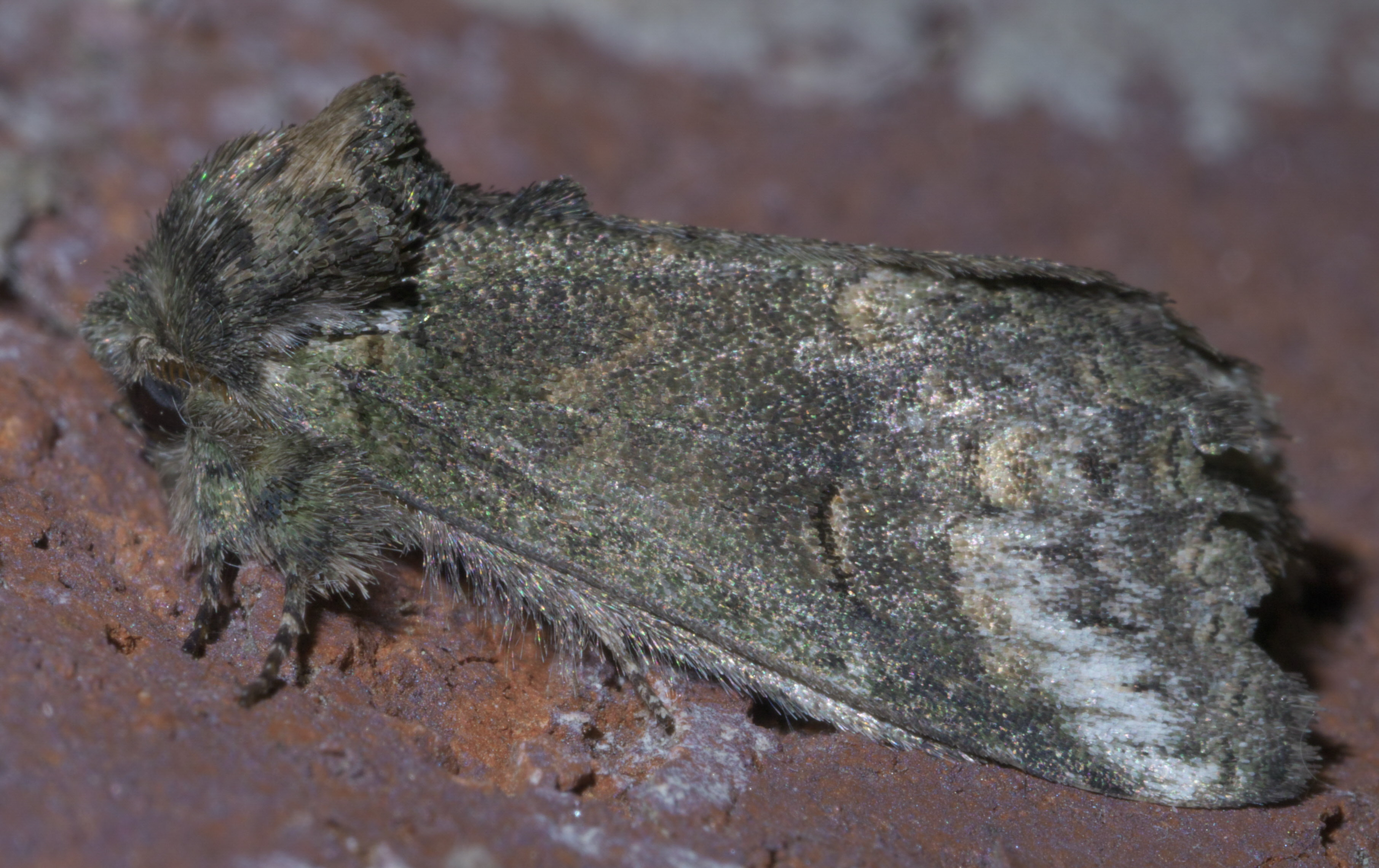

Scientific classification
- Kingdom: Animalia
- Phylum: Arthropoda
- Clade: Pancrustacea
- Class: Insecta
- Order: Lepidoptera
- Superfamily: Noctuoidea
- Family: Notodontidae
- Genus: Heterocampa
- Species: H. subrotata

Binomial name
- Heterocampa subrotata Harvey, 1874

= Heterocampa subrotata =

Species of moth

Heterocampa subrotata, the small heterocampa, is a species of moth in the family Notodontidae (the prominents). It was first described by Leon F. Harvey in 1874 and it is found in North America.

The MONA or Hodges number for Heterocampa subrotata is 7985.

== Subspecies ==
Two subspecies belong to Heterocampa subrotata:

- Heterocampa subrotata celtiphaga Harvey, 1874^{c g}
- Heterocampa subrotata subrotata^{g}

Data sources: i = ITIS, c = Catalogue of Life, g = GBIF, b = BugGuide
