= Heterocampa ruficornis =

Scientific classification
- Kingdom: Animalia
- Phylum: Arthropoda
- Clade: Pancrustacea
- Class: Insecta
- Order: Lepidoptera
- Superfamily: Noctuoidea
- Family: Notodontidae
- Genus: Heterocampa
- Species: H. ruficornis

Binomial name
- Heterocampa ruficornis Dyar, 1905

Species of moth

Heterocampa ruficornis is a species of moth in the family Notodontidae (the prominents). It was first described by Harrison Gray Dyar Jr. in 1905 and it is found in North America.

The MONA or Hodges number for Heterocampa ruficornis is 7996.
