= Didugua =

Scientific classification
- Kingdom: Animalia
- Phylum: Arthropoda
- Clade: Pancrustacea
- Class: Insecta
- Order: Lepidoptera
- Superfamily: Noctuoidea
- Family: Notodontidae
- Genus: Didugua; H. Druce, 1891
- Species: D. argentilinea

Binomial name
- Didugua argentilinea H. Druce, 1891

Genus of moths

Didugua is a monotypic moth genus of the family Notodontidae (the prominents). Its only species, Didugua argentilinea, the silvered prominent, is found in North America. Both the genus and species were first described by Herbert Druce in 1891.

The MONA or Hodges number for Didugua argentilinea is 7961.
