= Pseudhapigia =

Scientific classification
- Kingdom: Animalia
- Phylum: Arthropoda
- Clade: Pancrustacea
- Class: Insecta
- Order: Lepidoptera
- Superfamily: Noctuoidea
- Family: Notodontidae
- Genus: Pseudhapigia; Schaus, 1901
- Species: P. brunnea

Binomial name
- Pseudhapigia brunnea Schaus, 1901

Genus of moths

Pseudhapigia is a monotypic moth genus of the family Notodontidae (the prominents). Its only species, Pseudhapigia brunnea, is found in North America including its type location in Guadalajara, Mexico. The genus and species were first described by William Schaus in 1901.

The MONA or Hodges number for Pseudhapigia brunnea is 8029.
