= Neoplynes =

Scientific classification
- Kingdom: Animalia
- Phylum: Arthropoda
- Class: Insecta
- Order: Lepidoptera
- Superfamily: Noctuoidea
- Family: Erebidae
- Subfamily: Arctiinae
- Subtribe: Phaegopterina
- Genus: Neoplynes; Hampson, 1900

Genus of moths

Neoplynes is a genus of moths in the family Erebidae. The genus was erected by George Hampson in 1900.

== Species ==
- Neoplynes cytheraea (Druce, 1894)
- Neoplynes eudora (Dyar, 1894)
