= Heterocampa benitensis =

Scientific classification
- Kingdom: Animalia
- Phylum: Arthropoda
- Clade: Pancrustacea
- Class: Insecta
- Order: Lepidoptera
- Superfamily: Noctuoidea
- Family: Notodontidae
- Genus: Heterocampa
- Species: H. benitensis

Binomial name
- Heterocampa benitensis A. Blanchard, 1971

Species of moth

Heterocampa benitensis, the spring snowflake, is a species of moth in the family Notodontidae (the prominents). It was first described by André Blanchard in 1971 and it is found in North America.

The MONA or Hodges number for Heterocampa benitensis is 7987.
