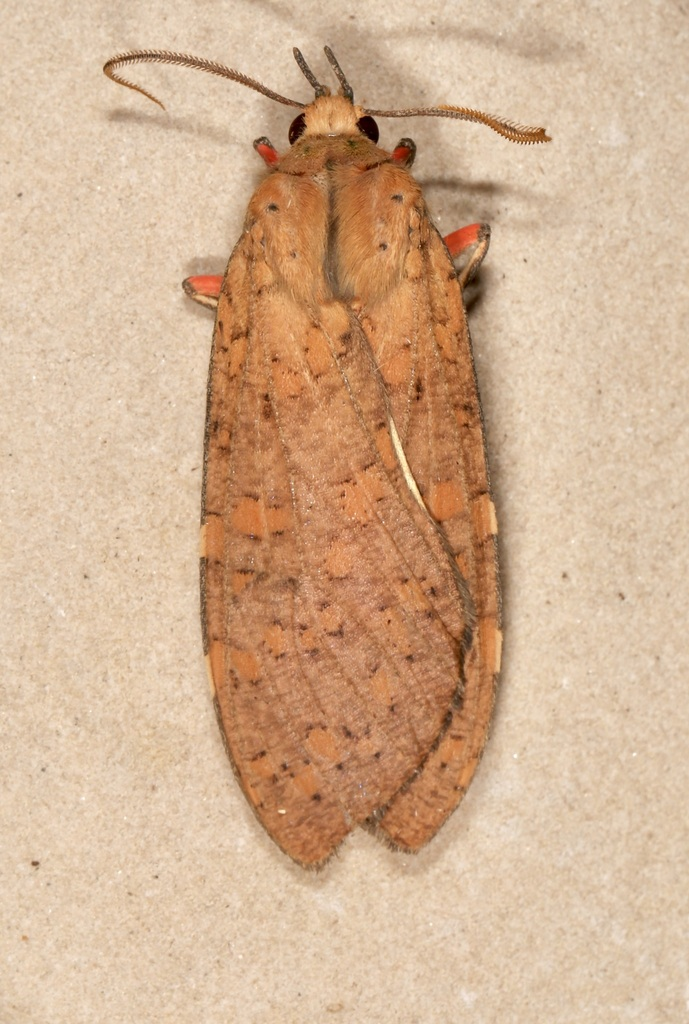

Scientific classification
- Kingdom: Animalia
- Phylum: Arthropoda
- Class: Insecta
- Order: Lepidoptera
- Superfamily: Noctuoidea
- Family: Erebidae
- Subfamily: Arctiinae
- Genus: Apocrisias; Franclemont, 1966
- Species: A. thaumasta

Binomial name
- Apocrisias thaumasta Franclemont, 1966

= Apocrisias =

Genus of moths

Apocrisias is a monotypic moth genus in the family Erebidae. Its single species, Apocrisias thaumasta, is found in the United States in southern Arizona and in Mexico. Both the genus and species were first described by John G. Franclemont in 1966.

The wingspan is 49–56 mm. Adults have been recorded on wing from July to August.
