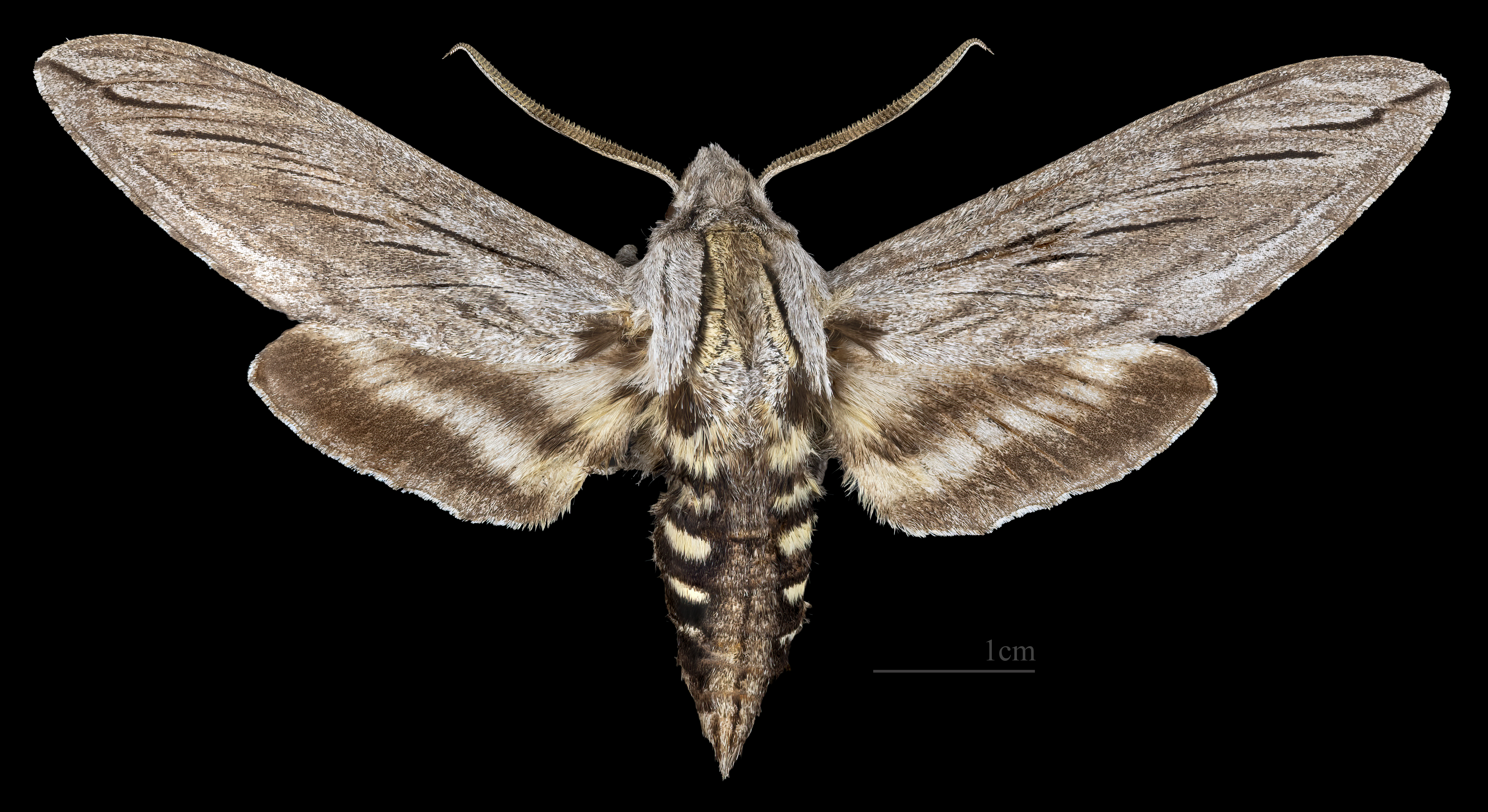
- Sphinx libocedrus ♂
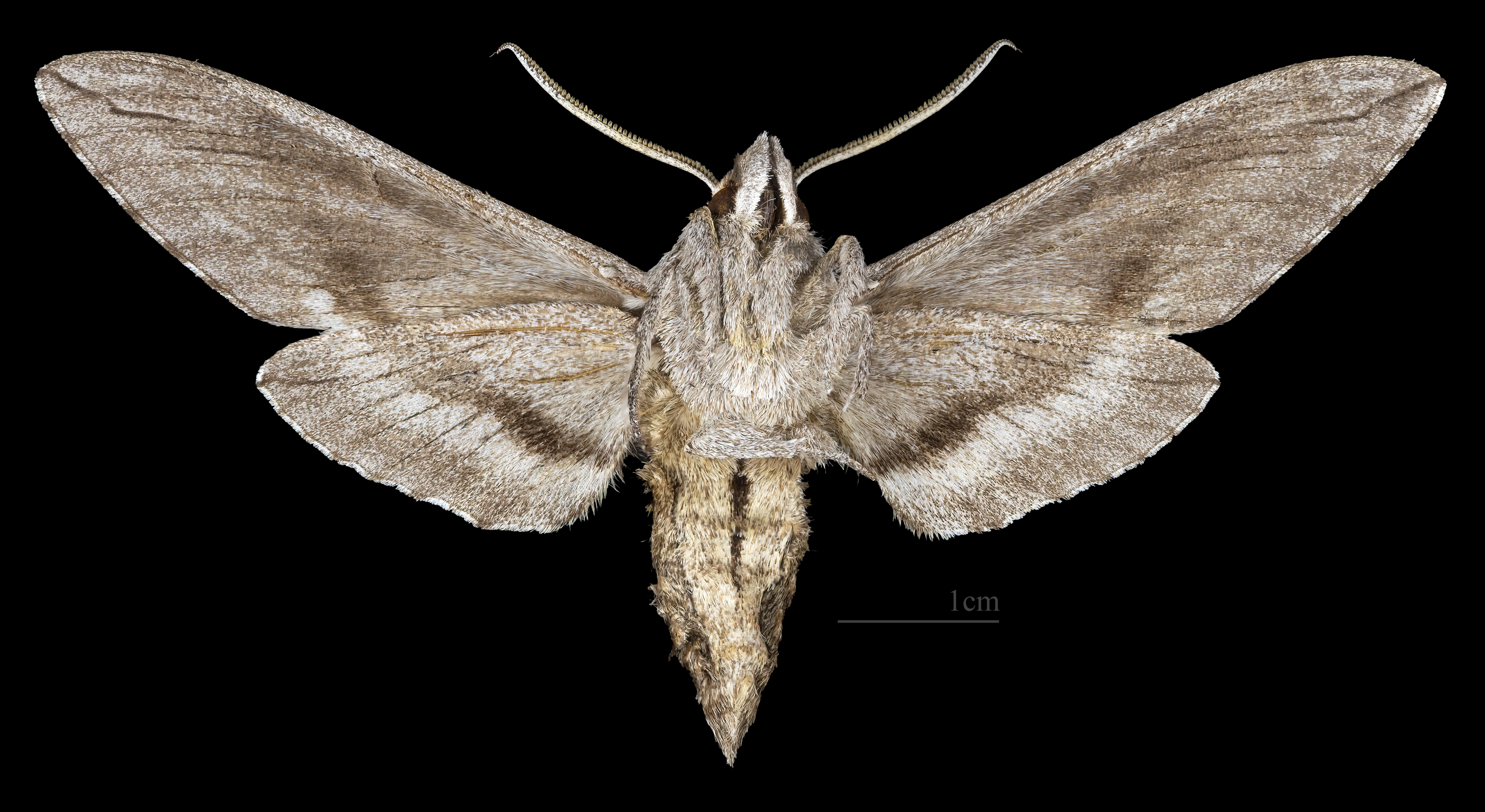
- Sphinx libocedrus ♂ △

Scientific classification
- Domain: Eukaryota
- Kingdom: Animalia
- Phylum: Arthropoda
- Class: Insecta
- Order: Lepidoptera
- Family: Sphingidae
- Genus: Sphinx
- Species: S. libocedrus

Binomial name
- Sphinx libocedrus H. Edwards, 1881

Synonyms
- Sphinx insolita Lintner, 1884

= Sphinx libocedrus =

Incense cedar sphinx

Species of moth

Sphinx libocedrus, the incense cedar sphinx, is a moth of the family Sphingidae. The species was first described by Henry Edwards in 1881. It ranges from the western Texas to southern California and Mexico.

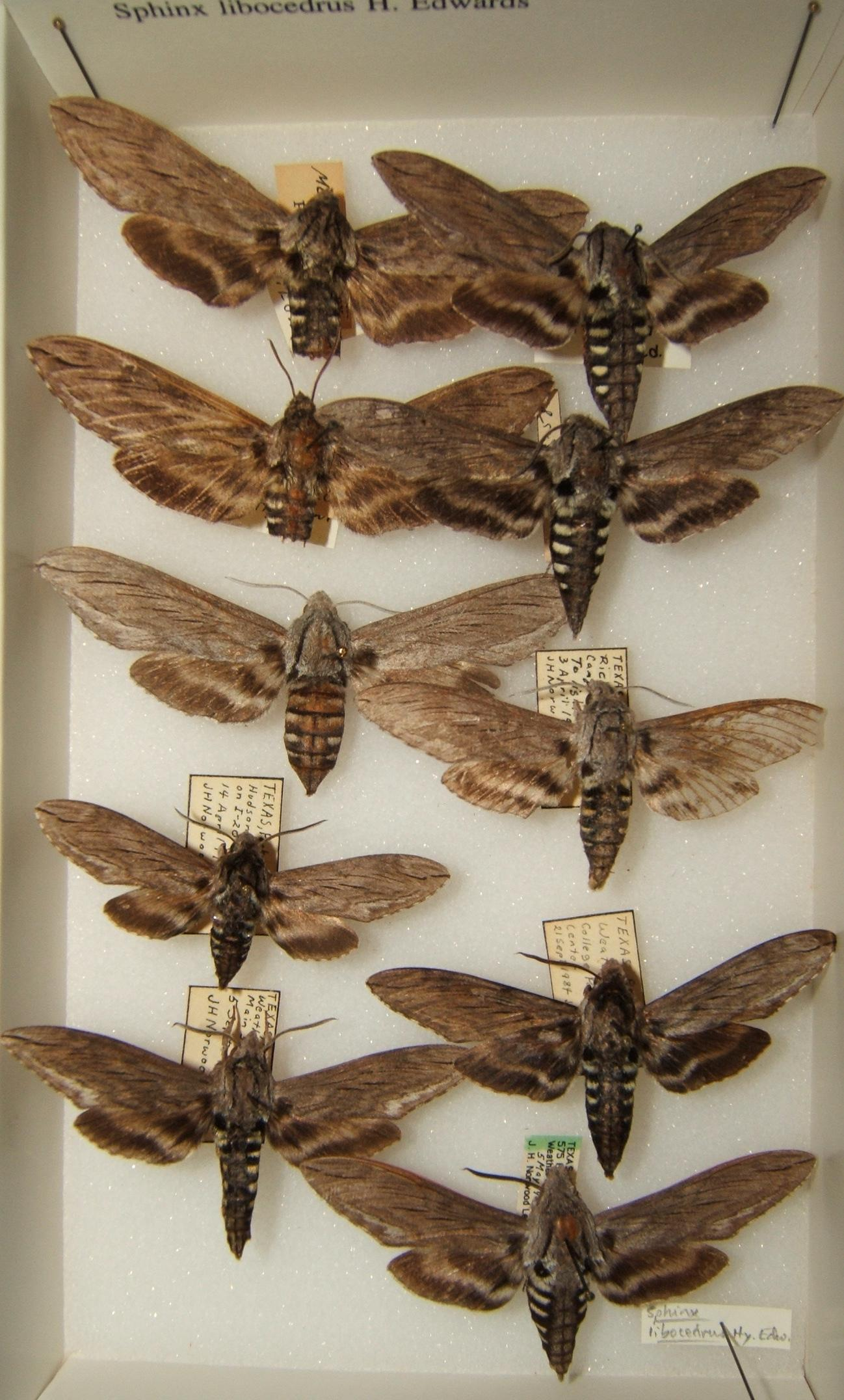
Incense cedar sphinx variation

The larvae feed on New Mexican forestiera (Forestiera neomexicana), Forestiera angustifolia and Fraxinus gooddingii in the olive family (Oleaceae).

== Subspecies ==
- Sphinx libocedrus libocedrus (from Texas west through New Mexico and Arizona to southern California and further south to Sonora and Baja California Sur)
- Sphinx libocedrus achotla Mooser, 1944 (Mexico)
