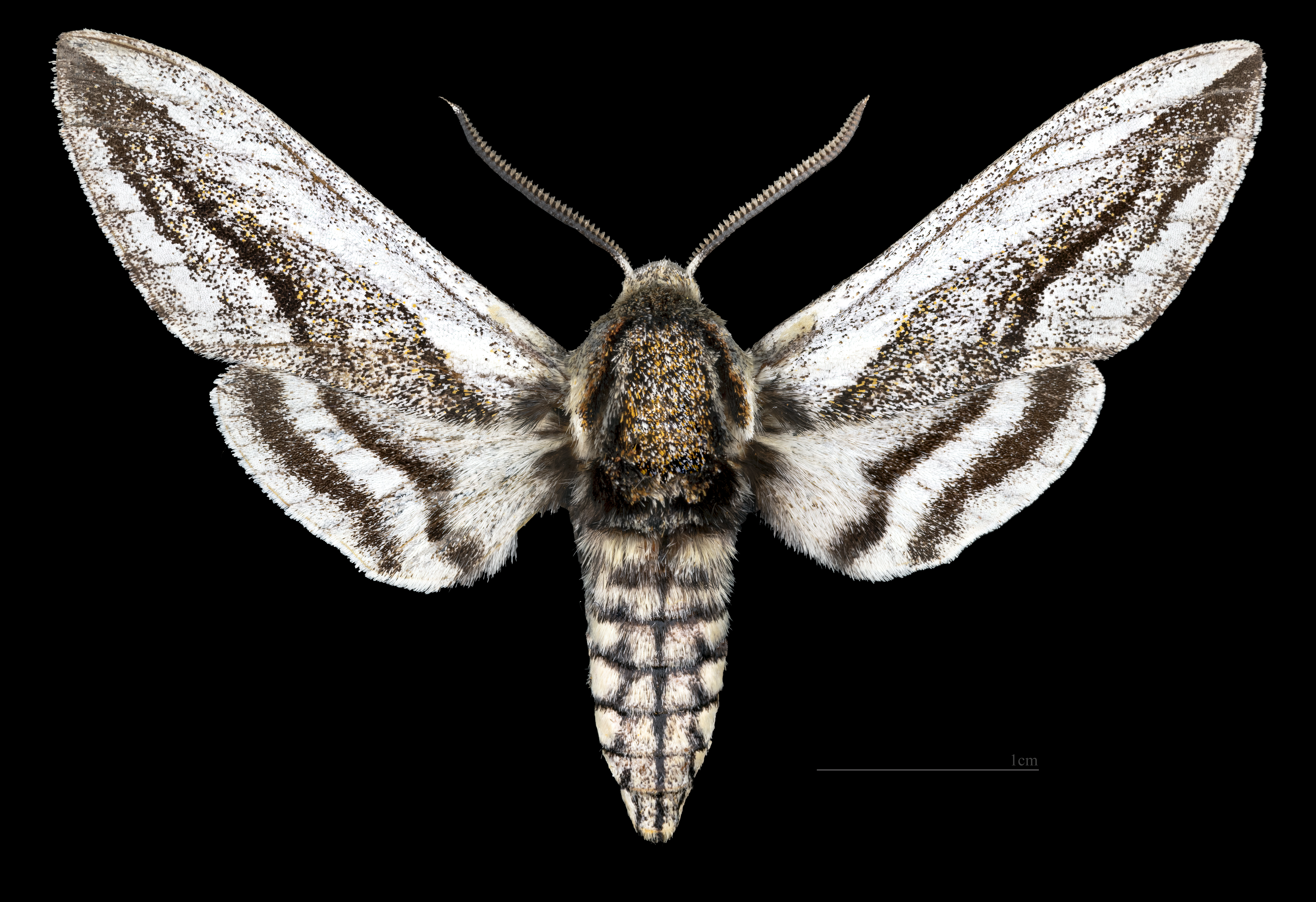
- Sagenosoma elsa ♂
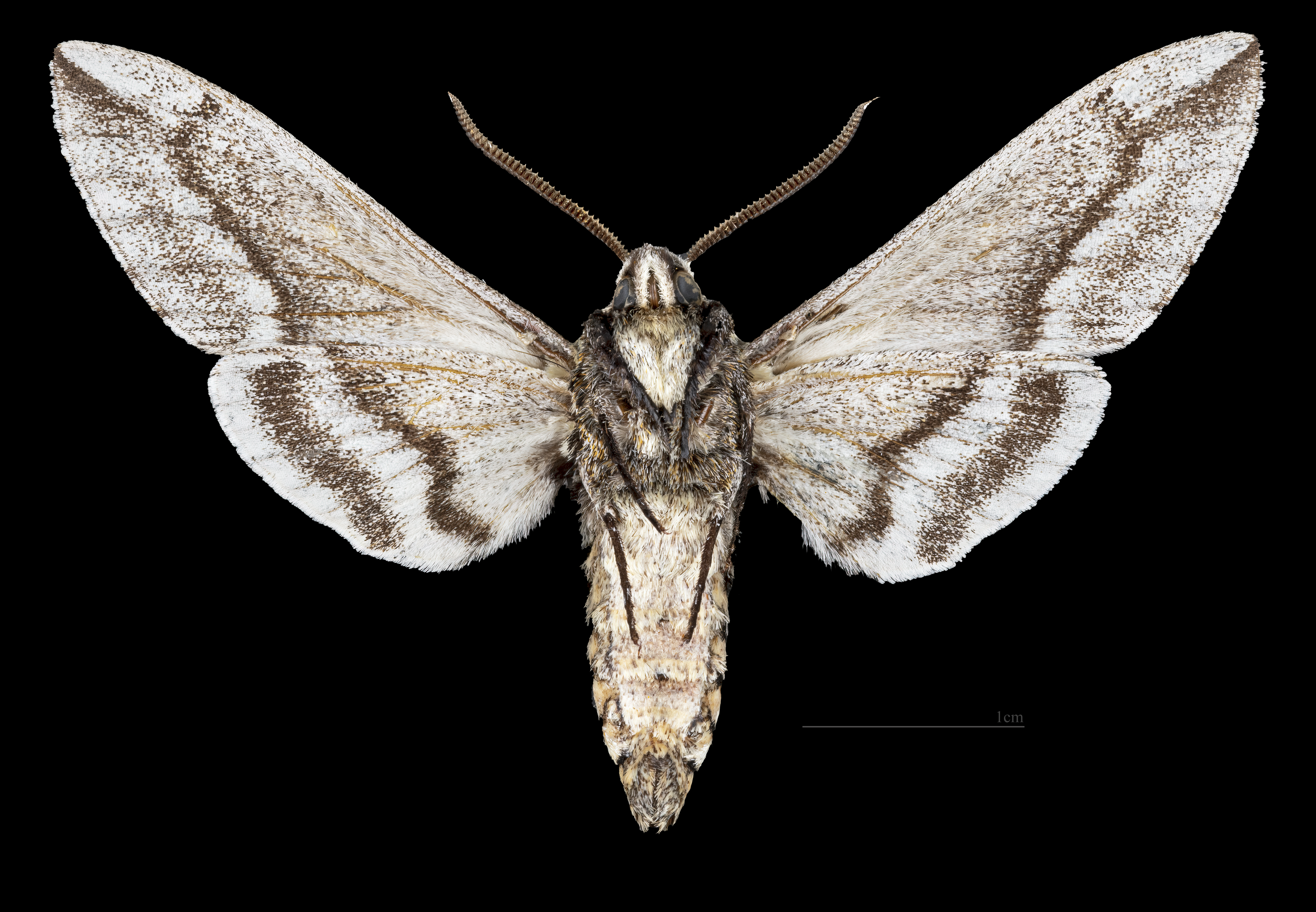
- Sagenosoma elsa ♂ △

Scientific classification
- Domain: Eukaryota
- Kingdom: Animalia
- Phylum: Arthropoda
- Class: Insecta
- Order: Lepidoptera
- Family: Sphingidae
- Genus: Sagenosoma; Jordan, 1946
- Species: S. elsa

Binomial name
- Sagenosoma elsa (Strecker, [1878])

Synonyms
- Dictyosoma Rothschild & Jordan, 1903 (Genus); Sphinx elsa Strecker, 1878 (Species)

= Sagenosoma =

Genus of moths

Sagenosoma is a genus of moths in the family Sphingidae, containing only one species, the elsa sphinx moth (Sagenosoma elsa), which is known from the south-western United States (Arizona, western New Mexico, southern Utah and Colorado) and northern Mexico.

The length of the forewings is 23–38 mm. Adults are on wing from mid April to mid August, in either one or two generations.

The larvae have been recorded on Lycium pallidum.
