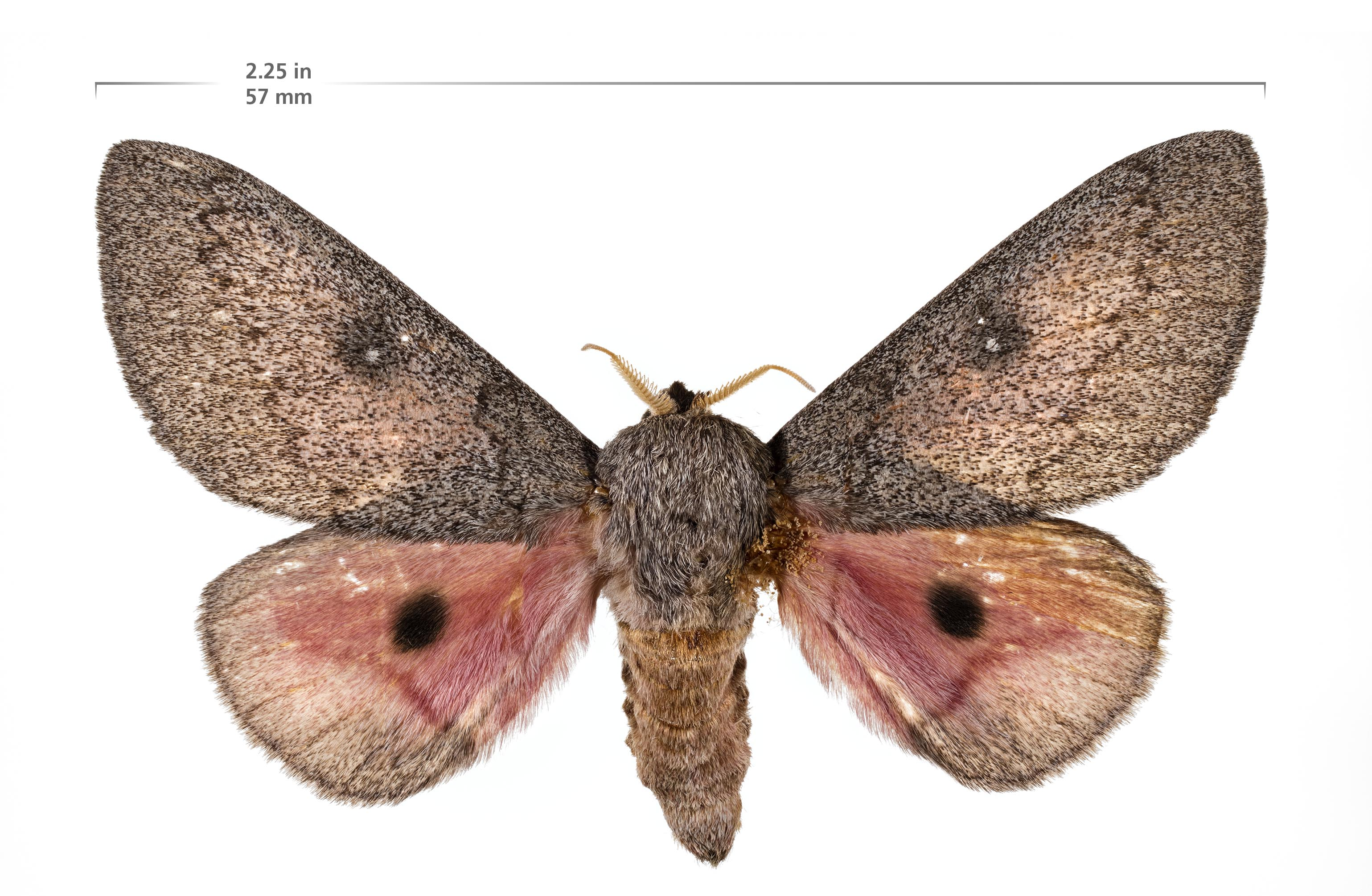
- Genus - Sphingicampa Species - heiligbrodti Common Name - Mesquite moth

Scientific classification
- Domain: Eukaryota
- Kingdom: Animalia
- Phylum: Arthropoda
- Class: Insecta
- Order: Lepidoptera
- Family: Saturniidae
- Genus: Sphingicampa
- Species: S. heiligbrodti

Binomial name
- Sphingicampa heiligbrodti Harvey, 1877

= Sphingicampa heiligbrodti =

Species of moth

Sphingicampa heiligbrodti is a species of giant silkworm moth in the family Saturniidae. It is found in Central America and North America.
