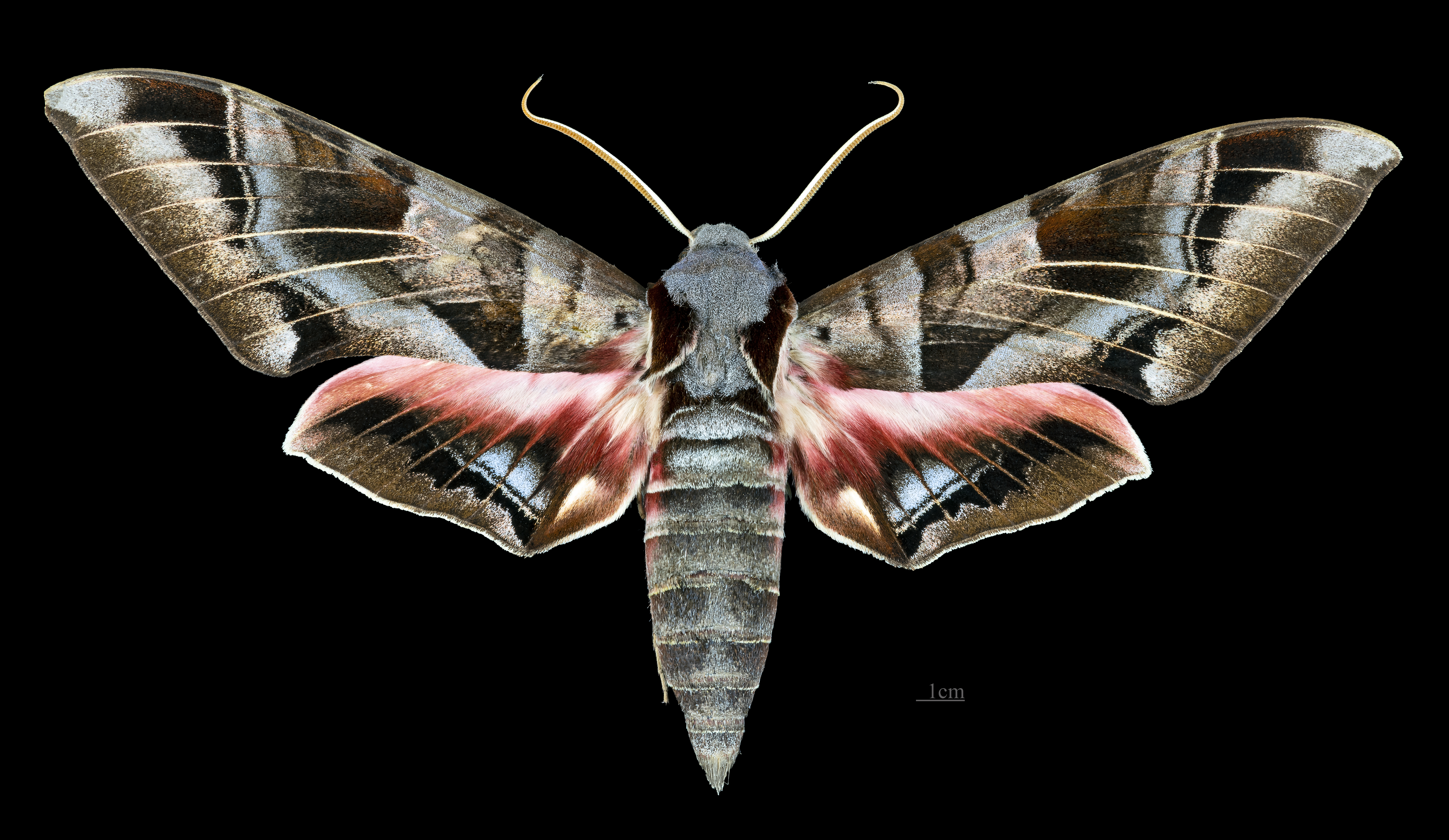
- Male dorsal view
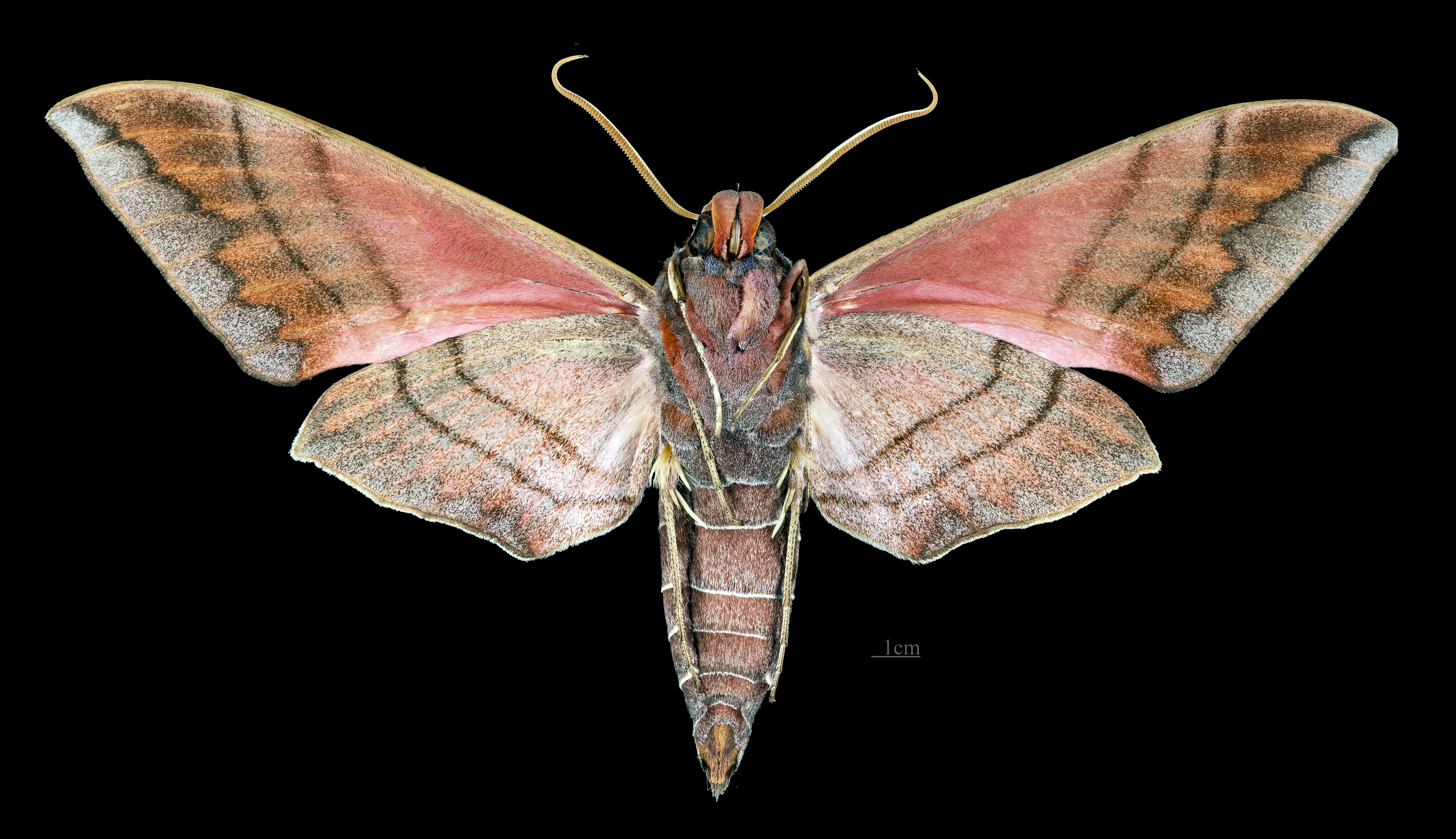
- Male ventral view

Conservation status
- Secure (NatureServe)

Scientific classification
- Kingdom: Animalia
- Phylum: Arthropoda
- Clade: Pancrustacea
- Class: Insecta
- Order: Lepidoptera
- Family: Sphingidae
- Genus: Eumorpha
- Species: E. typhon

Binomial name
- Eumorpha typhon (Klug, 1836)

Synonyms
- Sphinx typhon Klug, 1836; Philampelus typhon

= Eumorpha typhon =

Typhon sphinx

Species of moth

Eumorpha typhon, the Typhon sphinx, is a moth of the family Sphingidae. The species was first described by Johann Christoph Friedrich Klug in 1836.

== Distribution ==
It lives from Honduras north through Mexico to southern Arizona.

== Description ==
The wingspan is 57–64 mm. The upperside of the wings is deep red brown with pale brown bands. Each hindwing has a pink patch along the costal margin and a triangular white spot on the outer part of the inner margin.

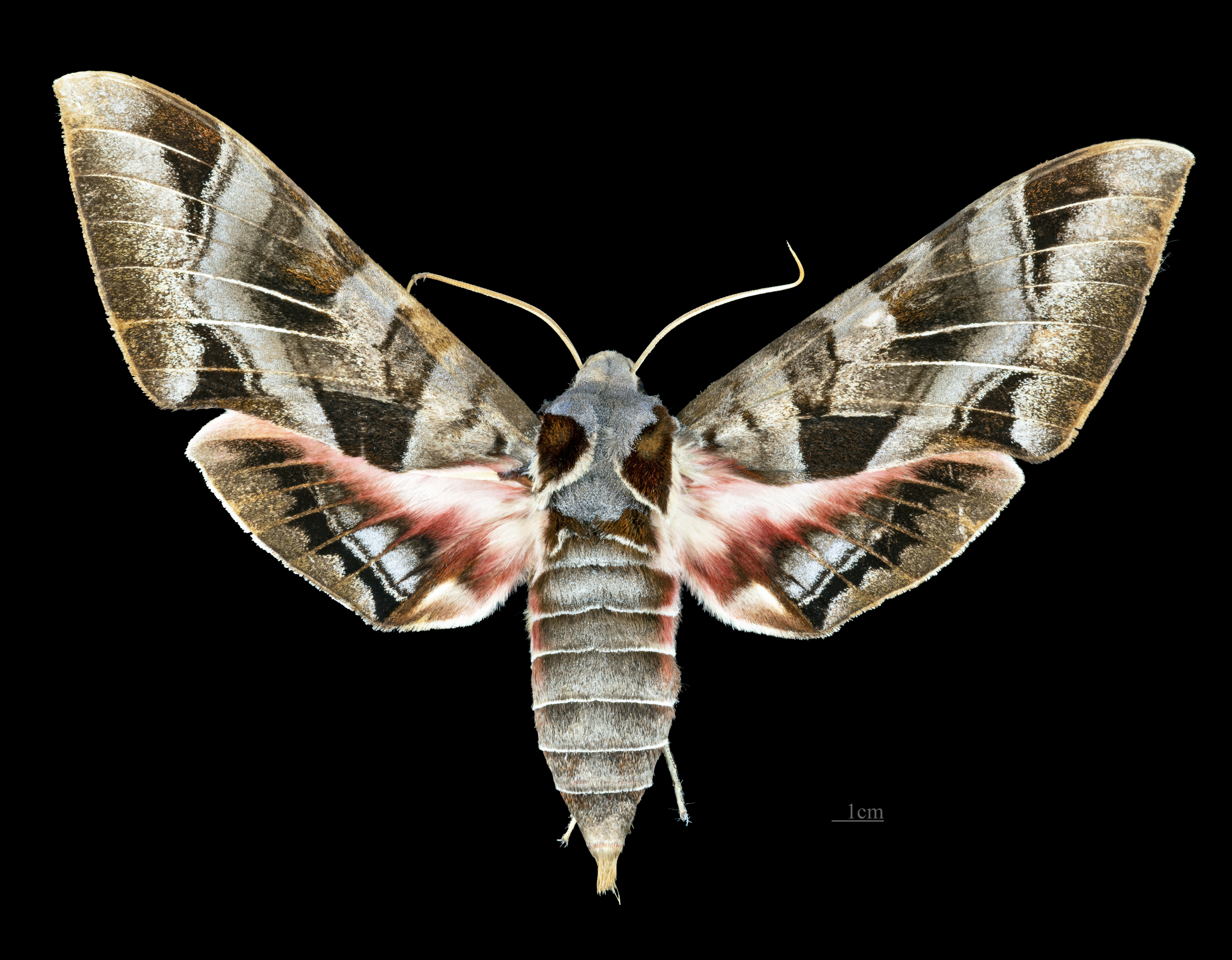
Female dorsal view

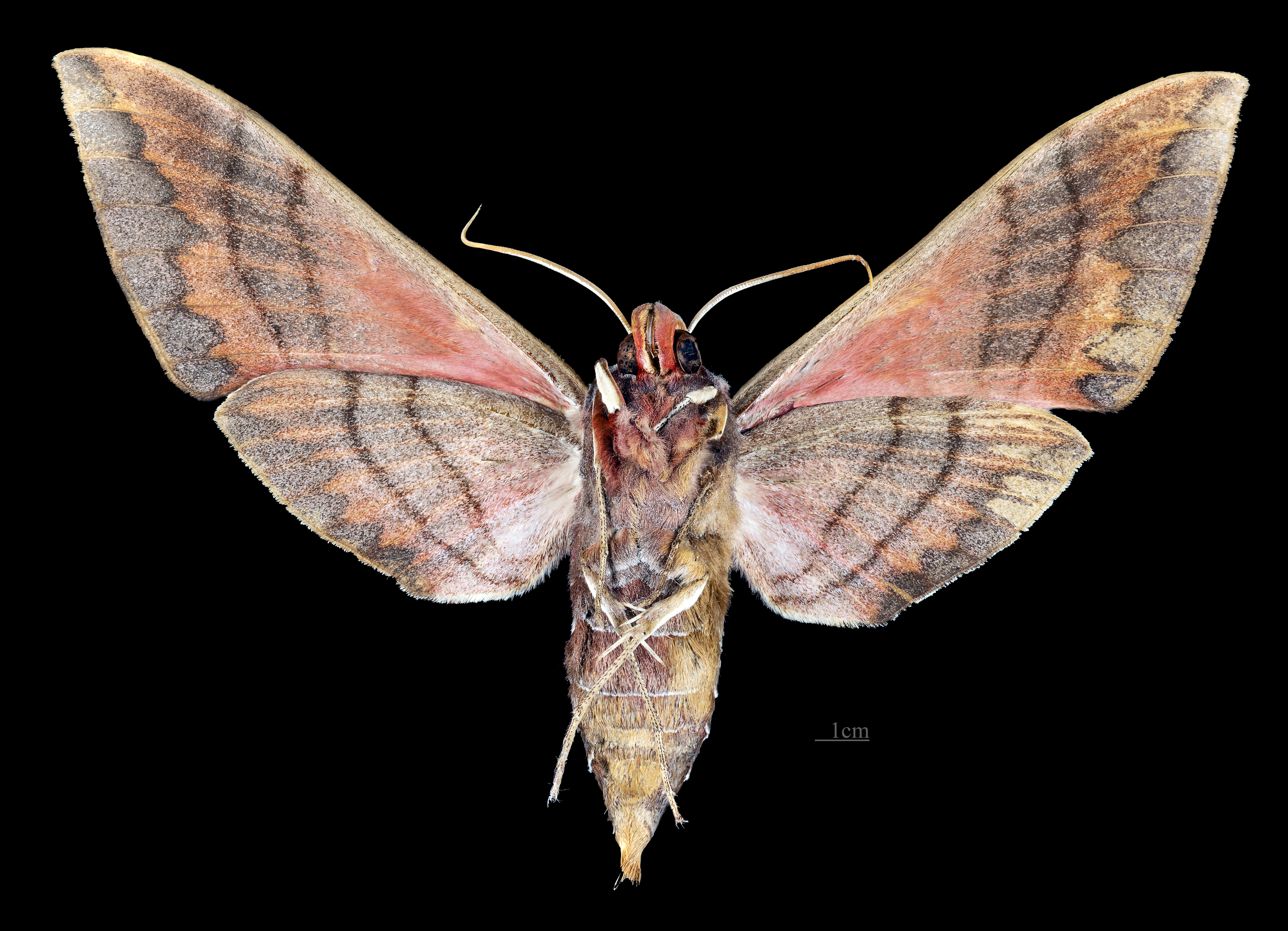
Female ventral view

== Biology ==
Adults are on wing from June to August in the northern part of the range. Adults feed on the nectar of various flowers.

The larvae feed on various grape species. Pupation takes place in shallow soil.
