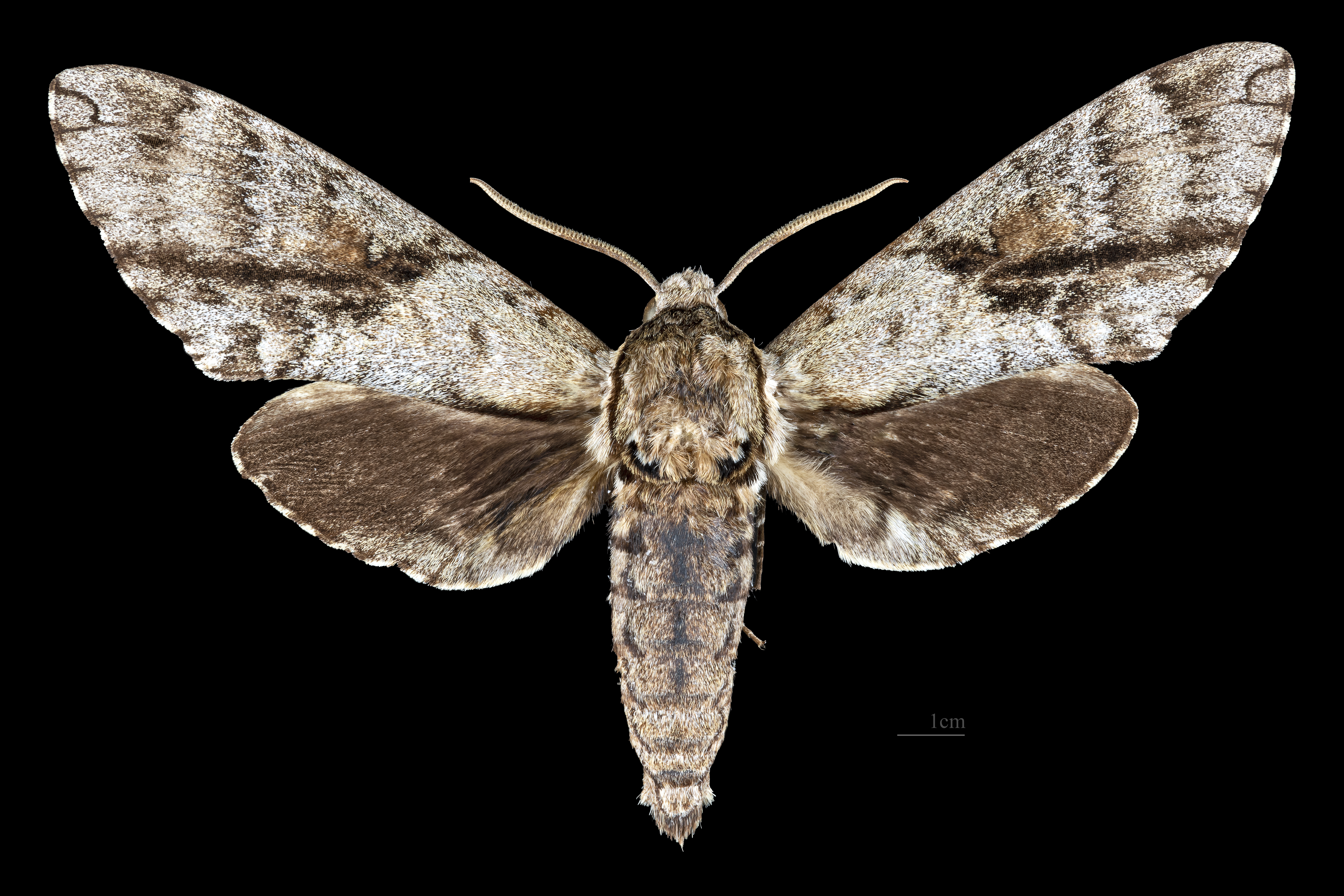
- Male dorsal
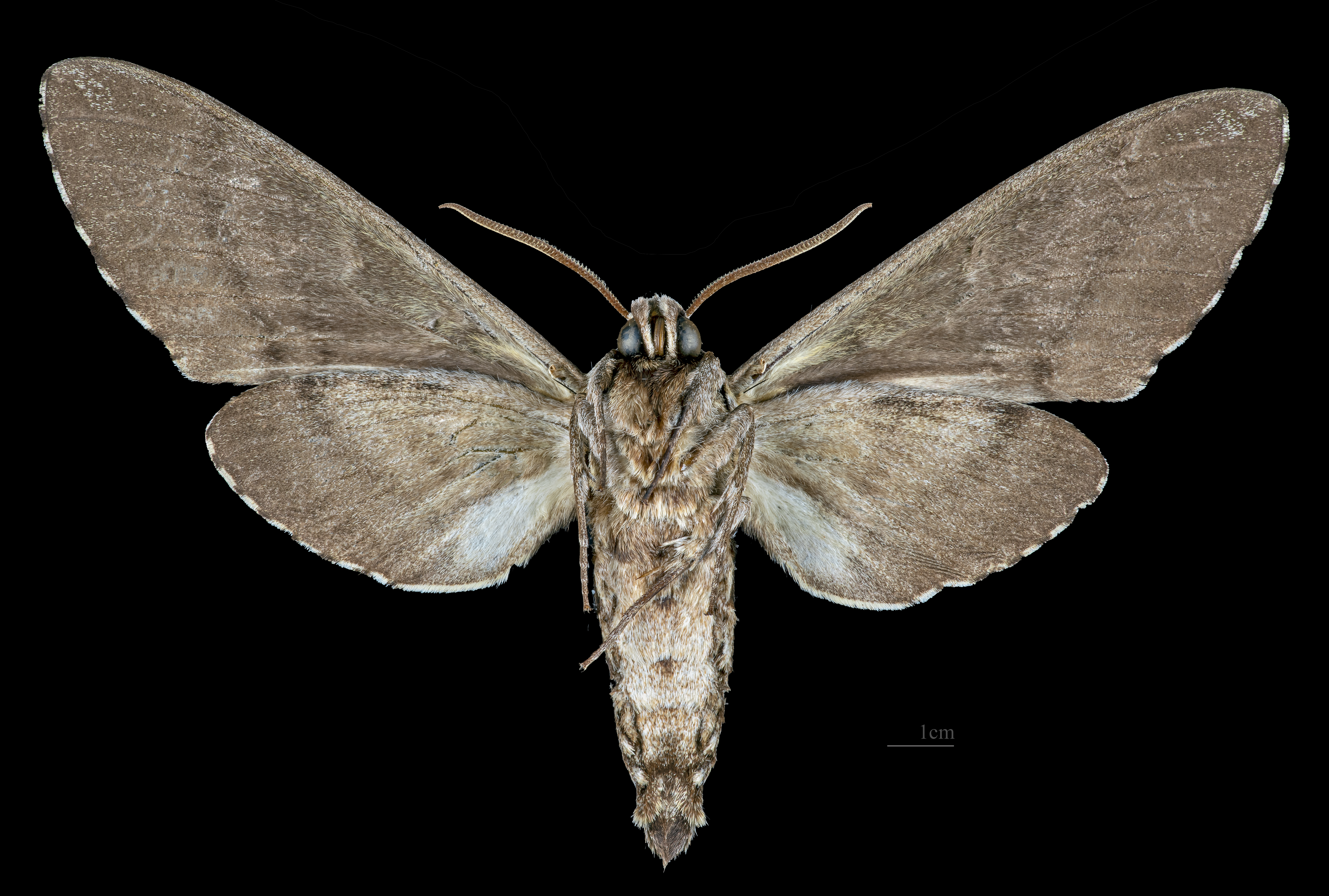
- Male ventral

Conservation status
- Vulnerable (NatureServe)

Scientific classification
- Kingdom: Animalia
- Phylum: Arthropoda
- Clade: Pancrustacea
- Class: Insecta
- Order: Lepidoptera
- Family: Sphingidae
- Genus: Manduca
- Species: M. jasminearum

Binomial name
- Manduca jasminearum (Guérin-Méneville, [1832])

Synonyms
- Sphinx jasminearum Guérin-Méneville, 1832; Macrosila rotundata Rothschild, 1894

= Manduca jasminearum =

Ash sphinx

Species of moth

Manduca jasminearum, the ash sphinx, is a member of the moth family Sphingidae. It ranges from east of the Mississippi River to the Atlantic Ocean, being common in the northeast United States.

It has a wingspan of 84–105 mm. Adults have two generations per year, flying from May to September. They feed on nectar from flowers.

The larvae primarily feed on ash species (Fraxinus), but have also been observed consuming Syringa and Ulmus species.
