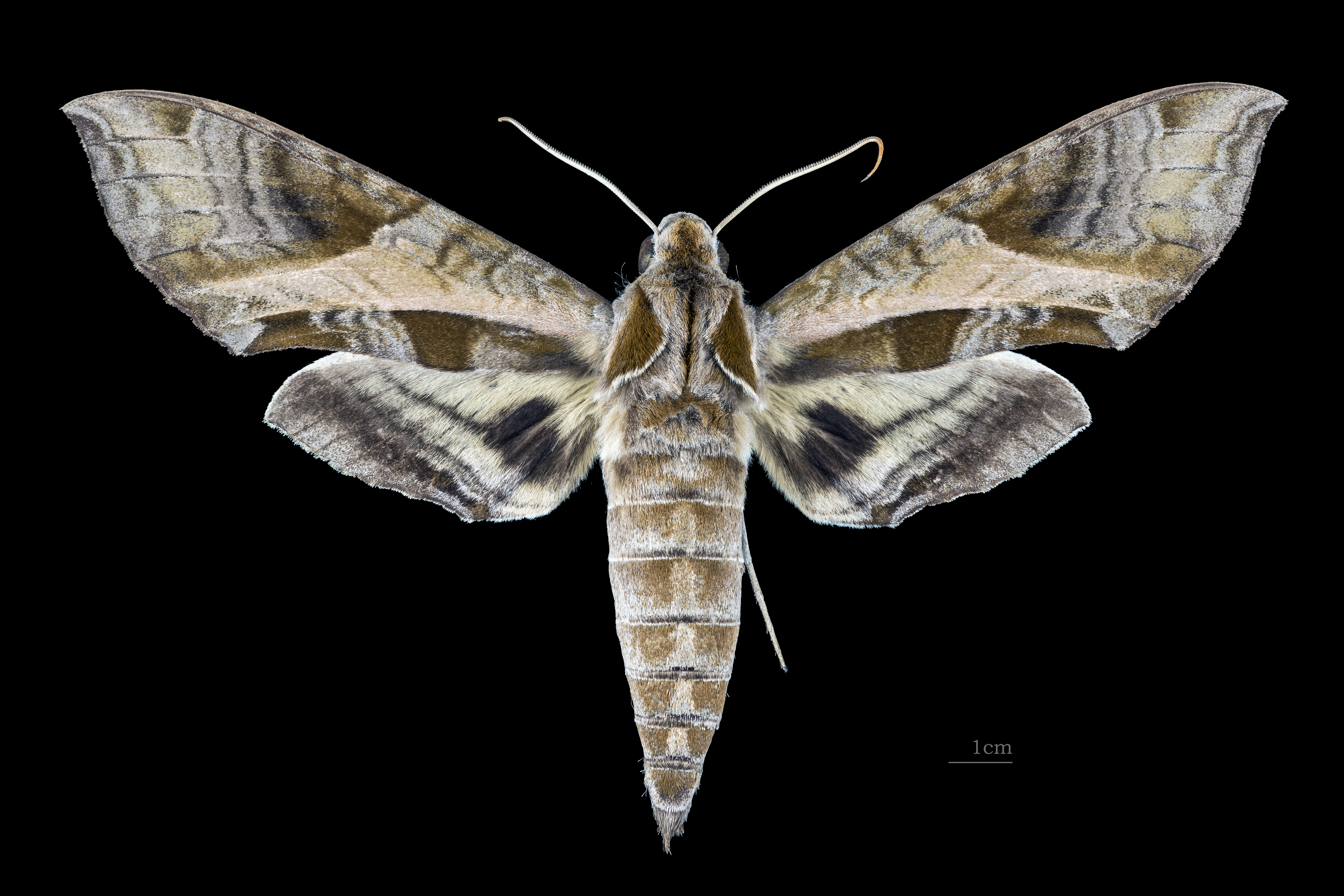
- Eumorpha megaeacus Male dorsal
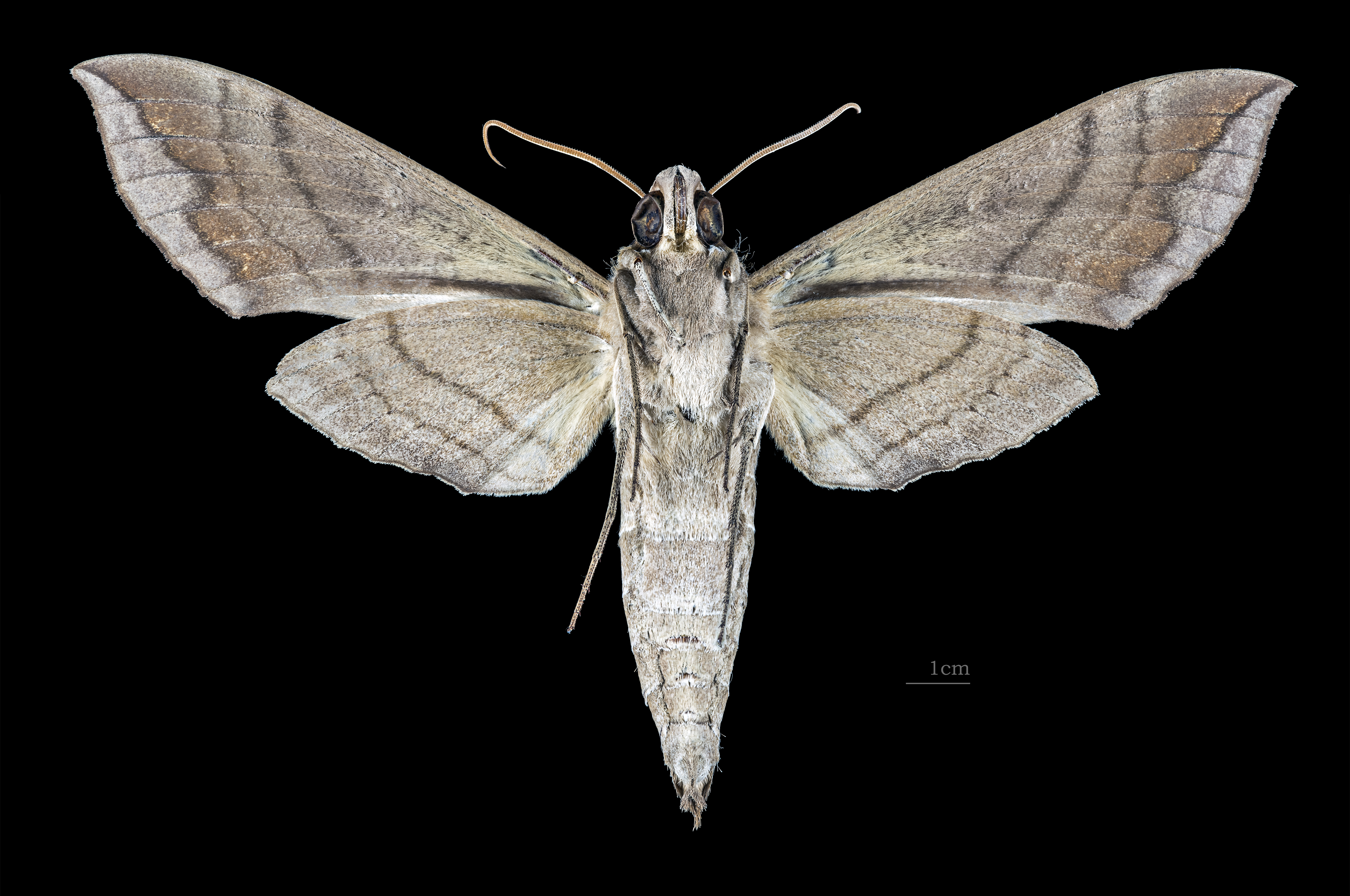
- Eumorpha megaeacus Male ventral

Scientific classification
- Domain: Eukaryota
- Kingdom: Animalia
- Phylum: Arthropoda
- Class: Insecta
- Order: Lepidoptera
- Family: Sphingidae
- Genus: Eumorpha
- Species: E. megaeacus

Binomial name
- Eumorpha megaeacus (Hubner, 1816)

Synonyms
- Daphnis megaeacus Hübner, 1819; Sphinx eacus Cramer, 1780; Eumorpha eacus

= Eumorpha megaeacus =

Species of moth

Eumorpha megaeacus is a moth of the family Sphingidae.

== Distribution ==
It is found throughout most of Central America and South America, from Suriname, Venezuela, French Guiana, Ecuador, southern Brazil and Bolivia to Nicaragua, Costa Rica and Mexico. Occasionally strays can be found as far north as Texas.

== Description ==
The wingspan is 105–121 mm. The upperside is dark and can be distinguished from other Eumorpha species by the presence of a conspicuous, but ill-defined, longitudinal brown band running parallel to the hind margin from the wing base on the forewing upperside.

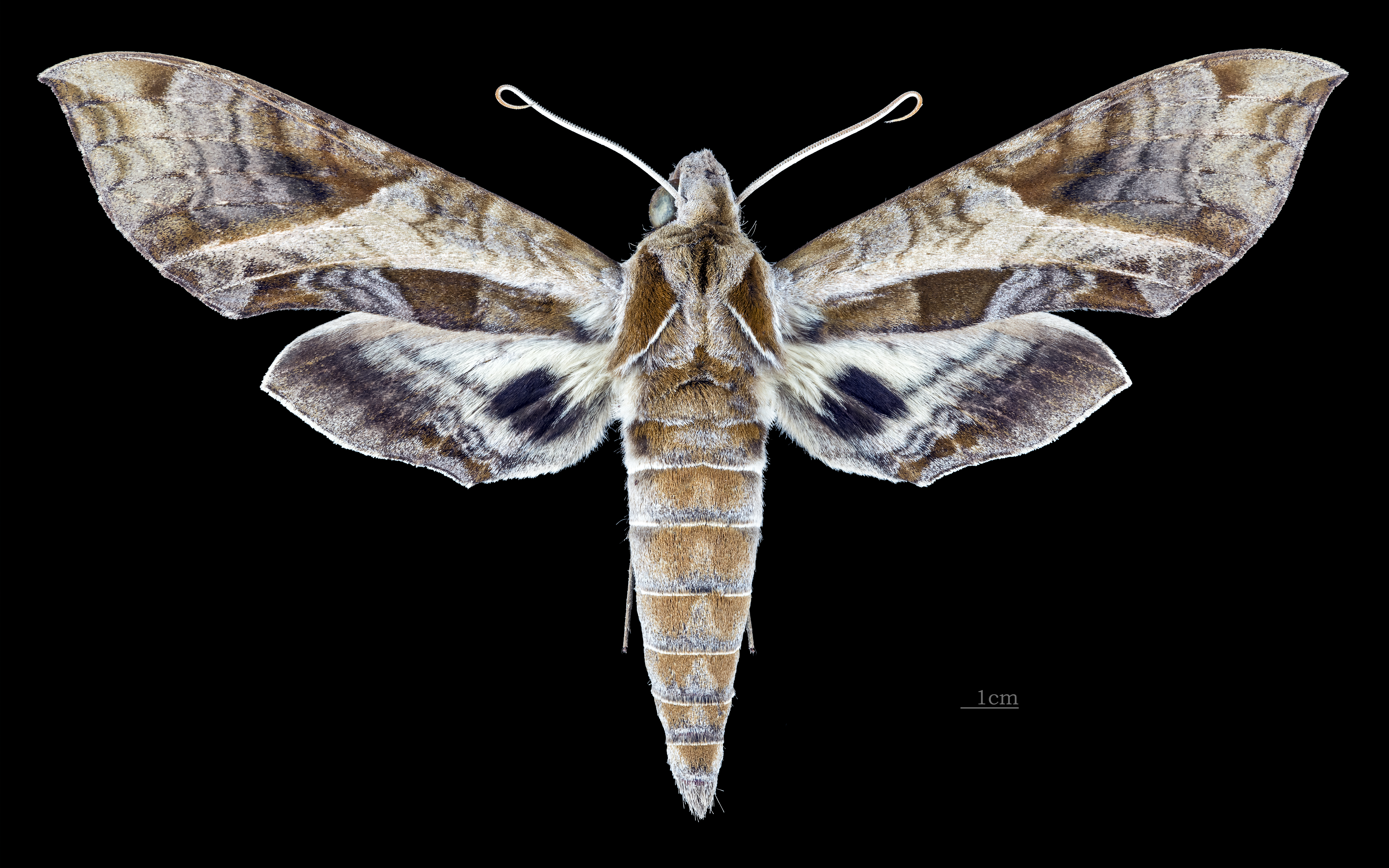
Eumorpha megaeacus Female dorsal

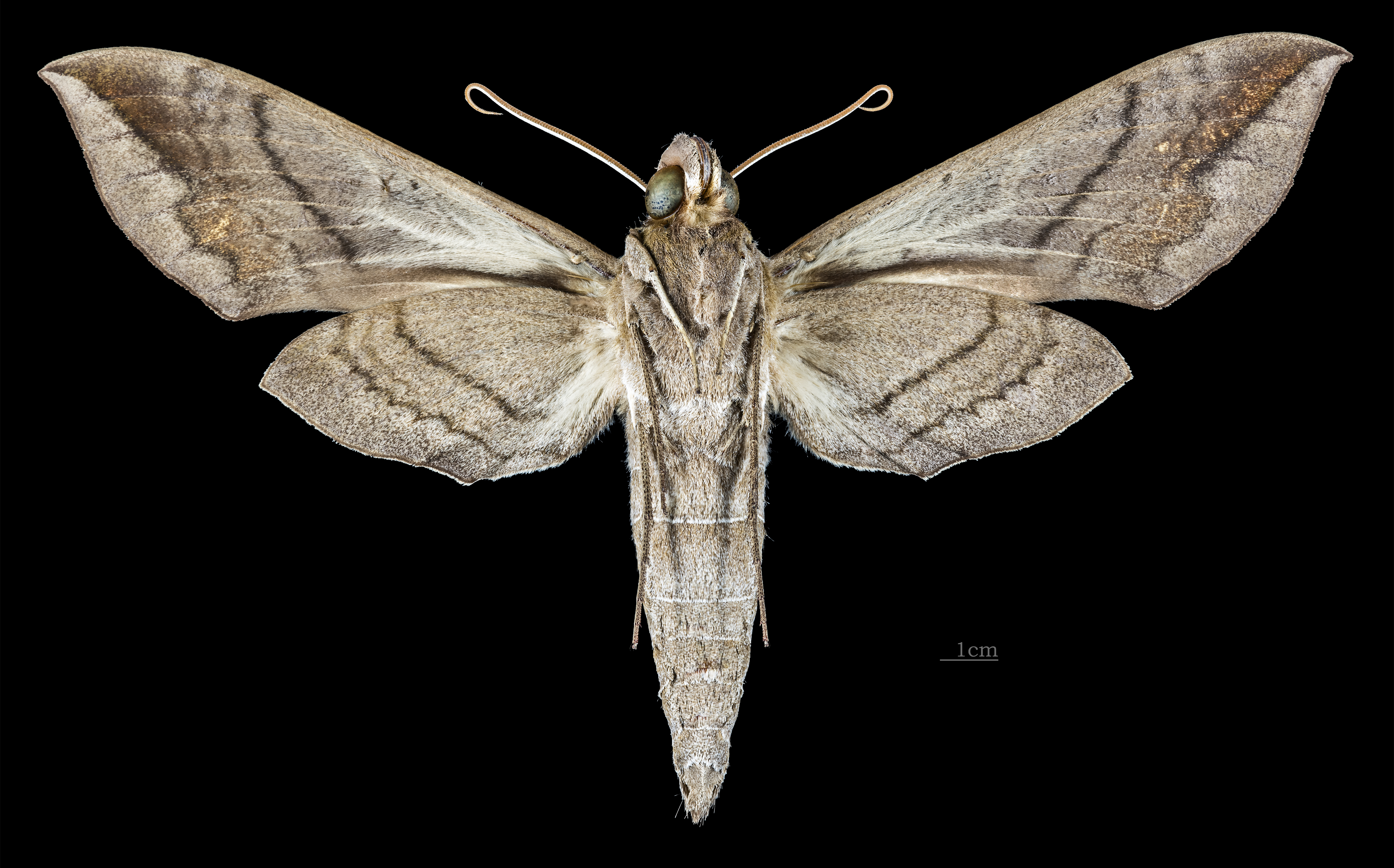
Eumorpha megaeacus Female ventral

== Biology ==
Adults are on wing from February to March, May to July and again from September to October in Costa Rica.

The larvae feed on Jussiaea and other Onagraceae species.
