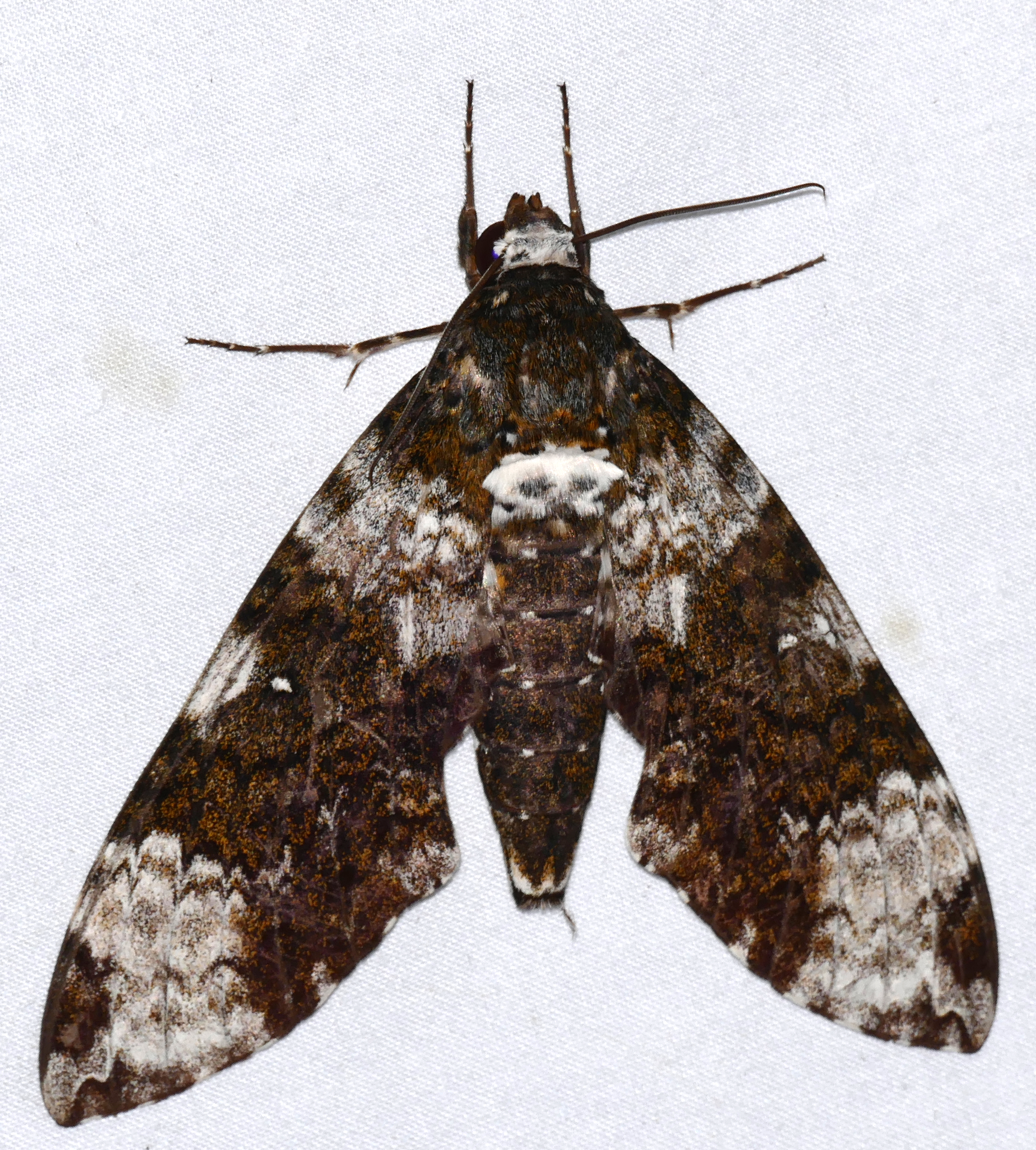

Scientific classification
- Kingdom: Animalia
- Phylum: Arthropoda
- Class: Insecta
- Order: Lepidoptera
- Family: Sphingidae
- Genus: Manduca
- Species: M. albiplaga

Binomial name
- Manduca albiplaga (Walker, 1856)

Synonyms
- Macrosila albiplaga Walker, 1856; Sphinx trojanus Schaufuss, 1870; Sphinx valida Boisduval, 1875; Protoparce albiplaga exacta Gehlen, 1928

= Manduca albiplaga =

White-plaqued sphinx

Species of moth

Manduca albiplaga, the white-plaqued sphinx, is a moth of the family Sphingidae. It was first described by Francis Walker in 1856.

== Distribution ==
Its range is from Brazil to southern Mexico, although a stray has been recorded as far north as Kansas.

== Description ==
Its wingspan is 120–180 mm.

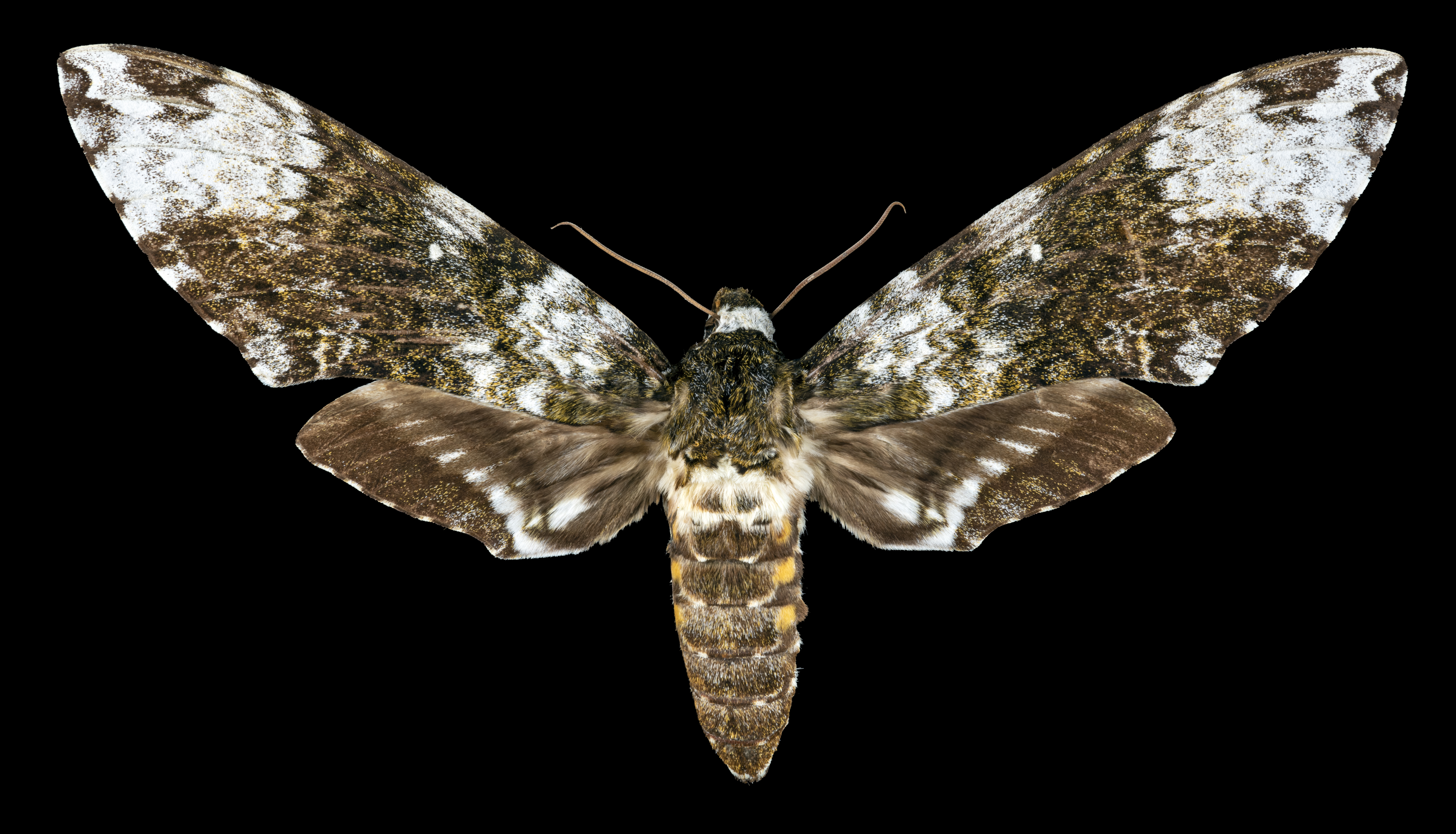
Female

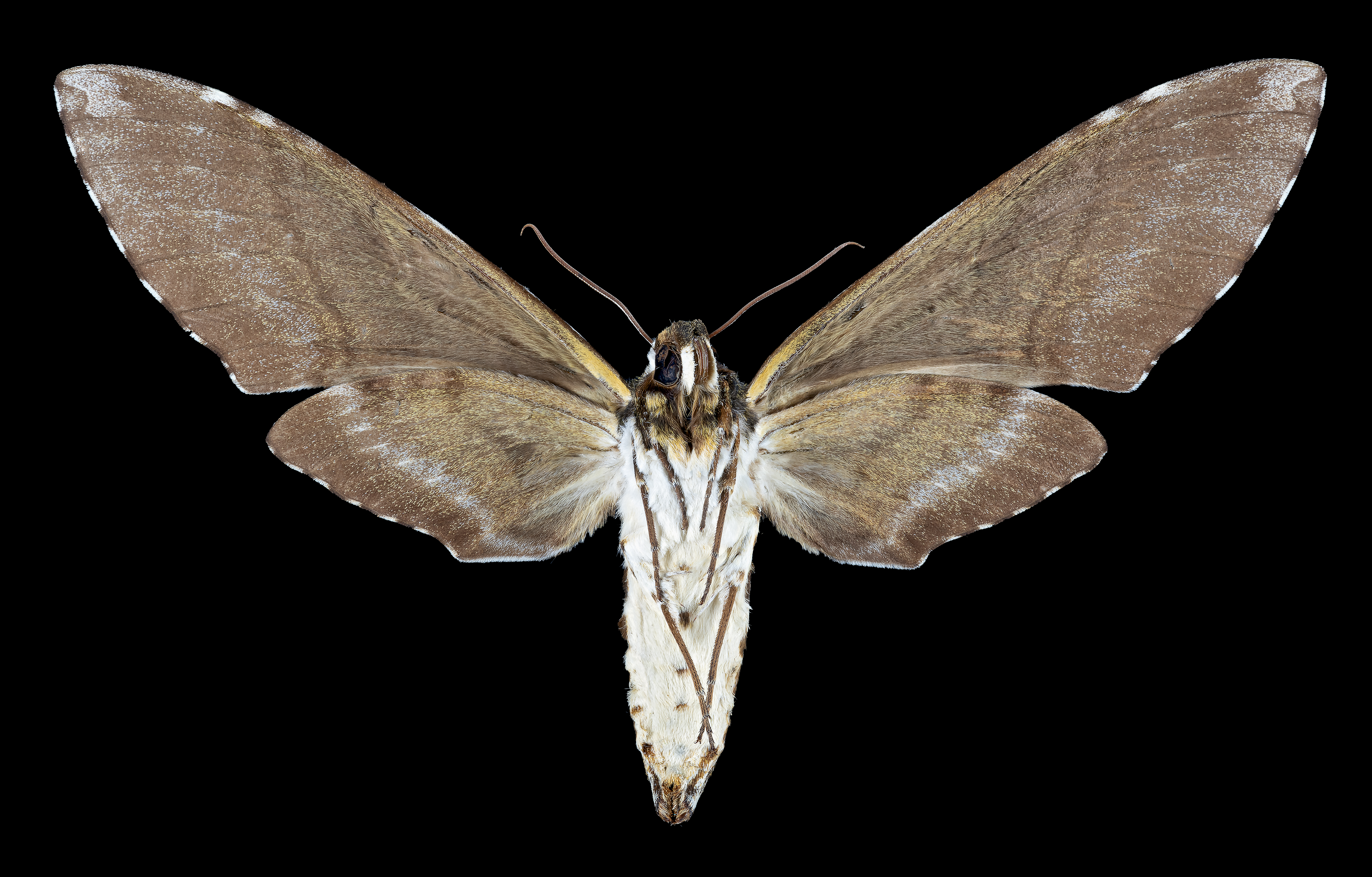
Female underside

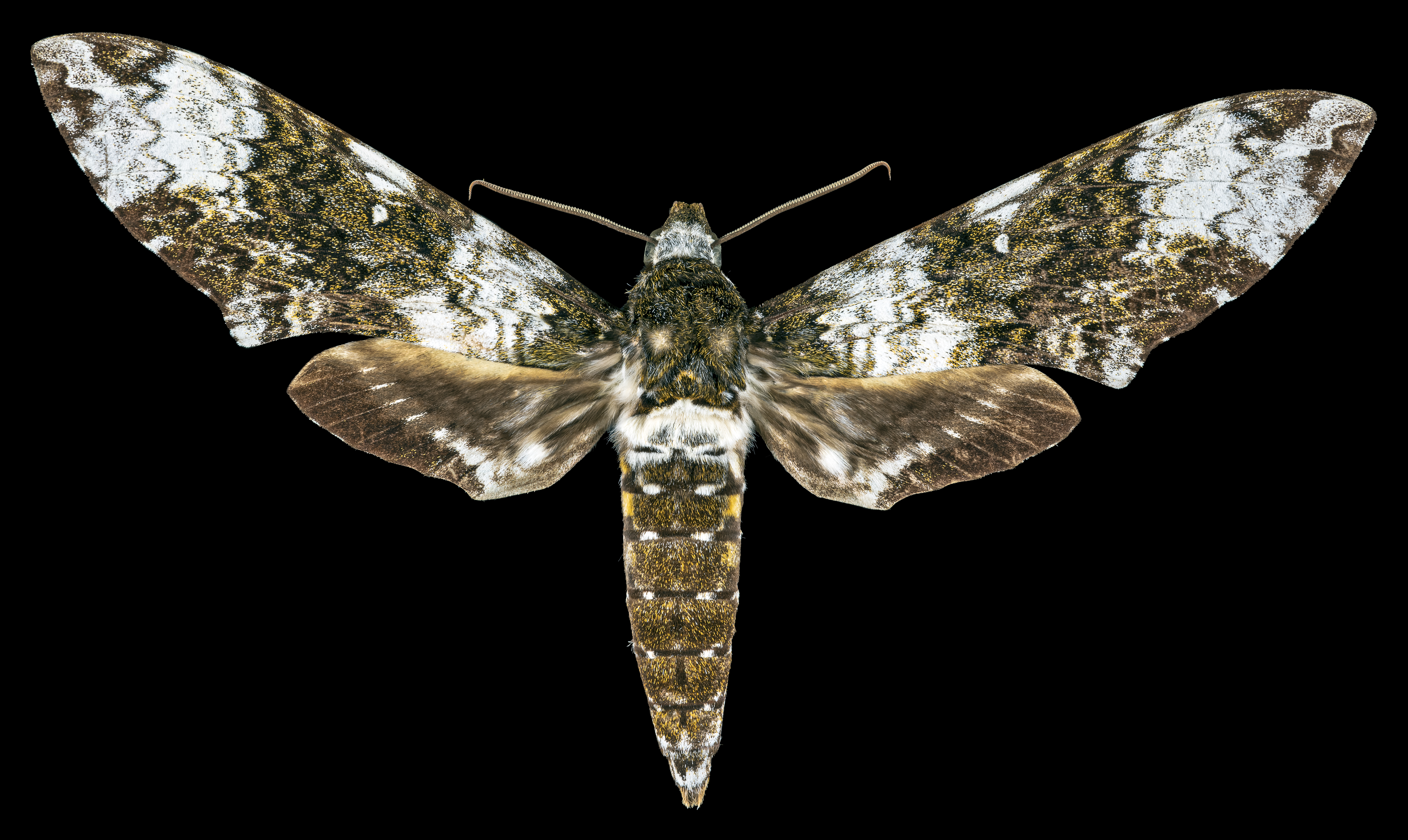
Male

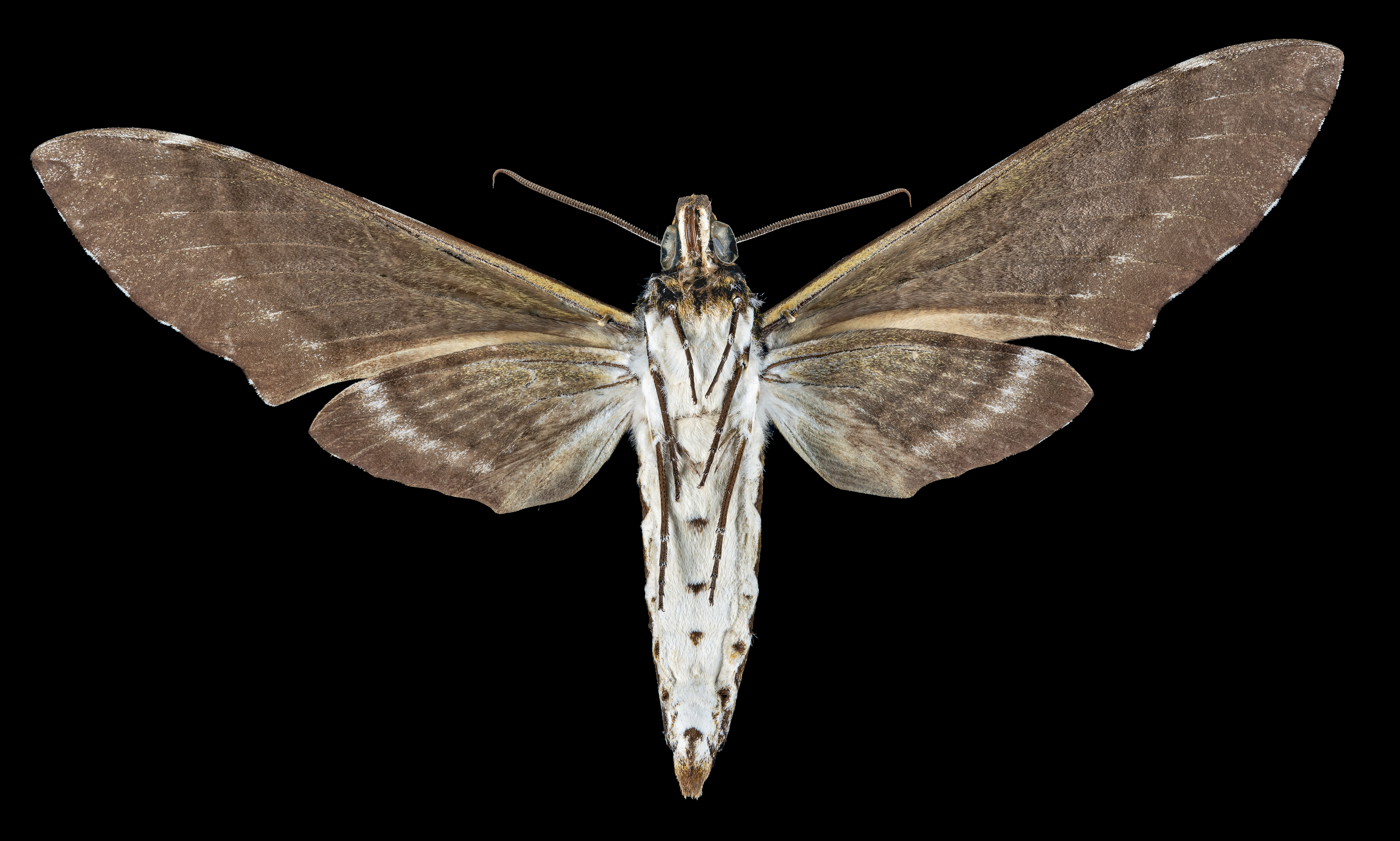
Male underside

== Biology ==
The larvae feed on plants of the family Boraginaceae and some in the family Annonaceae including Rollinia deliciosa.
