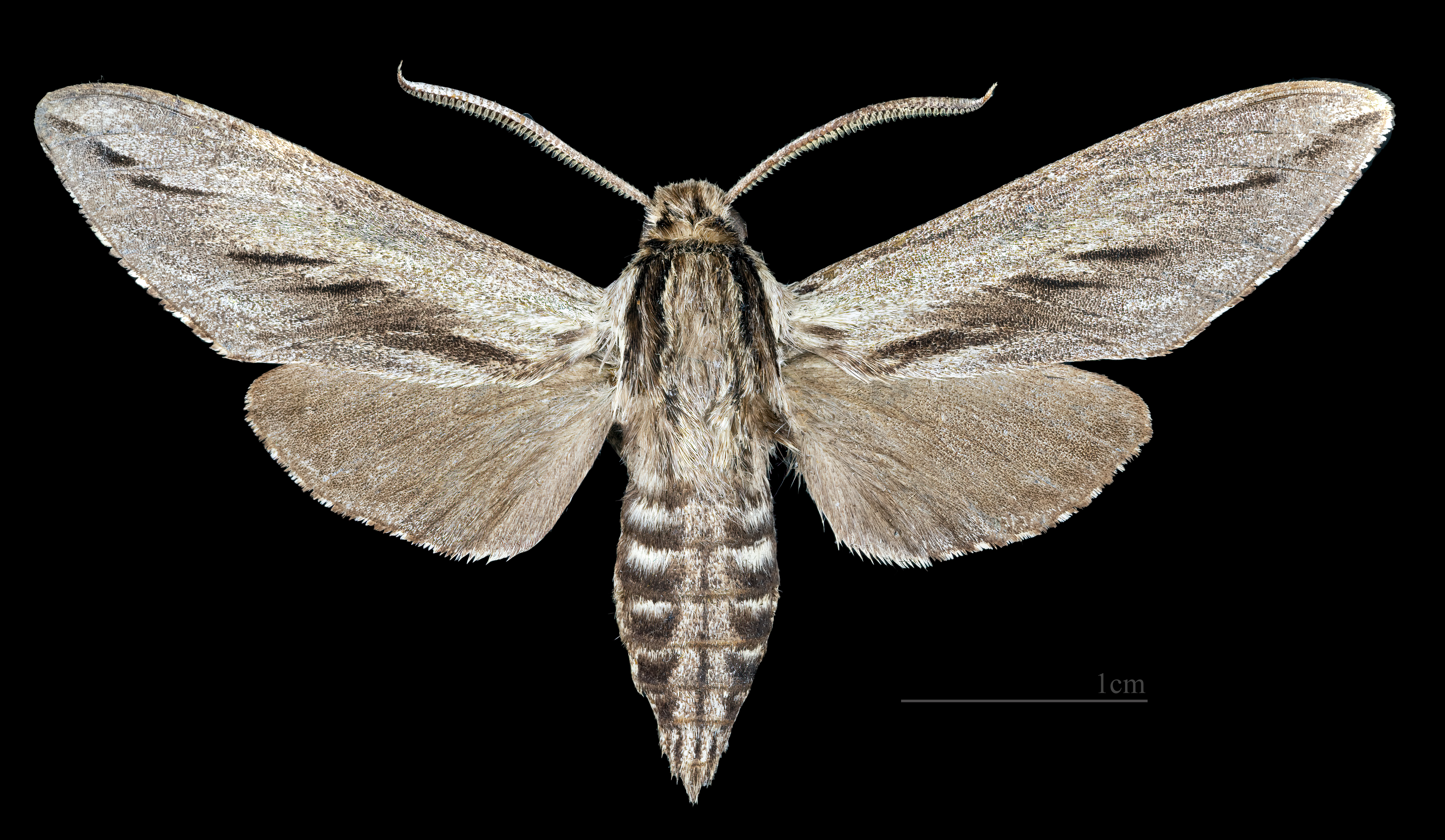

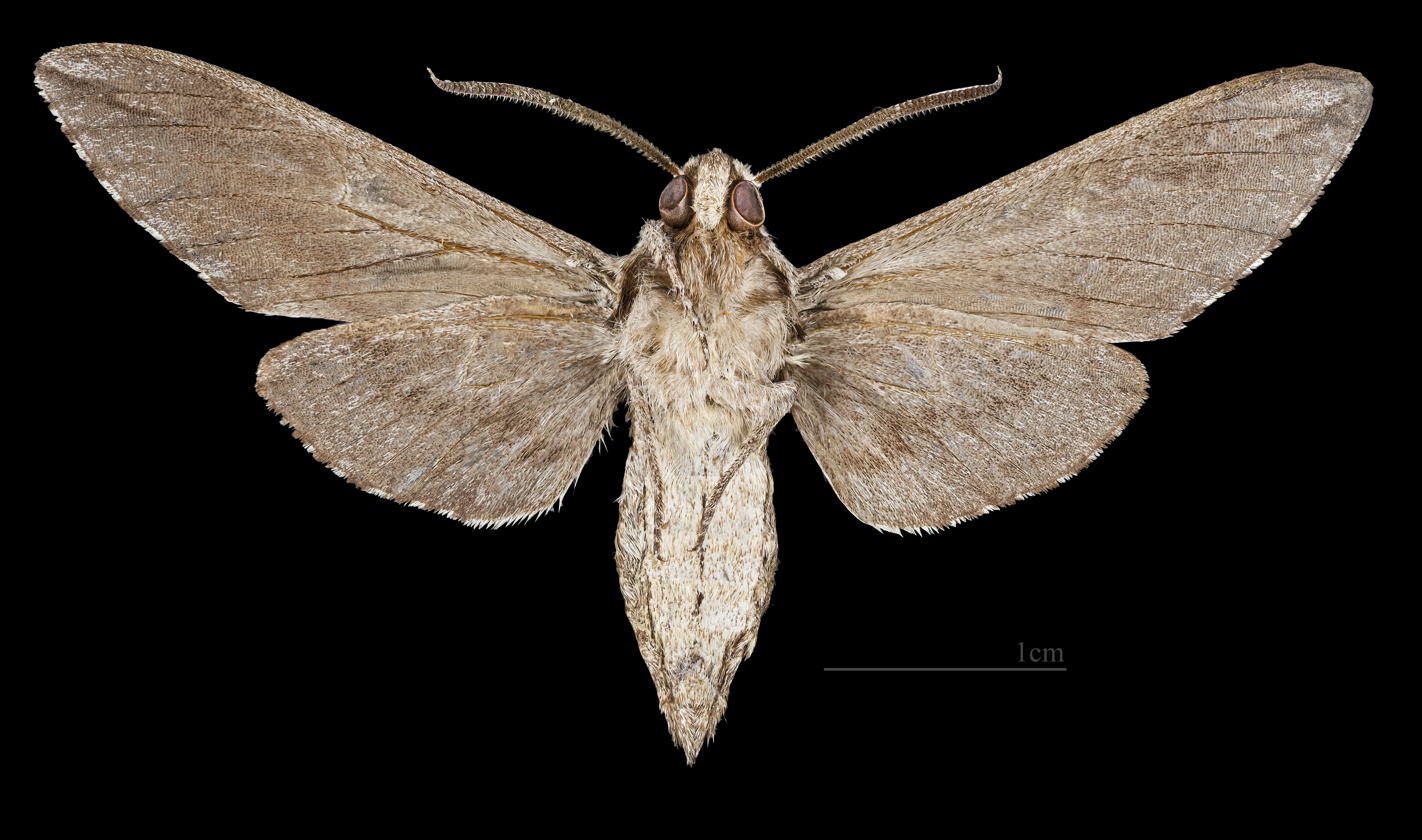

Scientific classification
- Domain: Eukaryota
- Kingdom: Animalia
- Phylum: Arthropoda
- Class: Insecta
- Order: Lepidoptera
- Family: Sphingidae
- Genus: Sphinx
- Species: S. dollii

Binomial name
- Sphinx dollii Neumoegen, 1881

Synonyms
- Sphinx coloradus Smith, 1887; Sphinx dollii australis Clark, 1922

= Sphinx dollii =

Doll's sphinx moth

Species of moth

Sphinx dollii, or Doll's sphinx moth, is a moth of the family Sphingidae. It is known from arid brushlands and desert foothills from Nevada and southern California east through Utah, Arizona, Colorado, and from New Mexico to Oklahoma and Texas.

The wingspan is 45–63 mm. There is one generation with adults on wing from June to August.

The larvae feed on Juniperus species, including Juniperus deppeana.
