= Neoplynes eudora =

Scientific classification
- Kingdom: Animalia
- Phylum: Arthropoda
- Class: Insecta
- Order: Lepidoptera
- Superfamily: Noctuoidea
- Family: Erebidae
- Subfamily: Arctiinae
- Genus: Neoplynes
- Species: N. eudora

Binomial name
- Neoplynes eudora (Dyar, 1894)

Synonyms
- Pagara eudora Dyar, 1894

Species of moth

Neoplynes eudora is a moth of the family Erebidae described by Harrison Gray Dyar Jr. in 1894. It is found in Florida, Georgia, North Carolina and Texas.

The wingspan is about 24 mm. Adults have been recorded on wing year round.
