= Cargida =

Scientific classification
- Kingdom: Animalia
- Phylum: Arthropoda
- Class: Insecta
- Order: Lepidoptera
- Superfamily: Noctuoidea
- Family: Notodontidae
- Genus: Cargida; Schaus, 1901
- Species: C. pyrrha

Binomial name
- Cargida pyrrha (H. Druce, 1898)

Synonyms
- Generic: Cardiga; Specific: Heterocampa pyrrha H. Druce, 1898; Cargida intensa Rothschild, 1917

Genus of moths

Cargida is a monotypic moth genus of the family Notodontidae erected by William Schaus in 1901. Its only species, Cargida pyrrha, was first described by Herbert Druce in 1898. It is found in Mexico.
