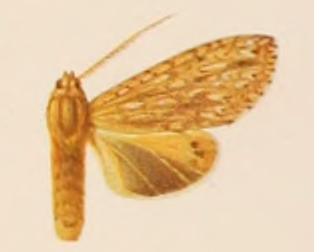
- Leucanopsis aurantiaca

Scientific classification
- Domain: Eukaryota
- Kingdom: Animalia
- Phylum: Arthropoda
- Class: Insecta
- Order: Lepidoptera
- Superfamily: Noctuoidea
- Family: Erebidae
- Subfamily: Arctiinae
- Tribe: Arctiini
- Subtribe: Phaegopterina
- Genus: Leucanopsis; Régo Barros, 1956

Synonyms
- Lepidonewtonia Régo Barros, 1956

= Leucanopsis =

Genus of moths

Leucanopsis is a genus of moths in the family Erebidae. The genus was described by Alfredo Rei do Régo Barros in 1956.

== Species ==
- Leucanopsis acuta (Hampson, 1901)
- Leucanopsis affinella (Strand, 1919)
- Leucanopsis ahysa (Schaus, 1933)
- Leucanopsis angulata (Rothschild, 1910)
- Leucanopsis apicepunctata (Schaus, 1905)
- Leucanopsis athor (Schaus, 1933)
- Leucanopsis aurantiaca (Rothschild, 1909)
- Leucanopsis aurata (E. D. Jones, 1908)
- Leucanopsis austina (Schaus, 1941)
- Leucanopsis azadina (Schaus, 1941)
- Leucanopsis bactris (Sepp, [1852])
- Leucanopsis batesi (Rothschild, 1909)
- Leucanopsis biedala (Schaus, 1941)
- Leucanopsis bipartita (Dognin, 1912)
- Leucanopsis boliviana (Dognin, 1922)
- Leucanopsis calvona (Schaus, 1941)
- Leucanopsis cedon (Druce, 1897)
- Leucanopsis chesteria (Schaus, 1941)
- Leucanopsis cirphis (Schaus, 1911)
- Leucanopsis cirphoides (Rothschild, 1916)
- Leucanopsis cloisa (Schaus, 1941)
- Leucanopsis coniota (Hampson, 1901)
- Leucanopsis contempta (Rothschild, 1909)
- Leucanopsis cuneipuncta (Rothschild, 1909)
- Leucanopsis curta (Rothschild, 1910)
- Leucanopsis dallipa (E. D. Jones, 1908)
- Leucanopsis daltona (Schaus, 1941)
- Leucanopsis democrata (Schaus, 1920)
- Leucanopsis dinellii (Rothschild, 1909)
- Leucanopsis dissimilis (Reich, 1935)
- Leucanopsis dogniniana (Strand, 1919)
- Leucanopsis ephrem (Schaus, 1905)
- Leucanopsis falacra (Dognin, 1891)
- Leucanopsis falacroides (Rothschild, 1909)
- Leucanopsis flavorufa (Rothschild, 1910)
- Leucanopsis fuscosa (E. D. Jones, 1908)
- Leucanopsis goodgeri Toulgoët, 2003
- Leucanopsis guascana (Schaus, 1941)
- Leucanopsis hadenoides (Rothschild, 1909)
- Leucanopsis hoffmannsi (Rothschild, 1909)
- Leucanopsis huacina (Schaus, 1933)
- Leucanopsis huaco (Schaus, 1901)
- Leucanopsis infucata (Berg, 1882)
- Leucanopsis ishima (Schaus, 1941)
- Leucanopsis joasa (Schaus, 1941)
- Leucanopsis jonesi (Rothschild, 1909)
- Leucanopsis lacteogrisea (Rothschild, 1909)
- Leucanopsis leucanina (Felder & Rogenhofer, 1874)
- Leucanopsis lineata (Schaus, 1894)
- Leucanopsis liparoides (Rothschild, 1909)
- Leucanopsis loisona (Schaus, 1941)
- Leucanopsis lomara (Schaus, 1941)
- Leucanopsis longa (Grote, 1880) – long-streaked tussock moth
- Leucanopsis louella (Schaus, 1941)
- Leucanopsis lurida (H. Edwards, 1887)
- Leucanopsis luridioides (Rothschild, 1917)
- Leucanopsis maccessoya (Schaus, 1933)
- Leucanopsis mailula (Schaus, 1927)
- Leucanopsis malodonta (Dyar, 1914)
- Leucanopsis manana (Schaus, 1941)
- Leucanopsis mancina (Schaus, 1920)
- Leucanopsis mandus (Herrich-Schäffer, [1855])
- Leucanopsis marimba (Schaus, 1933)
- Leucanopsis martona (Schaus, 1941)
- Leucanopsis misona (Schaus, 1941)
- Leucanopsis moeschleri (Rothschild, 1909)
- Leucanopsis nayapana (Schaus, 1941)
- Leucanopsis nebulosa (Rothschild, 1909)
- Leucanopsis nimbiscripta (Dyar, 1912)
- Leucanopsis nonagrioides (Rothschild, 1910)
- Leucanopsis notodontina (Rothschild, 1910)
- Leucanopsis nubilosus (Rothschild, 1909)
- Leucanopsis oblonga (Rothschild, 1909)
- Leucanopsis obvia (Dognin, 1909)
- Leucanopsis ochracea (Möschler, 1883)
- Leucanopsis orooca (Schaus, 1924)
- Leucanopsis oruba (Schaus, 1892)
- Leucanopsis oruboides (Rothschild, 1909)
- Leucanopsis perdentata (Schaus, 1901)
- Leucanopsis perdita (Schaus, 1920)
- Leucanopsis perirrorata (Reich, 1935)
- Leucanopsis pohli (Schaus, 1927)
- Leucanopsis polyodonta (Hampson, 1901)
- Leucanopsis potamia (Schaus, 1941)
- Leucanopsis pseudoconiata (Rothschild, 1909)
- Leucanopsis pseudofalacra (Rothschild, 1917)
- Leucanopsis pseudomanda (Rothschild, 1910)
- Leucanopsis pterostomoides (Rothschild, 1909)
- Leucanopsis pulverea (Schaus, 1896)
- Leucanopsis pulverulenta (Dognin, 1923)
- Leucanopsis quadrata (Rothschild, 1910)
- Leucanopsis quanta (Schaus, 1896)
- Leucanopsis racema (Schaus, 1905)
- Leucanopsis rhomboidea (Sepp, 1848)
- Leucanopsis rosetta (Schaus, 1896)
- Leucanopsis rufoochracea (Rothschild, 1922)
- Leucanopsis sablona (Schaus, 1896)
- Leucanopsis setosa (Rothschild, 1909)
- Leucanopsis siegruna (Schaus, 1941)
- Leucanopsis similis (Rothschild, 1909)
- Leucanopsis soldina (Schaus, 1941)
- Leucanopsis sporina (Schaus, 1941)
- Leucanopsis squalida (Herrich-Schäffer, [1855])
- Leucanopsis sthenia (Hampson, 1901)
- Leucanopsis stipulata (Rothschild, 1909)
- Leucanopsis stipulatoides (Rothschild, 1910)
- Leucanopsis strigulosa (Walker, 1855)
- Leucanopsis stuarti (Rothschild, 1909)
- Leucanopsis suavina (Schaus, 1941)
- Leucanopsis subnebulosa (Strand, 1919)
- Leucanopsis subterranea (Rothschild, 1909)
- Leucanopsis suffusa (E. D. Jones, 1908)
- Leucanopsis tabernilla (Schaus, 1933)
- Leucanopsis tanamo (Schaus, 1904)
- Leucanopsis taperana (Schaus, 1933)
- Leucanopsis terola (Schaus, 1941)
- Leucanopsis terranea (Rothschild, 1909)
- Leucanopsis toledana (Schaus, 1941)
- Leucanopsis truncata (Rothschild, 1922)
- Leucanopsis turrialba (Schaus, 1911)
- Leucanopsis umbrina (Rothschild, 1910)
- Leucanopsis umbrosa (Hampson, 1901)
- Leucanopsis valentina (Schaus, 1924)
- Leucanopsis vangetta (Dyar, 1910)
- Leucanopsis velivolans (Dyar, 1920)
- Leucanopsis venezuelensis (Rothschild, 1909)
- Leucanopsis violascens (Reich, 1933)
- Leucanopsis zacualpana (Schaus, 1941)
- Leucanopsis zozinna (Schaus, 1933)

== Former species ==
- Leucanopsis atrata Toulgoët, 2003
- Leucanopsis alarica (Schaus, 1941)
- Leucanopsis domara (Schaus, 1941)
- Leucanopsis grota (Schaus, 1941)
- Leucanopsis lua (Dyar, 1910)
