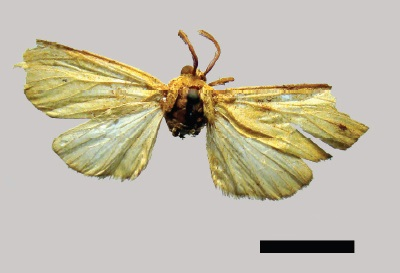

Scientific classification
- Domain: Eukaryota
- Kingdom: Animalia
- Phylum: Arthropoda
- Class: Insecta
- Order: Lepidoptera
- Superfamily: Noctuoidea
- Family: Erebidae
- Subfamily: Arctiinae
- Genus: Leucanopsis
- Species: L. infucata

Binomial name
- Leucanopsis infucata (Berg, 1882)

Synonyms
- Halisidota infucata Berg, 1882

= Leucanopsis infucata =

Species of moth

Leucanopsis infucata is a moth of the family Erebidae. It was described by Carlos Berg in 1882 and is found in Argentina.

== Taxonomy ==
It was placed as a synonym of Leucanopsis leucanina by George Hampson in 1901. Research in 2014 concluded it is a valid species.
