= Athor =

Athor can refer to several things:

- Alternative spelling of Hathor, an Egyptian goddess
- ʾAthor, the Syriac name for Assyria
- Asteroid 161 Athor
- George Athor Deng (1962 – 2011) South Sudanese General and Politician

== See also ==
- Leucanopsis athor a moth
