= Leucanopsis rhomboidea =

Scientific classification
- Domain: Eukaryota
- Kingdom: Animalia
- Phylum: Arthropoda
- Class: Insecta
- Order: Lepidoptera
- Superfamily: Noctuoidea
- Family: Erebidae
- Subfamily: Arctiinae
- Genus: Leucanopsis
- Species: L. rhomboidea

Binomial name
- Leucanopsis rhomboidea (Sepp, 1848)

Synonyms
- Bombyx rhomboidea Sepp, 1848; Halisidota citrina Walker, [1865]

Species of moth

Leucanopsis rhomboidea is a moth of the family Erebidae. It was described by Sepp in 1848. It is found in Mexico, Guatemala, Panama, Ecuador, Bolivia, Peru, Suriname and Brazil.

The larvae feed on Paspalum indicum.
