= Leucanopsis violascens =

Scientific classification
- Domain: Eukaryota
- Kingdom: Animalia
- Phylum: Arthropoda
- Class: Insecta
- Order: Lepidoptera
- Superfamily: Noctuoidea
- Family: Erebidae
- Subfamily: Arctiinae
- Genus: Leucanopsis
- Species: L. violascens

Binomial name
- Leucanopsis violascens (Reich, 1933)

Synonyms
- Halysidota violascens Reich, 1933

Species of moth

Leucanopsis violascens is a moth of the family Erebidae. It was described by Paul Reich in 1933. It is found in Argentina.
