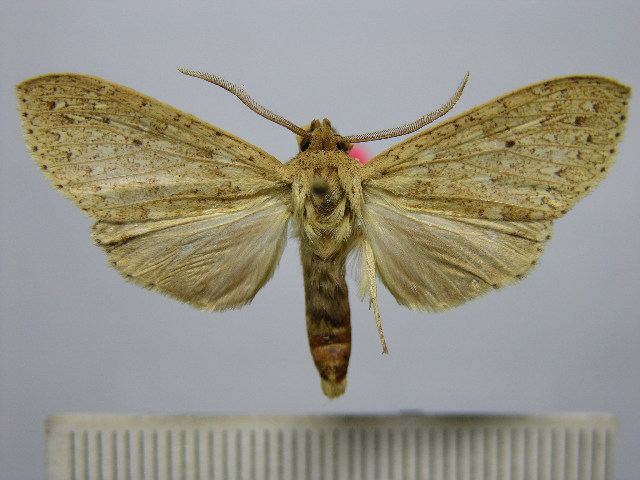

Scientific classification
- Domain: Eukaryota
- Kingdom: Animalia
- Phylum: Arthropoda
- Class: Insecta
- Order: Lepidoptera
- Superfamily: Noctuoidea
- Family: Erebidae
- Subfamily: Arctiinae
- Genus: Leucanopsis
- Species: L. taperana

Binomial name
- Leucanopsis taperana (Schaus, 1933)

Synonyms
- Halysidota taperana Schaus, 1933

= Leucanopsis taperana =

Species of moth

Leucanopsis taperana is a moth of the family Erebidae. It was described by William Schaus in 1933. It is found in Brazil and Paraguay.
