= Leucanopsis soldina =

Scientific classification
- Domain: Eukaryota
- Kingdom: Animalia
- Phylum: Arthropoda
- Class: Insecta
- Order: Lepidoptera
- Superfamily: Noctuoidea
- Family: Erebidae
- Subfamily: Arctiinae
- Genus: Leucanopsis
- Species: L. soldina

Binomial name
- Leucanopsis soldina (Schaus, 1941)

Synonyms
- Halysidota soldina Schaus, 1941

Species of moth

Leucanopsis soldina is a moth of the family Erebidae. It was described by William Schaus in 1941. It is found in Brazil.
