= Leucanopsis strigulosa =

Scientific classification
- Kingdom: Animalia
- Phylum: Arthropoda
- Class: Insecta
- Order: Lepidoptera
- Superfamily: Noctuoidea
- Family: Erebidae
- Subfamily: Arctiinae
- Genus: Leucanopsis
- Species: L. strigulosa

Binomial name
- Leucanopsis strigulosa (Walker, 1855)

Synonyms
- Halisidota strigulosa Walker, 1855

Species of moth

Leucanopsis strigulosa is a moth of the family Erebidae. It was described by Francis Walker in 1855. It is found in Pará, Brazil.
