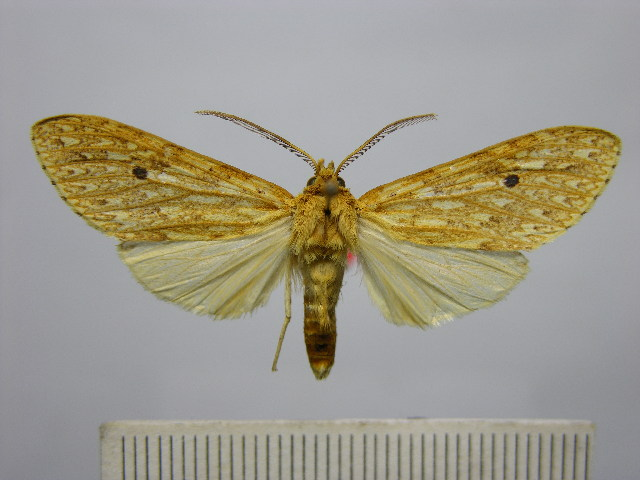

Scientific classification
- Domain: Eukaryota
- Kingdom: Animalia
- Phylum: Arthropoda
- Class: Insecta
- Order: Lepidoptera
- Superfamily: Noctuoidea
- Family: Erebidae
- Subfamily: Arctiinae
- Genus: Leucanopsis
- Species: L. boliviana

Binomial name
- Leucanopsis boliviana (Dognin, 1922)

Synonyms
- Halysidota boliviana Dognin, 1922

= Leucanopsis boliviana =

Species of moth

Leucanopsis boliviana is a moth of the family Erebidae. It was described by Paul Dognin in 1922. It is found in Bolivia, Peru and Ecuador.
