= Leucanopsis nimbiscripta =

Scientific classification
- Kingdom: Animalia
- Phylum: Arthropoda
- Class: Insecta
- Order: Lepidoptera
- Superfamily: Noctuoidea
- Family: Erebidae
- Subfamily: Arctiinae
- Genus: Leucanopsis
- Species: L. nimbiscripta

Binomial name
- Leucanopsis nimbiscripta (Dyar, 1912)

Synonyms
- Halisidota nimbiscripta Dyar, 1912

Species of moth

Leucanopsis nimbiscripta is a moth of the subfamily Arctiinae. It was described by Harrison Gray Dyar Jr. in 1912. It is found in Mexico.
