= Leucanopsis subnebulosa =

Scientific classification
- Domain: Eukaryota
- Kingdom: Animalia
- Phylum: Arthropoda
- Class: Insecta
- Order: Lepidoptera
- Superfamily: Noctuoidea
- Family: Erebidae
- Subfamily: Arctiinae
- Genus: Leucanopsis
- Species: L. subnebulosa

Binomial name
- Leucanopsis subnebulosa (Strand, 1919)

Synonyms
- Halysidota subnebulosa Strand, 1919; Halisidota nebulosa Rothschild, 1910 (preocc. Rothschild, 1909); Halysidota epinephele Hampson, 1920

Species of moth

Leucanopsis subnebulosa is a moth of the family Erebidae. It was described by Embrik Strand in 1919. It is found in Brazil.
