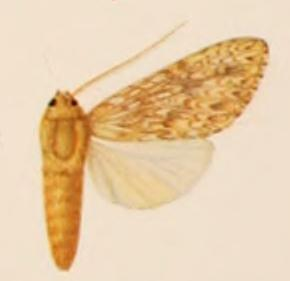

Scientific classification
- Domain: Eukaryota
- Kingdom: Animalia
- Phylum: Arthropoda
- Class: Insecta
- Order: Lepidoptera
- Superfamily: Noctuoidea
- Family: Erebidae
- Subfamily: Arctiinae
- Genus: Leucanopsis
- Species: L. nebulosa

Binomial name
- Leucanopsis nebulosa (Rothschild, 1909)

Synonyms
- Halysidota nebulosa Rothschild, 1909

= Leucanopsis nebulosa =

Species of moth

Leucanopsis nebulosa is a moth of the subfamily Arctiinae first described by Rothschild in 1909. It is found in Brazil, Peru and Ecuador.
