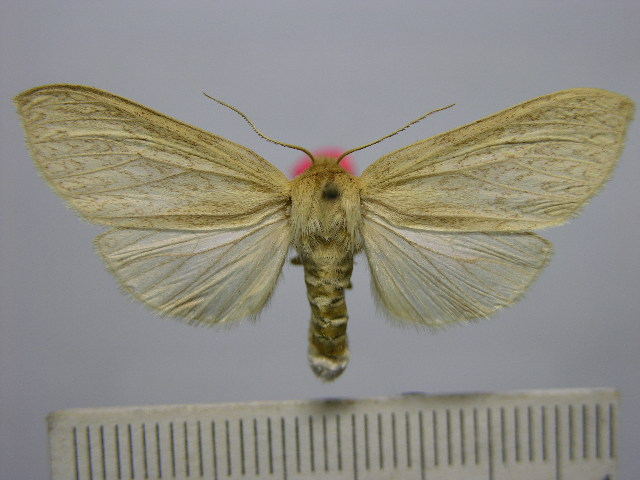

Scientific classification
- Domain: Eukaryota
- Kingdom: Animalia
- Phylum: Arthropoda
- Class: Insecta
- Order: Lepidoptera
- Superfamily: Noctuoidea
- Family: Erebidae
- Subfamily: Arctiinae
- Genus: Leucanopsis
- Species: L. perdentata

Binomial name
- Leucanopsis perdentata (Schaus, 1901)

Synonyms
- Halisidota perdentata Schaus, 1901

= Leucanopsis perdentata =

Species of moth

Leucanopsis perdentata is a moth of the family Erebidae. It was described by William Schaus in 1901. It is found in Guatemala, Mexico. and the US state of Arizona.

The wingspan is about 35 mm.
