= Hypocrisias berthula =

Scientific classification
- Kingdom: Animalia
- Phylum: Arthropoda
- Class: Insecta
- Order: Lepidoptera
- Superfamily: Noctuoidea
- Family: Erebidae
- Subfamily: Arctiinae
- Genus: Hypocrisias
- Species: H. berthula

Binomial name
- Hypocrisias berthula Dyar, 1912

Species of moth

Hypocrisias berthula is a moth of the subfamily Arctiinae. It was described by Harrison Gray Dyar Jr. in 1912. It is found in Mexico.
