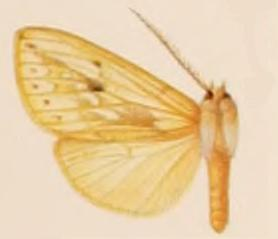

Scientific classification
- Domain: Eukaryota
- Kingdom: Animalia
- Phylum: Arthropoda
- Class: Insecta
- Order: Lepidoptera
- Superfamily: Noctuoidea
- Family: Erebidae
- Subfamily: Arctiinae
- Genus: Leucanopsis
- Species: L. pseudoconiata

Binomial name
- Leucanopsis pseudoconiata (Rothschild, 1909)

Synonyms
- Halysidota pseudoconiata Rothschild, 1909

= Leucanopsis pseudoconiata =

Species of moth

Leucanopsis pseudoconiata is a moth of the family Erebidae first described by Walter Rothschild in 1909. It is found in Peru.
