= Leucanopsis mailula =

Scientific classification
- Domain: Eukaryota
- Kingdom: Animalia
- Phylum: Arthropoda
- Class: Insecta
- Order: Lepidoptera
- Superfamily: Noctuoidea
- Family: Erebidae
- Subfamily: Arctiinae
- Genus: Leucanopsis
- Species: L. mailula

Binomial name
- Leucanopsis mailula (Schaus, 1927)

Synonyms
- Halysidota mailula Schaus, 1927

Species of moth

Leucanopsis mailula is a moth of the subfamily Arctiinae. It was described by Schaus in 1927. It is found in Argentina.
