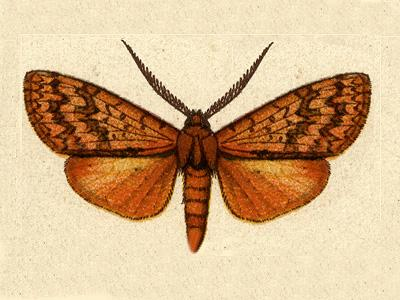

Scientific classification
- Domain: Eukaryota
- Kingdom: Animalia
- Phylum: Arthropoda
- Class: Insecta
- Order: Lepidoptera
- Superfamily: Noctuoidea
- Family: Erebidae
- Subfamily: Arctiinae
- Genus: Leucanopsis
- Species: L. moeschleri

Binomial name
- Leucanopsis moeschleri (Rothschild, 1909)

Synonyms
- Halysidota moeschleri Rothschild, 1909

= Leucanopsis moeschleri =

Species of moth

Leucanopsis moeschleri is a moth of the subfamily Arctiinae, first described by Walter Rothschild in 1909. It is native to Jamaica. It is a very rare immigrant or accidental import in Great Britain. A single specimen was recorded near Cheltenham, Gloucestershire, on 19 July 1961.

The wingspan is 48–55 mm.

The larvae feed on various broad-leaved trees. The species name honours Heinrich Benno Möschler.
