= Leucanopsis bipartita =

Scientific classification
- Domain: Eukaryota
- Kingdom: Animalia
- Phylum: Arthropoda
- Class: Insecta
- Order: Lepidoptera
- Superfamily: Noctuoidea
- Family: Erebidae
- Subfamily: Arctiinae
- Genus: Leucanopsis
- Species: L. bipartita

Binomial name
- Leucanopsis bipartita (Dognin, 1912)

Synonyms
- Halysidota bipartita Dognin, 1912

Species of moth

Leucanopsis bipartita is a moth of the family Erebidae. It was described by Paul Dognin in 1912. It is found in Colombia.
