= Leucanopsis venezuelensis =

Scientific classification
- Domain: Eukaryota
- Kingdom: Animalia
- Phylum: Arthropoda
- Class: Insecta
- Order: Lepidoptera
- Superfamily: Noctuoidea
- Family: Erebidae
- Subfamily: Arctiinae
- Genus: Leucanopsis
- Species: L. venezuelensis

Binomial name
- Leucanopsis venezuelensis (Rothschild, 1909)

Synonyms
- Halisidota venezuelensis Rothschild, 1909

Species of moth

Leucanopsis venezuelensis is a moth of the family Erebidae. It was described by Walter Rothschild in 1909. It is found in Venezuela.
