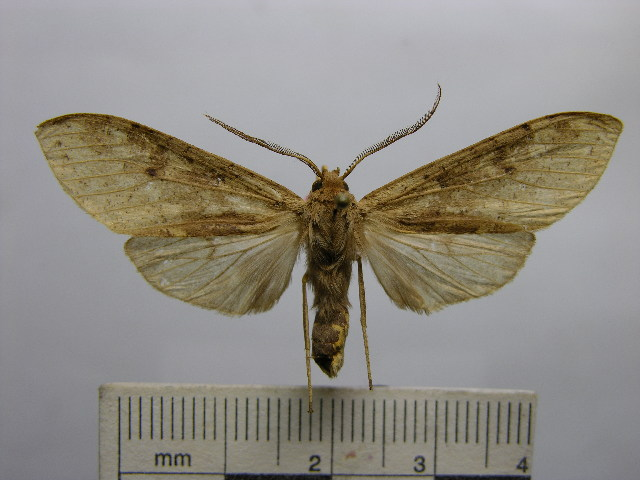

Scientific classification
- Kingdom: Animalia
- Phylum: Arthropoda
- Class: Insecta
- Order: Lepidoptera
- Superfamily: Noctuoidea
- Family: Erebidae
- Subfamily: Arctiinae
- Genus: Leucanopsis
- Species: L. sthenia

Binomial name
- Leucanopsis sthenia (Hampson, 1901)

Synonyms
- Halisidota sthenia Hampson, 1901

= Leucanopsis sthenia =

Species of moth

Leucanopsis sthenia is a moth of the family Erebidae. It was described by George Hampson in 1901. It is found in Bolivia, Peru and Venezuela.
