= Leucanopsis huaco =

Scientific classification
- Domain: Eukaryota
- Kingdom: Animalia
- Phylum: Arthropoda
- Class: Insecta
- Order: Lepidoptera
- Superfamily: Noctuoidea
- Family: Erebidae
- Subfamily: Arctiinae
- Genus: Leucanopsis
- Species: L. huaco

Binomial name
- Leucanopsis huaco (Schaus, 1901)

Synonyms
- Halisidota huaco Schaus, 1901

Species of moth

Leucanopsis huaco is a moth of the family Erebidae. It was described by William Schaus in 1901. It is found in Brazil.
