= Leucanopsis coniota =

Scientific classification
- Kingdom: Animalia
- Phylum: Arthropoda
- Class: Insecta
- Order: Lepidoptera
- Superfamily: Noctuoidea
- Family: Erebidae
- Subfamily: Arctiinae
- Genus: Leucanopsis
- Species: L. coniota

Binomial name
- Leucanopsis coniota (Hampson, 1901)

Synonyms
- Halisidota coniota Hampson, 1901

Species of moth

Leucanopsis coniota is a moth of the family Erebidae. It was described by George Hampson in 1901. It is found in Ecuador, Bolivia, Suriname and Brazil.
