= Leucanopsis affinella =

Scientific classification
- Domain: Eukaryota
- Kingdom: Animalia
- Phylum: Arthropoda
- Class: Insecta
- Order: Lepidoptera
- Superfamily: Noctuoidea
- Family: Erebidae
- Subfamily: Arctiinae
- Genus: Leucanopsis
- Species: L. affinella

Binomial name
- Leucanopsis affinella (Strand, 1919)

Synonyms
- Halysidota affinella Strand, 1919; Halisidota affinis Rothschild, 1909 (preocc. Rothchild, 1909); Halisidota syggenes Hampson, 1920

Species of moth

Leucanopsis affinella is a moth of the family Erebidae. It was described by Embrik Strand in 1919. It is found in Peru.
