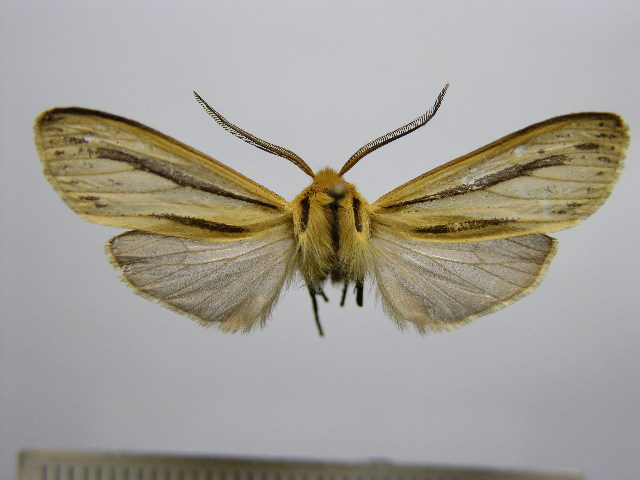

Scientific classification
- Domain: Eukaryota
- Kingdom: Animalia
- Phylum: Arthropoda
- Class: Insecta
- Order: Lepidoptera
- Superfamily: Noctuoidea
- Family: Erebidae
- Subfamily: Arctiinae
- Genus: Leucanopsis
- Species: L. orooca

Binomial name
- Leucanopsis orooca (Schaus, 1924)

Synonyms
- Halysidota orooca Schaus, 1924

= Leucanopsis orooca =

Species of moth

Leucanopsis orooca is a moth of the family Erebidae. It was described by William Schaus in 1924. It is found in Bolivia and Argentina.
