= Leucanopsis daltona =

Scientific classification
- Domain: Eukaryota
- Kingdom: Animalia
- Phylum: Arthropoda
- Class: Insecta
- Order: Lepidoptera
- Superfamily: Noctuoidea
- Family: Erebidae
- Subfamily: Arctiinae
- Genus: Leucanopsis
- Species: L. daltona

Binomial name
- Leucanopsis daltona (Schaus, 1941)

Synonyms
- Halisidota daltona Schaus, 1941; Leucanopsis daltoni Schaus, 1941; Leucanopsis daltoni Watson & Goodger, 1986

Species of moth

Leucanopsis daltona is a moth of the family Erebidae. It was described by William Schaus in 1941. It is found in Brazil.
