= Leucanopsis acuta =

Scientific classification
- Kingdom: Animalia
- Phylum: Arthropoda
- Class: Insecta
- Order: Lepidoptera
- Superfamily: Noctuoidea
- Family: Erebidae
- Subfamily: Arctiinae
- Genus: Leucanopsis
- Species: L. acuta

Binomial name
- Leucanopsis acuta (Hampson, 1901)

Synonyms
- Halysidota acuta Hampson, 1901; Halysidota grota Schaus, 1941; Leucanopsis grota (Schaus, 1941)

Species of moth

Leucanopsis acuta is a moth of the family Erebidae. It was described by George Hampson in 1901. It is found in Brazil.
