= Leucanopsis zozinna =

Scientific classification
- Domain: Eukaryota
- Kingdom: Animalia
- Phylum: Arthropoda
- Class: Insecta
- Order: Lepidoptera
- Superfamily: Noctuoidea
- Family: Erebidae
- Subfamily: Arctiinae
- Genus: Leucanopsis
- Species: L. zozinna

Binomial name
- Leucanopsis zozinna (Schaus, 1933)

Synonyms
- Halysidota zozinna Schaus, 1933

Species of moth

Leucanopsis zozinna is a moth of the family Erebidae. It was described by William Schaus in 1933. It is found in Colombia.
