= Leucanopsis cirphis =

Scientific classification
- Domain: Eukaryota
- Kingdom: Animalia
- Phylum: Arthropoda
- Class: Insecta
- Order: Lepidoptera
- Superfamily: Noctuoidea
- Family: Erebidae
- Subfamily: Arctiinae
- Genus: Leucanopsis
- Species: L. cirphis

Binomial name
- Leucanopsis cirphis (Schaus, 1911)

Synonyms
- Halysidota cirphis Schaus, 1911

Species of moth

Leucanopsis cirphis is a moth of the family Erebidae. It was described by William Schaus in 1911. It is found in Costa Rica.
