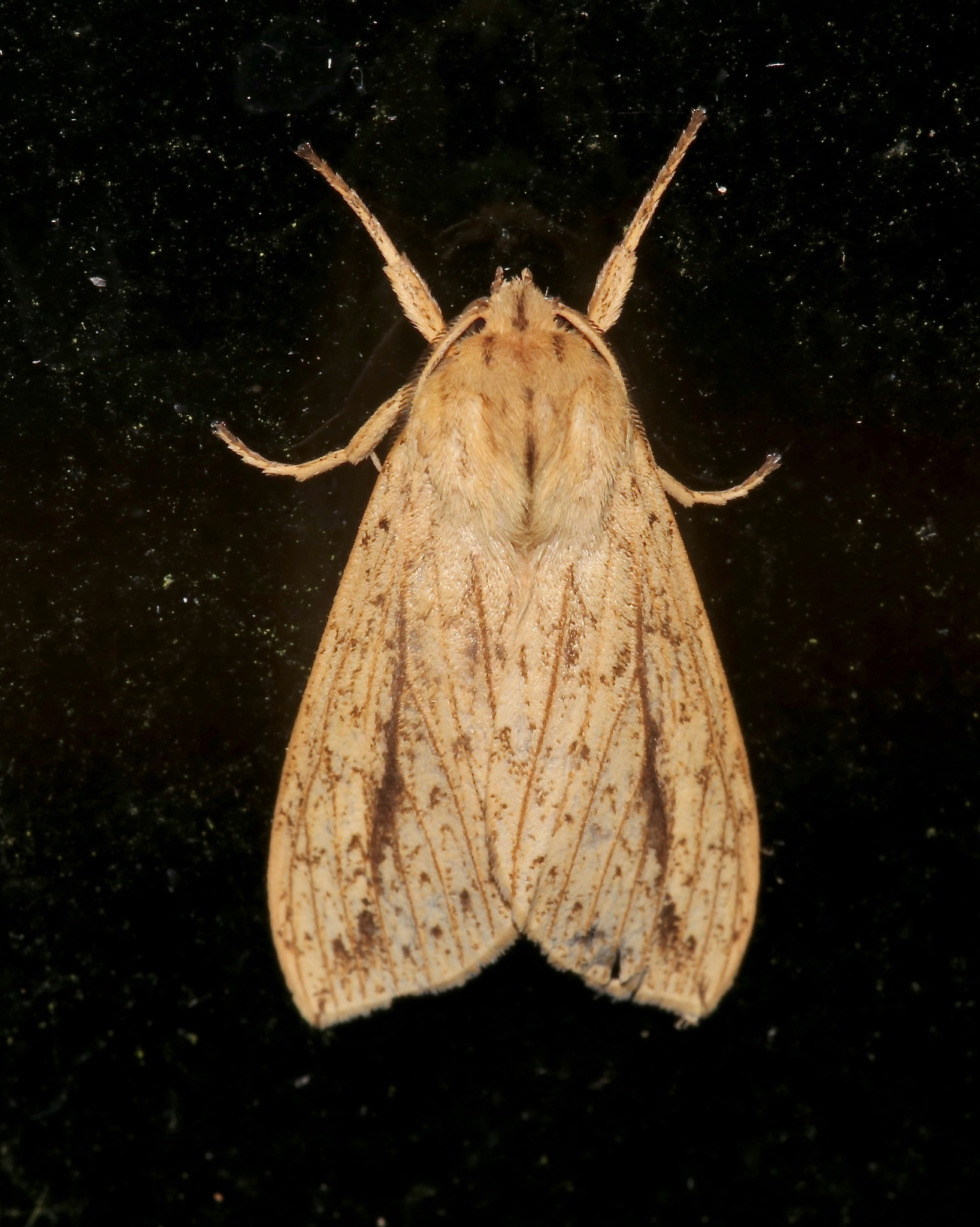

Scientific classification
- Kingdom: Animalia
- Phylum: Arthropoda
- Class: Insecta
- Order: Lepidoptera
- Superfamily: Noctuoidea
- Family: Erebidae
- Subfamily: Arctiinae
- Genus: Leucanopsis
- Species: L. longa

Binomial name
- Leucanopsis longa (Grote, 1880)

Synonyms
- Euphalisidota longa Grote, 1880; Halisidota longa

= Leucanopsis longa =

Species of moth

Leucanopsis longa, the long-streaked tussock moth or long-streaked halisidota, is a moth of the family Erebidae. It was described by Augustus Radcliffe Grote in 1880. It is found from North Carolina to Florida and west along the coast to eastern Texas. The habitat consists of marshes and wet sedge meadows.
