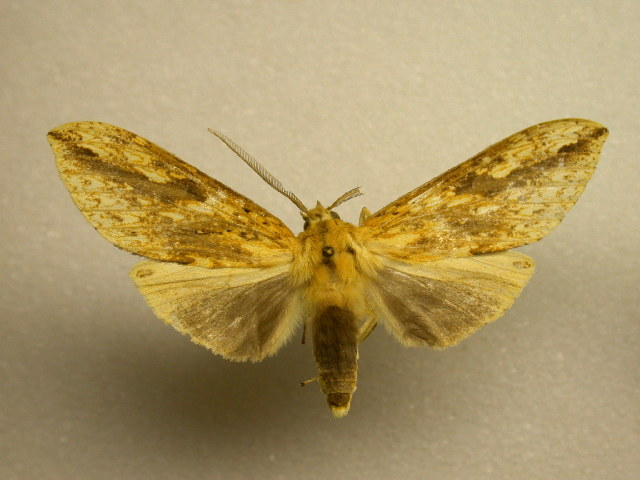

Scientific classification
- Kingdom: Animalia
- Phylum: Arthropoda
- Clade: Pancrustacea
- Class: Insecta
- Order: Lepidoptera
- Superfamily: Noctuoidea
- Family: Erebidae
- Subfamily: Arctiinae
- Genus: Leucanopsis
- Species: L. turrialba

Binomial name
- Leucanopsis turrialba (Schaus, 1911)

Synonyms
- Halysidota turrialba Schaus, 1911

= Leucanopsis turrialba =

Species of moth

Leucanopsis turrialba is a moth in the family Erebidae. It was described by William Schaus in 1911. It is found in Costa Rica and Guatemala.
