= Leucanopsis rufoochracea =

Scientific classification
- Domain: Eukaryota
- Kingdom: Animalia
- Phylum: Arthropoda
- Class: Insecta
- Order: Lepidoptera
- Superfamily: Noctuoidea
- Family: Erebidae
- Subfamily: Arctiinae
- Genus: Leucanopsis
- Species: L. rufoochracea

Binomial name
- Leucanopsis rufoochracea (Rothschild, 1922)

Synonyms
- Halysidota rufoochracea Rothschild, 1922

Species of moth

Leucanopsis rufoochracea is a moth in the family Erebidae. It was described by Walter Rothschild in 1922. It is found in Brazil.
