= Leucanopsis pulverulenta =

Scientific classification
- Domain: Eukaryota
- Kingdom: Animalia
- Phylum: Arthropoda
- Class: Insecta
- Order: Lepidoptera
- Superfamily: Noctuoidea
- Family: Erebidae
- Subfamily: Arctiinae
- Genus: Leucanopsis
- Species: L. pulverulenta

Binomial name
- Leucanopsis pulverulenta (Dognin, 1923)

Synonyms
- Halysidota pulverulenta Dognin, 1923

Species of moth

Leucanopsis pulverulenta is a moth of the family Erebidae. It was described by Paul Dognin in 1923. It is found in Brazil.
