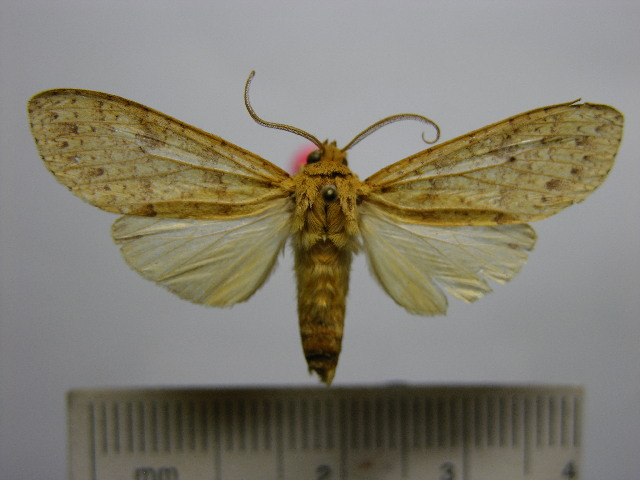

Scientific classification
- Domain: Eukaryota
- Kingdom: Animalia
- Phylum: Arthropoda
- Class: Insecta
- Order: Lepidoptera
- Superfamily: Noctuoidea
- Family: Erebidae
- Subfamily: Arctiinae
- Genus: Leucanopsis
- Species: L. ephrem

Binomial name
- Leucanopsis ephrem (Schaus, 1905)

Synonyms
- Halysidota ephrem Schaus, 1905

= Leucanopsis ephrem =

Species of moth

Leucanopsis ephrem is a moth of the family Erebidae. It was described by William Schaus in 1905. It is found in Bolivia and Peru.
