= Leucanopsis vangetta =

Scientific classification
- Kingdom: Animalia
- Phylum: Arthropoda
- Class: Insecta
- Order: Lepidoptera
- Superfamily: Noctuoidea
- Family: Erebidae
- Subfamily: Arctiinae
- Genus: Leucanopsis
- Species: L. vangetta

Binomial name
- Leucanopsis vangetta (Dyar, 1910)

Synonyms
- Halysidota vangetta Dyar, 1910

Species of moth

Leucanopsis vangetta is a moth of the family Erebidae. It was described by Harrison Gray Dyar Jr. in 1910. It is found in Mexico.
