= Leucanopsis dissimilis =

Scientific classification
- Domain: Eukaryota
- Kingdom: Animalia
- Phylum: Arthropoda
- Class: Insecta
- Order: Lepidoptera
- Superfamily: Noctuoidea
- Family: Erebidae
- Subfamily: Arctiinae
- Genus: Leucanopsis
- Species: L. dissimilis

Binomial name
- Leucanopsis dissimilis (Reich, 1935)

Synonyms
- Halysidota dissimilis Reich, 1935

Species of moth

Leucanopsis dissimilis is a moth of the family Erebidae. It was described by Reich in 1935. It is found in Brazil.
