= Leucanopsis tanamo =

Scientific classification
- Kingdom: Animalia
- Phylum: Arthropoda
- Class: Insecta
- Order: Lepidoptera
- Superfamily: Noctuoidea
- Family: Erebidae
- Subfamily: Arctiinae
- Genus: Leucanopsis
- Species: L. tanamo

Binomial name
- Leucanopsis tanamo (Schaus, 1904)

Synonyms
- Halysidota tanamo Schaus, 1904

Species of moth

Leucanopsis tanamo is a moth of the family Erebidae. It was described by William Schaus in 1904. It is found on Cuba.
