= Leucanopsis liparoides =

Scientific classification
- Kingdom: Animalia
- Phylum: Arthropoda
- Clade: Pancrustacea
- Class: Insecta
- Order: Lepidoptera
- Superfamily: Noctuoidea
- Family: Erebidae
- Subfamily: Arctiinae
- Genus: Leucanopsis
- Species: L. liparoides

Binomial name
- Leucanopsis liparoides (Rothschild, 1909)

Synonyms
- Halisidota liparoides Rothschild, 1909

Species of moth

Leucanopsis liparoides is a moth of the family Erebidae. It was described by Walter Rothschild in 1909. It is found in Suriname, Peru and Brazil.
