= Leucanopsis rosetta =

Scientific classification
- Domain: Eukaryota
- Kingdom: Animalia
- Phylum: Arthropoda
- Class: Insecta
- Order: Lepidoptera
- Superfamily: Noctuoidea
- Family: Erebidae
- Subfamily: Arctiinae
- Genus: Leucanopsis
- Species: L. rosetta

Binomial name
- Leucanopsis rosetta (Schaus, 1896)

Synonyms
- Halisidota rosetta Schaus, 1896

Species of moth

Leucanopsis rosetta is a moth of the family Erebidae. It was described by William Schaus in 1896. It is found in Brazil.
