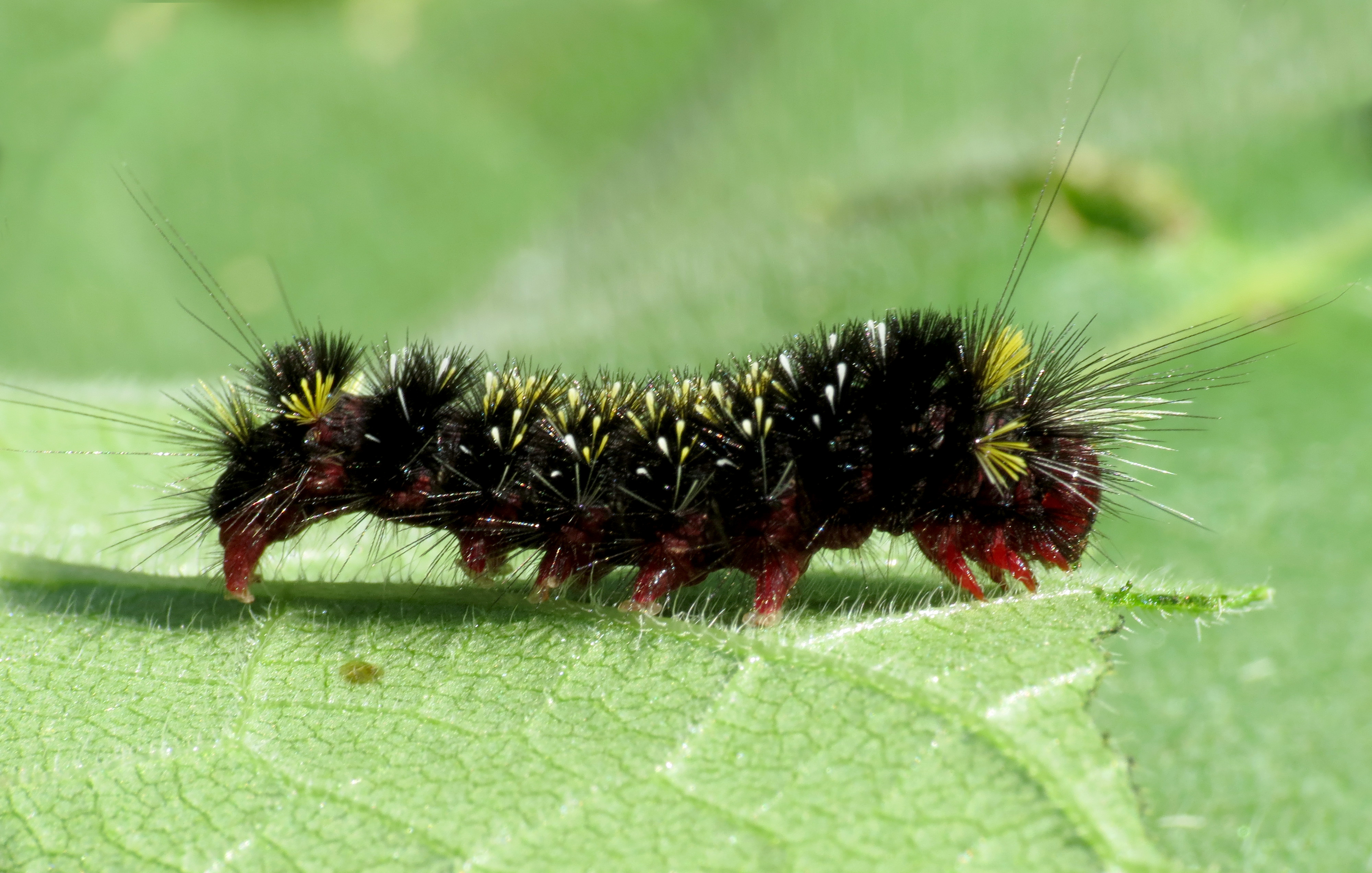

Scientific classification
- Kingdom: Animalia
- Phylum: Arthropoda
- Class: Insecta
- Order: Lepidoptera
- Superfamily: Noctuoidea
- Family: Erebidae
- Subfamily: Arctiinae
- Genus: Hypocrisias
- Species: H. minima

Binomial name
- Hypocrisias minima (Neumoegen, 1883)

Synonyms
- Halesidota minima Neumoegen, 1883; Halesidota armillata H. Edwards, 1884; Euhalisidota agelia H. Druce, 1890

= Hypocrisias minima =

Species of moth

Hypocrisias minima, the least hypocrisias, is a moth of the subfamily Arctiinae. The species was first described by Berthold Neumoegen in 1883. It is found in Mexico, southern Arizona, New Mexico, and Texas.

The wingspan is 31–33 mm.

The larvae feed on Viguiera dentata.
