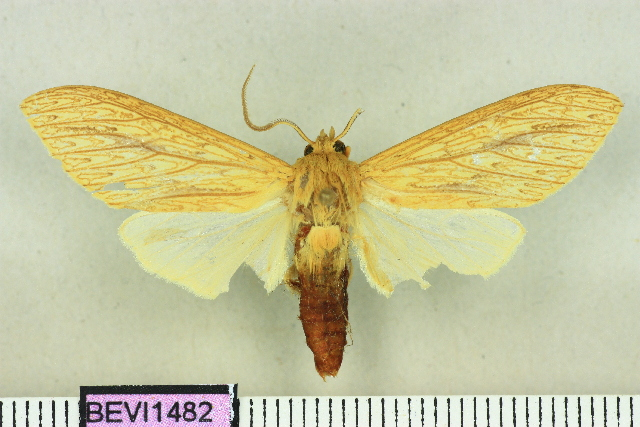

Scientific classification
- Kingdom: Animalia
- Phylum: Arthropoda
- Class: Insecta
- Order: Lepidoptera
- Superfamily: Noctuoidea
- Family: Erebidae
- Subfamily: Arctiinae
- Genus: Leucanopsis
- Species: L. polyodonta

Binomial name
- Leucanopsis polyodonta (Hampson, 1901)

Synonyms
- Halisidota polyodonta Hampson, 1901

= Leucanopsis polyodonta =

Species of moth

Leucanopsis polyodonta is a moth of the subfamily Arctiinae. It was described by George Hampson in 1901. It is found in French Guiana, Brazil and the Amazon region.
