= Leucanopsis pohli =

Scientific classification
- Domain: Eukaryota
- Kingdom: Animalia
- Phylum: Arthropoda
- Class: Insecta
- Order: Lepidoptera
- Superfamily: Noctuoidea
- Family: Erebidae
- Subfamily: Arctiinae
- Genus: Leucanopsis
- Species: L. pohli

Binomial name
- Leucanopsis pohli (Schaus, 1927)

Synonyms
- Halysidota pohli Schaus, 1927

Species of moth

Leucanopsis pohli is a moth of the family Erebidae. It was described by William Schaus in 1927. It is found in Brazil.
