= Leucanopsis squalida =

Scientific classification
- Domain: Eukaryota
- Kingdom: Animalia
- Phylum: Arthropoda
- Class: Insecta
- Order: Lepidoptera
- Superfamily: Noctuoidea
- Family: Erebidae
- Subfamily: Arctiinae
- Genus: Leucanopsis
- Species: L. squalida

Binomial name
- Leucanopsis squalida (Herrich-Schäffer, [1855])

Synonyms
- Phegoptera squalida Herrich-Schäffer, [1855]

Species of moth

Leucanopsis squalida is a moth of the subfamily Arctiinae. It was described by Gottlieb August Wilhelm Herrich-Schäffer in 1855. It is found in Brazil and Bolivia.
