= Leucanopsis luridioides =

Scientific classification
- Domain: Eukaryota
- Kingdom: Animalia
- Phylum: Arthropoda
- Class: Insecta
- Order: Lepidoptera
- Superfamily: Noctuoidea
- Family: Erebidae
- Subfamily: Arctiinae
- Genus: Leucanopsis
- Species: L. luridioides

Binomial name
- Leucanopsis luridioides (Rothschild, 1917)

Synonyms
- Halysidota luridioides Rothschild, 1917

Species of moth

Leucanopsis luridioides is a moth of the family Erebidae. It was described by Walter Rothschild in 1917. It is found in Colombia, Ecuador and Peru.
