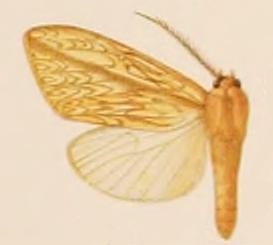

Scientific classification
- Domain: Eukaryota
- Kingdom: Animalia
- Phylum: Arthropoda
- Class: Insecta
- Order: Lepidoptera
- Superfamily: Noctuoidea
- Family: Erebidae
- Subfamily: Arctiinae
- Genus: Leucanopsis
- Species: L. dinellii

Binomial name
- Leucanopsis dinellii (Rothschild, 1909)

Synonyms
- Halysidota dinellii Rothschild, 1909

= Leucanopsis dinellii =

Species of moth

Leucanopsis dinellii is a moth of the family Erebidae first described by Walter Rothschild in 1909. It is found in Argentina.
