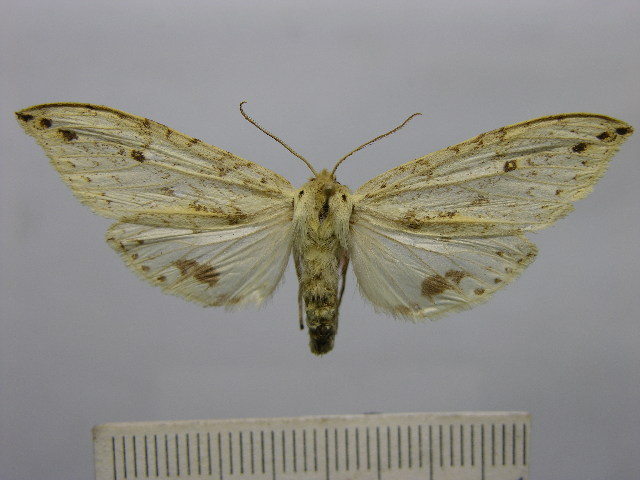

Scientific classification
- Kingdom: Animalia
- Phylum: Arthropoda
- Class: Insecta
- Order: Lepidoptera
- Superfamily: Noctuoidea
- Family: Erebidae
- Subfamily: Arctiinae
- Genus: Leucanopsis
- Species: L. apicepunctata

Binomial name
- Leucanopsis apicepunctata (Schaus, 1905)

Synonyms
- Halisidota apicepunctata Schaus, 1905

= Leucanopsis apicepunctata =

Species of moth

Leucanopsis apicepunctata is a moth of the family Erebidae. It was described by William Schaus in 1905. It is found in Peru, Ecuador and Bolivia.
