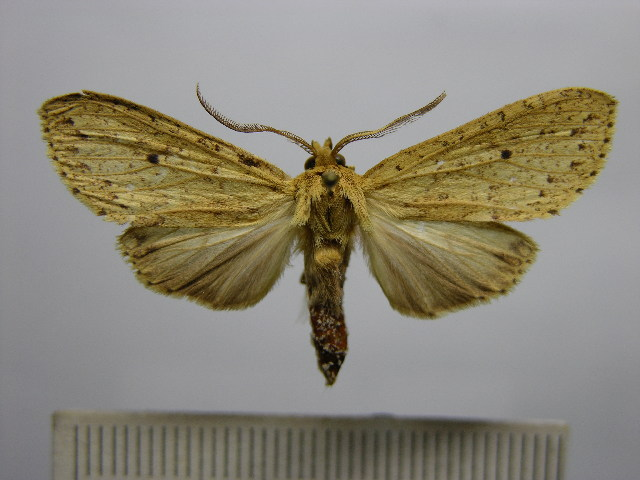

Scientific classification
- Domain: Eukaryota
- Kingdom: Animalia
- Phylum: Arthropoda
- Class: Insecta
- Order: Lepidoptera
- Superfamily: Noctuoidea
- Family: Erebidae
- Subfamily: Arctiinae
- Genus: Leucanopsis
- Species: L. subterranea

Binomial name
- Leucanopsis subterranea (Rothschild, 1909)

Synonyms
- Halysidota subterranea Rothschild, 1909

= Leucanopsis subterranea =

Species of moth

Leucanopsis subterranea is a moth of the family Erebidae first described by Walter Rothschild in 1909. It is found in Argentina, Peru and Ecuador.
