= Leucanopsis sablona =

Scientific classification
- Domain: Eukaryota
- Kingdom: Animalia
- Phylum: Arthropoda
- Class: Insecta
- Order: Lepidoptera
- Superfamily: Noctuoidea
- Family: Erebidae
- Subfamily: Arctiinae
- Genus: Leucanopsis
- Species: L. sablona

Binomial name
- Leucanopsis sablona (Schaus, 1896)

Synonyms
- Euhalisidota sablona Schaus, 1896; Halisidota sablona

Species of moth

Leucanopsis sablona is a moth of the family Erebidae. It was described by William Schaus in 1896. It is found in Brazil.
