= Hypocrisias punctatus =

Scientific classification
- Domain: Eukaryota
- Kingdom: Animalia
- Phylum: Arthropoda
- Class: Insecta
- Order: Lepidoptera
- Superfamily: Noctuoidea
- Family: Erebidae
- Subfamily: Arctiinae
- Genus: Hypocrisias
- Species: H. punctatus

Binomial name
- Hypocrisias punctatus (H. Druce, 1884)

Synonyms
- Purius punctatus H. Druce, 1884

Species of moth

Hypocrisias punctatus is a moth of the subfamily Arctiinae. It was described by Herbert Druce in 1884. It is found in Guatemala.
