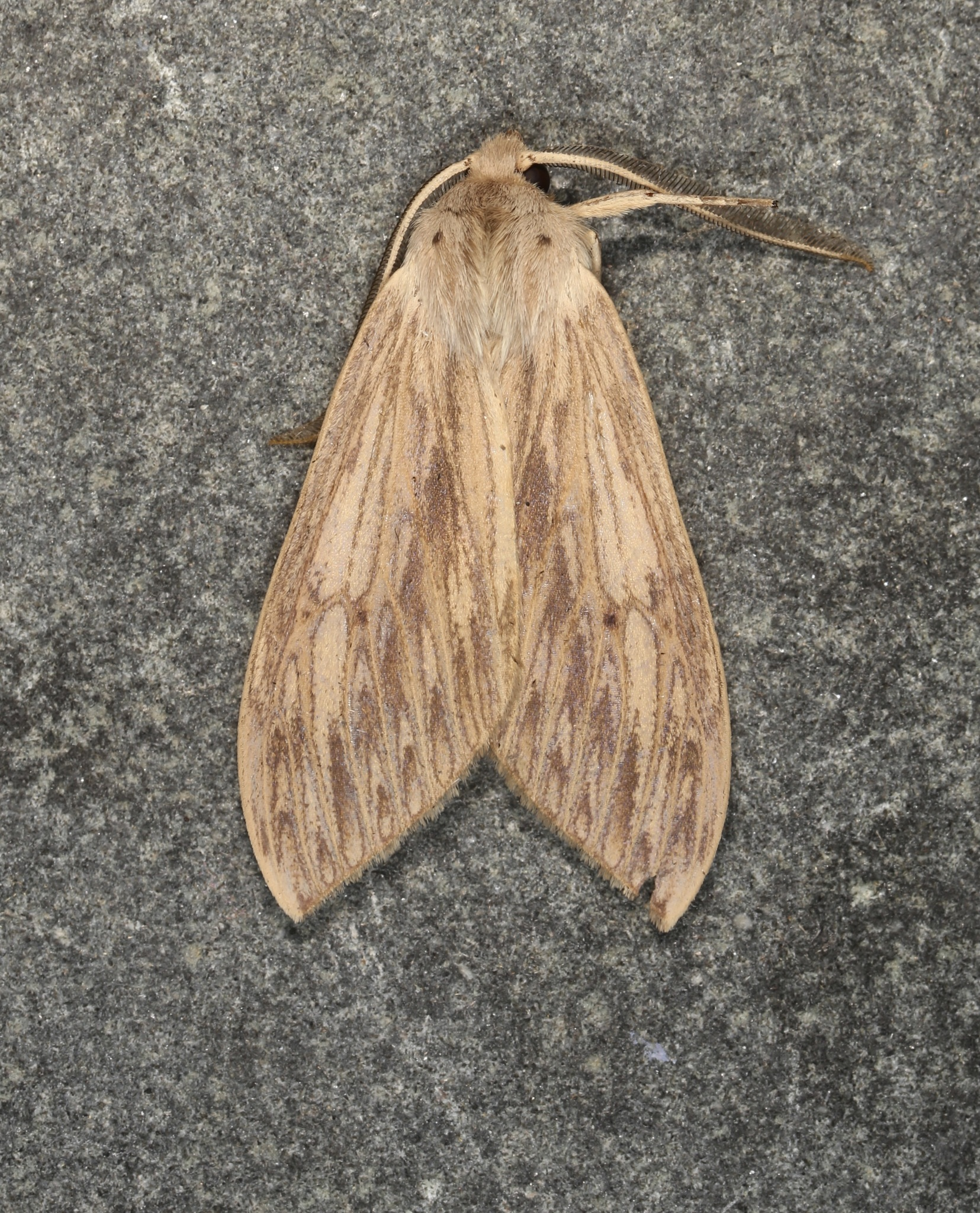

Scientific classification
- Domain: Eukaryota
- Kingdom: Animalia
- Phylum: Arthropoda
- Class: Insecta
- Order: Lepidoptera
- Superfamily: Noctuoidea
- Family: Erebidae
- Subfamily: Arctiinae
- Genus: Leucanopsis
- Species: L. lurida

Binomial name
- Leucanopsis lurida (H. Edwards, 1887)

Synonyms
- Halisidota lurida H. Edwards, 1887; Euhalisidota otho Barnes, 1901

= Leucanopsis lurida =

Species of moth

Leucanopsis lurida is a moth of the family Erebidae. It was described by Henry Edwards in 1887. It is found in Colombia, Mexico and southern Arizona in the United States.

The wingspan is 52–55 mm. Adults have been recorded on wing from July to September.

The larvae feed Quercus douglasii.
