= Leucanopsis bactris =

Scientific classification
- Domain: Eukaryota
- Kingdom: Animalia
- Phylum: Arthropoda
- Class: Insecta
- Order: Lepidoptera
- Superfamily: Noctuoidea
- Family: Erebidae
- Subfamily: Arctiinae
- Genus: Leucanopsis
- Species: L. bactris

Binomial name
- Leucanopsis bactris (Sepp, [1852])

Synonyms
- Noctua bactris Sepp, [1852]

Species of moth

Leucanopsis bactris is a moth of the family Erebidae. It was described by Sepp in 1852. It is found in Suriname, Ecuador, Peru and Bolivia.

The larvae have been recorded feeding on Bactris acanthocarpa.
