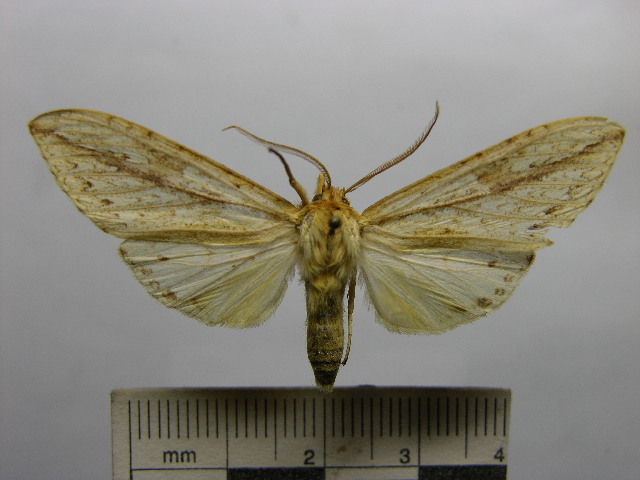

Scientific classification
- Domain: Eukaryota
- Kingdom: Animalia
- Phylum: Arthropoda
- Class: Insecta
- Order: Lepidoptera
- Superfamily: Noctuoidea
- Family: Erebidae
- Subfamily: Arctiinae
- Genus: Leucanopsis
- Species: L. nubilosus

Binomial name
- Leucanopsis nubilosus (Rothschild, 1909)

Synonyms
- Halisidota nubilosus Rothschild, 1909

= Leucanopsis nubilosus =

Species of moth

Leucanopsis nubilosus is a moth of the family Erebidae. It was described by Walter Rothschild in 1909. It is found in Peru and Bolivia.
