= Leucanopsis dogniniana =

Scientific classification
- Domain: Eukaryota
- Kingdom: Animalia
- Phylum: Arthropoda
- Class: Insecta
- Order: Lepidoptera
- Superfamily: Noctuoidea
- Family: Erebidae
- Subfamily: Arctiinae
- Genus: Leucanopsis
- Species: L. dogniniana

Binomial name
- Leucanopsis dogniniana (Strand, 1919)

Synonyms
- Halysidota dogniniana Strand, 1919; Halysidota fassli Dognin, 1911 (preocc. Rothschild, 1911)

Species of moth

Leucanopsis dogniniana is a moth of the subfamily Arctiinae. It was described by Strand in 1919. It is found in Colombia.
