= Leucanopsis velivolans =

Scientific classification
- Kingdom: Animalia
- Phylum: Arthropoda
- Class: Insecta
- Order: Lepidoptera
- Superfamily: Noctuoidea
- Family: Erebidae
- Subfamily: Arctiinae
- Genus: Leucanopsis
- Species: L. velivolans

Binomial name
- Leucanopsis velivolans (Dyar, 1920)

Synonyms
- Hypocrisias velivolans Dyar, 1920

Species of moth

Leucanopsis velivolans is a moth of the subfamily Arctiinae. It was described by Harrison Gray Dyar Jr. in 1920. It is found in Mexico.
