= Leucanopsis cirphoides =

Scientific classification
- Domain: Eukaryota
- Kingdom: Animalia
- Phylum: Arthropoda
- Class: Insecta
- Order: Lepidoptera
- Superfamily: Noctuoidea
- Family: Erebidae
- Subfamily: Arctiinae
- Genus: Leucanopsis
- Species: L. cirphoides

Binomial name
- Leucanopsis cirphoides (Rothschild, 1916)

Synonyms
- Halysidota cirphoides Rothschild, 1916

Species of moth

Leucanopsis cirphoides is a moth of the family Erebidae. It was described by Walter Rothschild in 1916. It is found in Colombia.
