= Leucanopsis siegruna =

Scientific classification
- Kingdom: Animalia
- Phylum: Arthropoda
- Clade: Pancrustacea
- Class: Insecta
- Order: Lepidoptera
- Superfamily: Noctuoidea
- Family: Erebidae
- Subfamily: Arctiinae
- Genus: Leucanopsis
- Species: L. siegruna

Binomial name
- Leucanopsis siegruna (Schaus, 1941)

Synonyms
- Halysidota siegruna Schaus, 1941

Species of moth

Leucanopsis siegruna is a moth of the family Erebidae. It was described by William Schaus in 1941. It is found in Brazil.

== Sources ==
- Pitkin, Brian & Jenkins, Paul (2023). "Search results Family: Arctiidae". Butterflies and Moths of the World. Natural History Museum, London. doi:10.5519/s93616qw.
