= Leucanopsis ochracea =

Scientific classification
- Domain: Eukaryota
- Kingdom: Animalia
- Phylum: Arthropoda
- Class: Insecta
- Order: Lepidoptera
- Superfamily: Noctuoidea
- Family: Erebidae
- Subfamily: Arctiinae
- Genus: Leucanopsis
- Species: L. ochracea

Binomial name
- Leucanopsis ochracea (Möschler, 1883)

Synonyms
- Halisidota ochracea Möschler, 1883

Species of moth

Leucanopsis ochracea is a moth of the subfamily Arctiinae. It was described by Heinrich Benno Möschler in 1883. It is found in Suriname.
