= Leucanopsis malodonta =

Scientific classification
- Kingdom: Animalia
- Phylum: Arthropoda
- Class: Insecta
- Order: Lepidoptera
- Superfamily: Noctuoidea
- Family: Erebidae
- Subfamily: Arctiinae
- Genus: Leucanopsis
- Species: L. malodonta

Binomial name
- Leucanopsis malodonta (Dyar, 1914)

Synonyms
- Halysidota malodonta Dyar, 1914

Species of moth

Leucanopsis malodonta is a moth of the family Erebidae, and was described by Harrison Gray Dyar Jr. in 1914. Leucanopsis malodonta can be found in Peru.
