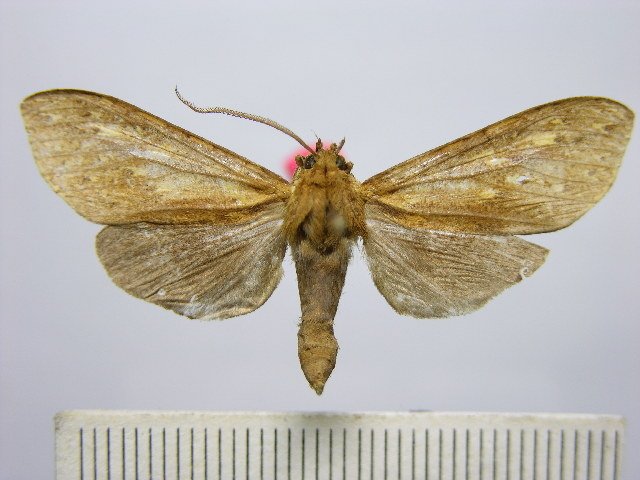

Scientific classification
- Domain: Eukaryota
- Kingdom: Animalia
- Phylum: Arthropoda
- Class: Insecta
- Order: Lepidoptera
- Superfamily: Noctuoidea
- Family: Erebidae
- Subfamily: Arctiinae
- Genus: Leucanopsis
- Species: L. umbrina

Binomial name
- Leucanopsis umbrina (Rothschild, 1910)

Synonyms
- Halisidota umbrina Rothschild, 1910

= Leucanopsis umbrina =

Species of insect (moth)

Leucanopsis umbrina is a moth of the family Erebidae. It was described by Walter Rothschild in 1910. It is found in Brazil and Peru.
