= Leucanopsis oruboides =

Scientific classification
- Domain: Eukaryota
- Kingdom: Animalia
- Phylum: Arthropoda
- Class: Insecta
- Order: Lepidoptera
- Superfamily: Noctuoidea
- Family: Erebidae
- Subfamily: Arctiinae
- Genus: Leucanopsis
- Species: L. oruboides

Binomial name
- Leucanopsis oruboides (Rothschild, 1909)

Synonyms
- Halisidota oruboides Rothschild, 1909

Species of moth

Leucanopsis oruboides is a moth of the subfamily Arctiinae. It was described by Rothschild in 1909. It is found in Peru.
