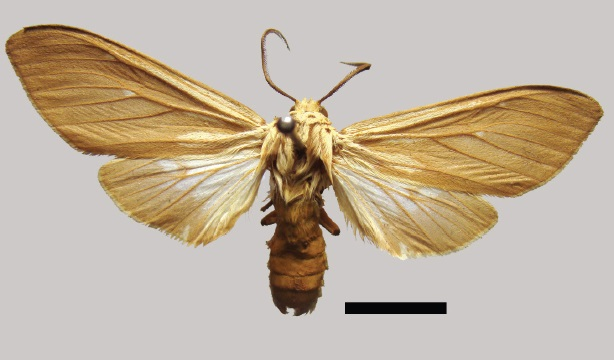

Scientific classification
- Kingdom: Animalia
- Phylum: Arthropoda
- Class: Insecta
- Order: Lepidoptera
- Superfamily: Noctuoidea
- Family: Erebidae
- Subfamily: Arctiinae
- Genus: Hypocrisias
- Species: H. fuscipennis

Binomial name
- Hypocrisias fuscipennis (Burmeister, 1878)

Synonyms
- Halesidota fuscipennis Burmeister, 1878; Phaegoptera jonesi Schaus, 1894; Hypocrisias jonesi

= Hypocrisias fuscipennis =

Species of moth

Hypocrisias fuscipennis is a moth of the subfamily Arctiinae. It was described by Hermann Burmeister in 1878. It is found in Argentina and Brazil.
