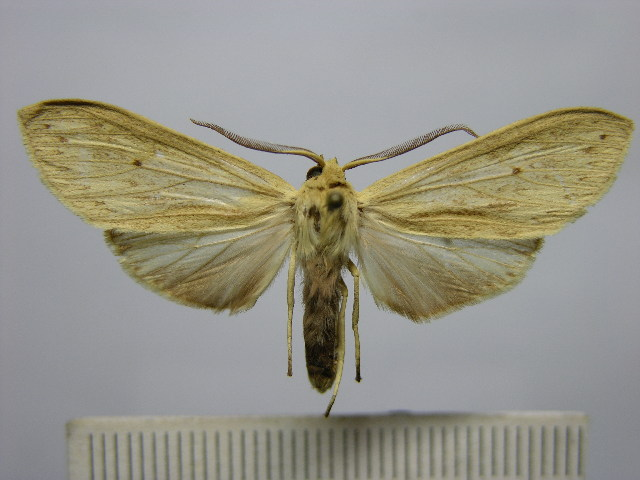

Scientific classification
- Domain: Eukaryota
- Kingdom: Animalia
- Phylum: Arthropoda
- Class: Insecta
- Order: Lepidoptera
- Superfamily: Noctuoidea
- Family: Erebidae
- Subfamily: Arctiinae
- Genus: Leucanopsis
- Species: L. falacroides

Binomial name
- Leucanopsis falacroides (Rothschild, 1909)

Synonyms
- Halysidota falacroides Rothschild, 1909

= Leucanopsis falacroides =

Species of moth

Leucanopsis falacroides is a moth of the family Erebidae first described by Walter Rothschild in 1909. It is found in Peru, Ecuador and Bolivia.
