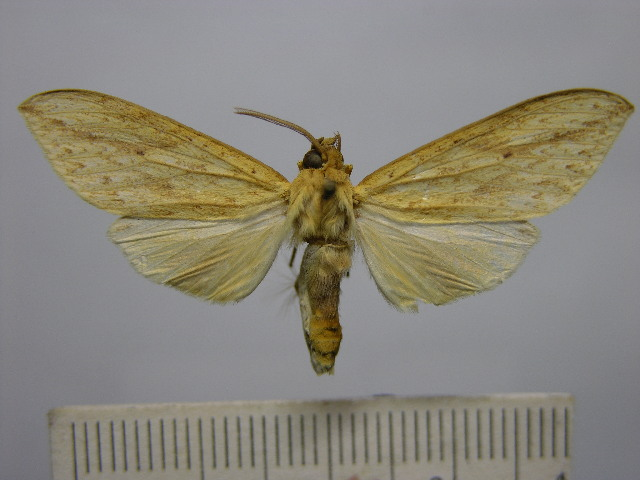

Scientific classification
- Domain: Eukaryota
- Kingdom: Animalia
- Phylum: Arthropoda
- Class: Insecta
- Order: Lepidoptera
- Superfamily: Noctuoidea
- Family: Erebidae
- Subfamily: Arctiinae
- Genus: Leucanopsis
- Species: L. democrata

Binomial name
- Leucanopsis democrata (Schaus, 1920)

Synonyms
- Halysidota democrata Schaus, 1920

= Leucanopsis democrata =

Species of moth

Leucanopsis democrata is a moth of the family Erebidae. It was described by William Schaus in 1920. It is found in Guatemala.
