= Leucanopsis stipulatoides =

Scientific classification
- Domain: Eukaryota
- Kingdom: Animalia
- Phylum: Arthropoda
- Class: Insecta
- Order: Lepidoptera
- Superfamily: Noctuoidea
- Family: Erebidae
- Subfamily: Arctiinae
- Genus: Leucanopsis
- Species: L. stipulatoides

Binomial name
- Leucanopsis stipulatoides (Rothschild, 1910)

Synonyms
- Halisidota stipulatoides Rothschild, 1910

Species of moth

Leucanopsis stipulatoides is a moth of the family Erebidae. It was described by Walter Rothschild in 1910. It is found in Guyana and Venezuela.

Further information about its habitat, behavior, and ecological significance remains limited in the scientific literature.
