= Leucanopsis cedon =

Scientific classification
- Domain: Eukaryota
- Kingdom: Animalia
- Phylum: Arthropoda
- Class: Insecta
- Order: Lepidoptera
- Superfamily: Noctuoidea
- Family: Erebidae
- Subfamily: Arctiinae
- Genus: Leucanopsis
- Species: L. cedon

Binomial name
- Leucanopsis cedon (H. Druce, 1897)

Synonyms
- Halisidota cedon H. Druce, 1897

Species of moth

Leucanopsis cedon is a moth of the family Erebidae. It was described by Herbert Druce in 1897. It is found in Panama, Brazil, Peru, French Guiana, Venezuela, Ecuador and Bolivia.
