= Leucanopsis goodgeri =

Scientific classification
- Kingdom: Animalia
- Phylum: Arthropoda
- Class: Insecta
- Order: Lepidoptera
- Superfamily: Noctuoidea
- Family: Erebidae
- Subfamily: Arctiinae
- Genus: Leucanopsis
- Species: L. goodgeri

Binomial name
- Leucanopsis goodgeri Toulgoët, 2003

Species of moth

Leucanopsis goodgeri is a moth of the family Erebidae. It was described by Hervé de Toulgoët in 2003. It is found in Peru.
