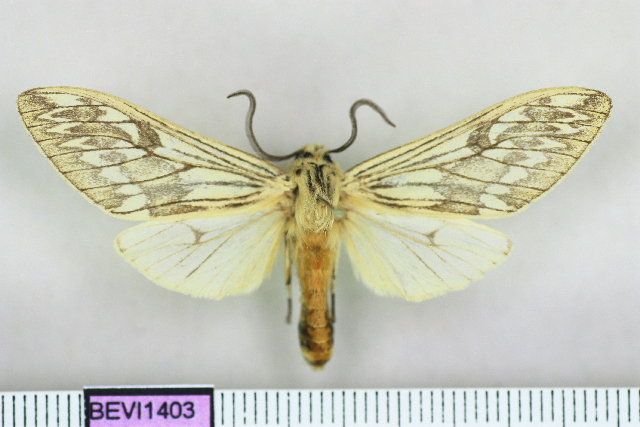
- Hypocrisias fuscipennis

Scientific classification
- Kingdom: Animalia
- Phylum: Arthropoda
- Class: Insecta
- Order: Lepidoptera
- Superfamily: Noctuoidea
- Family: Erebidae
- Subfamily: Arctiinae
- Subtribe: Phaegopterina
- Genus: Hypocrisias; Hampson, 1901

= Hypocrisias =

Genus of moths

Hypocrisias is a genus of moths in the family Erebidae erected by George Hampson in 1901.

== Species ==
- Hypocrisias berthula Dyar, 1912
- Hypocrisias fuscipennis (Burmeister, 1878)
- Hypocrisias gemella Schaus, 1911
- Hypocrisias lisoma Dyar, 1912
- Hypocrisias lua (Dyar, 1910)
- Hypocrisias minima (Neumoegen, 1883)
- Hypocrisias punctatus (Druce, 1884)
