= Leucanopsis obvia =

Scientific classification
- Domain: Eukaryota
- Kingdom: Animalia
- Phylum: Arthropoda
- Class: Insecta
- Order: Lepidoptera
- Superfamily: Noctuoidea
- Family: Erebidae
- Subfamily: Arctiinae
- Genus: Leucanopsis
- Species: L. obvia

Binomial name
- Leucanopsis obvia (Dognin, 1909)

Synonyms
- Halisidota obvia Dognin, 1909

Species of moth

Leucanopsis obvia is a moth of the family Erebidae. It was described by Paul Dognin in 1909. It is found in French Guiana, Suriname, Brazil, Venezuela, Ecuador and Peru.
