= Leucanopsis mandus =

Scientific classification
- Domain: Eukaryota
- Kingdom: Animalia
- Phylum: Arthropoda
- Class: Insecta
- Order: Lepidoptera
- Superfamily: Noctuoidea
- Family: Erebidae
- Subfamily: Arctiinae
- Genus: Leucanopsis
- Species: L. mandus

Binomial name
- Leucanopsis mandus (Herrich-Schäffer, [1855])

Synonyms
- Phegoptera mandus Herrich-Schäffer, [1855]; Halisidota mandus

Species of moth

Leucanopsis mandus is a moth of the family Erebidae found in Brazil. It was described by Gottlieb August Wilhelm Herrich-Schäffer in 1855.
