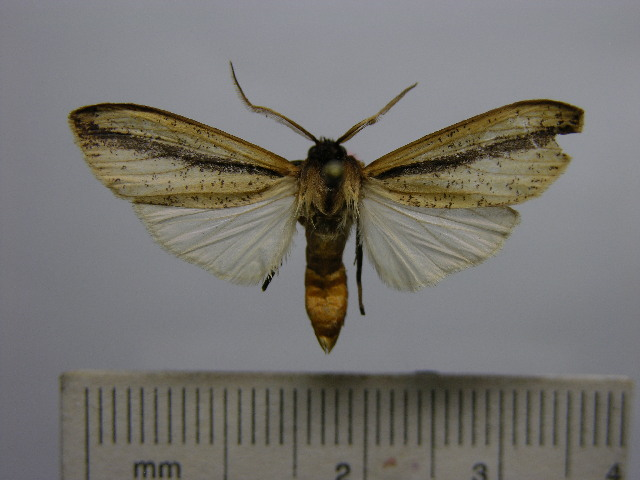

Scientific classification
- Domain: Eukaryota
- Kingdom: Animalia
- Phylum: Arthropoda
- Class: Insecta
- Order: Lepidoptera
- Superfamily: Noctuoidea
- Family: Erebidae
- Subfamily: Arctiinae
- Genus: Leucanopsis
- Species: L. lineata

Binomial name
- Leucanopsis lineata (Schaus, 1894)

Synonyms
- Halisidota lineata Schaus, 1894

= Leucanopsis lineata =

Species of moth

Leucanopsis lineata is a moth of the family Erebidae. It was described by William Schaus in 1894. It is found in Brazil and Paraguay.
