= Leucanopsis pseudofalacra =

Scientific classification
- Domain: Eukaryota
- Kingdom: Animalia
- Phylum: Arthropoda
- Class: Insecta
- Order: Lepidoptera
- Superfamily: Noctuoidea
- Family: Erebidae
- Subfamily: Arctiinae
- Genus: Leucanopsis
- Species: L. pseudofalacra

Binomial name
- Leucanopsis pseudofalacra (Rothschild, 1917)

Synonyms
- Halysidota pseudofalacra Rothschild, 1917

Species of moth

Leucanopsis pseudofalacra is a moth of the family Erebidae. It was described by Walter Rothschild in 1917. It is found in Nicaragua.
