= Leucanopsis leucanina =

Scientific classification
- Domain: Eukaryota
- Kingdom: Animalia
- Phylum: Arthropoda
- Class: Insecta
- Order: Lepidoptera
- Superfamily: Noctuoidea
- Family: Erebidae
- Subfamily: Arctiinae
- Genus: Leucanopsis
- Species: L. leucanina

Binomial name
- Leucanopsis leucanina (C. Felder, R. Felder & Rogenhofer, 1874)

Synonyms
- Halesidota leucanina C. Felder, R. Felder & Rogenhofer, 1874; Halisidota phellia Druce, 1889

Species of moth

Leucanopsis leucanina is a moth of the family Erebidae. It was described by Cajetan Felder, Rudolf Felder and Alois Friedrich Rogenhofer in 1874. It is found in Colombia, Ecuador and Brazil.
