= Hypocrisias lua =

Scientific classification
- Kingdom: Animalia
- Phylum: Arthropoda
- Class: Insecta
- Order: Lepidoptera
- Superfamily: Noctuoidea
- Family: Erebidae
- Subfamily: Arctiinae
- Genus: Hypocrisias
- Species: H. lua

Binomial name
- Hypocrisias lua (Dyar, 1910)

Synonyms
- Halysidota lua Dyar, 1910; Leucanopsis lua (Dyar, 1910)

Species of moth

Hypocrisias lua is a moth of the family Erebidae. It was described by Harrison Gray Dyar Jr. in 1910. It is found in Mexico.
