= Prosopidia =

Scientific classification
- Kingdom: Animalia
- Phylum: Arthropoda
- Class: Insecta
- Order: Lepidoptera
- Superfamily: Noctuoidea
- Family: Erebidae
- Subfamily: Arctiinae
- Genus: Prosopidia; Bryk, 1953

Genus of moths

Prosopidia is a genus of moths in the subfamily Arctiinae.

== Species ==
- Prosopidia caeruleocephala Rothschild, 1912
- Prosopidia meruloides Schaus, 1905
- Prosopidia morosa Schaus, 1910

== Former species ==
- Prosopidia merula Dognin, 1891
