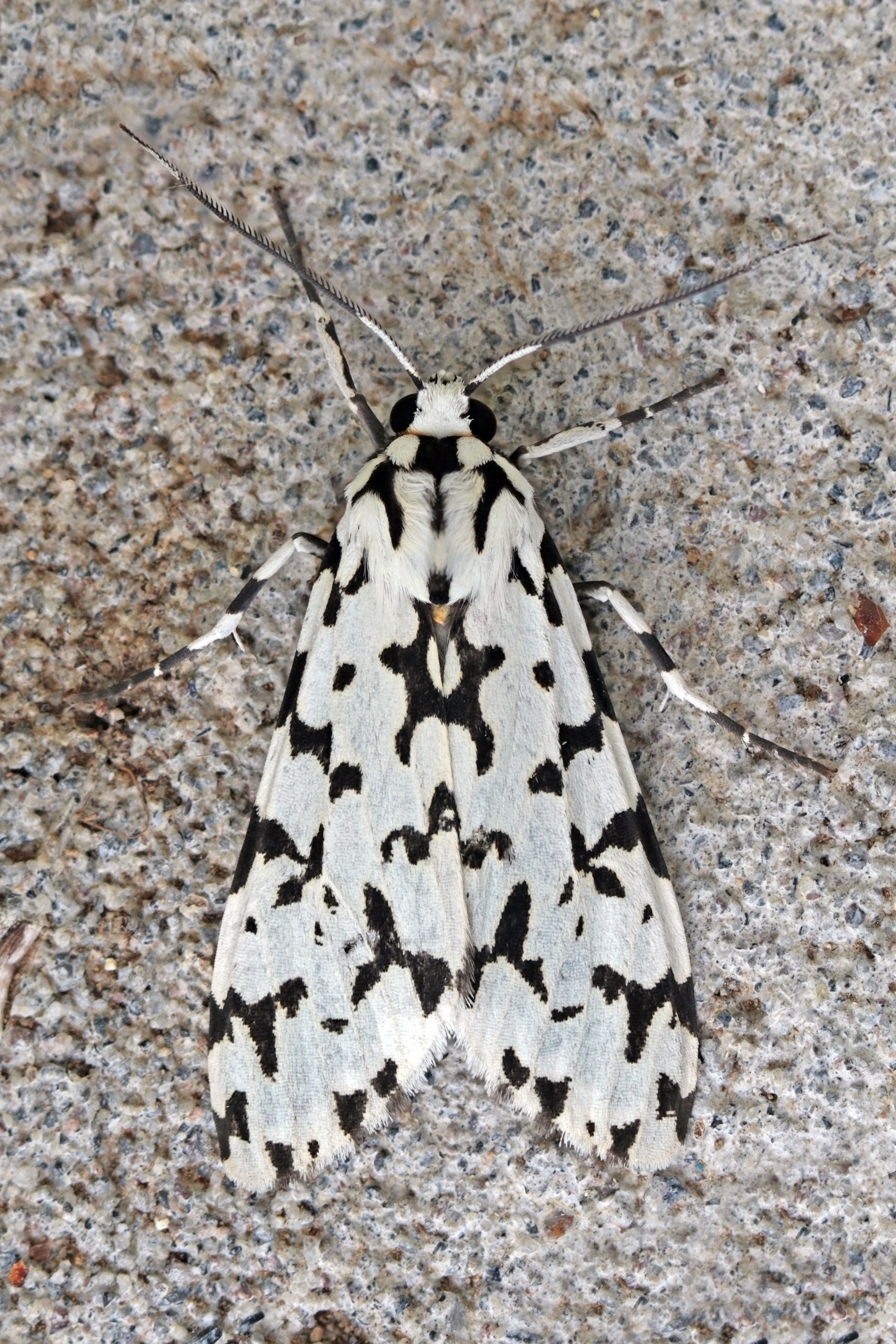
- E. pica tigrata Mount Totumas cloud forest, Panama

Scientific classification
- Kingdom: Animalia
- Phylum: Arthropoda
- Clade: Pancrustacea
- Class: Insecta
- Order: Lepidoptera
- Superfamily: Noctuoidea
- Family: Erebidae
- Subfamily: Arctiinae
- Subtribe: Ctenuchina
- Genus: Eucereon; Hübner, [1819]

Synonyms
- Erithales Poey, 1832; Ilipa Walker, 1854; Theages Walker, 1855; Acridopsis Butler, 1876; Galethalea Butler, 1876; Eucereum Zerny, 1912

= Eucereon =

Genus of moths

Eucereon is a genus of tiger moths in the family Erebidae. The genus was erected by Jacob Hübner in 1819.

== Species ==
The genus includes the following species:

- Eucereon abdominalis (Walker, 1855)
- Eucereon aeolum Hampson, 1898
- Eucereon alba (Druce, 1894)
- Eucereon amadis Schaus, 1896
- Eucereon aoris Möschler, 1878
- Eucereon appunctata Dognin, 1891
- Eucereon archias (Stoll, [1790])
- Eucereon aroa Schaus, 1894
- Eucereon atriguttum Druce, 1905
- Eucereon balium Hampson, 1898
- Eucereon casca Dognin, 1894
- Eucereon chalcodon Druce, 1893
- Eucereon cinctum Schaus, 1896
- Eucereon cimonis Schaus, 1910
- Eucereon clementsi Schaus, 1892
- Eucereon coenobita (Möschler, 1886)
- Eucereon complicatum Butler, 1877
- Eucereon confine (Herrich-Schäffer, [1855])
- Eucereon consorta Schaus, 1910
- Eucereon costulata (Herrich-Schäffer, [1855])
- Eucereon darantasia Druce, 1895
- Eucereon davidi (Dognin, 1889)
- Eucereon discolor (Walker, 1856)
- Eucereon erythrolepsis Dyar, 1910
- Eucereon flavicaput Hampson, 1898
- Eucereon guacolda (Poey, 1832)
- Eucereon hoegei Druce, 1884
- Eucereon imriei Druce, 1884
- Eucereon irrorata Schaus, 1904
- Eucereon ladas Schaus, 1892
- Eucereon latifascia Walker, 1856
- Eucereon leria Druce, 1884
- Eucereon leucophaea (Walker, 1855)
- Eucereon lineata (Dognin, 1891)
- Eucereon lutetia Druce, 1884
- Eucereon maia Druce, 1884
- Eucereon marica (Cramer, [1775])
- Eucereon marmoratum Butler, 1877
- Eucereon merula (Dognin, 1891)
- Eucereon metoidesis Hampson, 1905
- Eucereon melanoperas Hampson, 1898
- Eucereon minutum Druce, 1884
- Eucereon moeschleri (Rothschild, 1912)
- Eucereon myrina Druce, 1884
- Eucereon myrtusa Druce, 1884
- Eucereon nebulosum Dognin, 1891
- Eucereon obscura (Möschler, 1872)
- Eucereon ochrota Hampson, 1905
- Eucereon patrona Schaus, 1896
- Eucereon phaeoproctum Hampson, 1898
- Eucereon pica (Walker, 1855)
- Eucereon pilatii Walker, 1854
- Eucereon plumbicollum Hampson, 1898
- Eucereon pometina Druce, 1894
- Eucereon pseudarchias Hampson, 1898
- Eucereon punctata (Guérin-Méneville, [1844])
- Eucereon quadricolor (Walker, 1855)
- Eucereon reniferum Hampson, 1898
- Eucereon rogersi Druce, 1884
- Eucereon rosina (Walker, 1854)
- Eucereon rosa (Walker, 1854)
- Eucereon scyton (Cramer, [1777])
- Eucereon setosa (Sepp, [1830])
- Eucereon striata (Druce, 1889)
- Eucereon sylvius (Stoll, [1790])
- Eucereon tarona Hampson, 1898
- Eucereon tripunctatum Druce, 1884
- Eucereon varia (Walker, 1854)
- Eucereon velutina Schaus, 1896
- Eucereon xanthoperas Hampson, 1898
- Eucereon zamorae Dognin, 1894

=== Former species ===
- Eucereon relegata Schaus, 1911
