= Eucereon abdominalis =

Scientific classification
- Kingdom: Animalia
- Phylum: Arthropoda
- Class: Insecta
- Order: Lepidoptera
- Superfamily: Noctuoidea
- Family: Erebidae
- Subfamily: Arctiinae
- Genus: Eucereon
- Species: E. abdominalis

Binomial name
- Eucereon abdominalis (Walker, 1855)

Synonyms
- Carales abdominalis Walker, 1855

Species of moth

Eucereon abdominalis is a moth of the subfamily Arctiinae. It was described by Francis Walker in 1855. It is found in Venezuela.
