= Eucereon aroa =

Scientific classification
- Domain: Eukaryota
- Kingdom: Animalia
- Phylum: Arthropoda
- Class: Insecta
- Order: Lepidoptera
- Superfamily: Noctuoidea
- Family: Erebidae
- Subfamily: Arctiinae
- Genus: Eucereon
- Species: E. aroa

Binomial name
- Eucereon aroa Schaus, 1894

Species of moth

Eucereon aroa is a moth of the subfamily Arctiinae. It was described by William Schaus in 1894. It is found in Mexico, Guatemala and Venezuela.
