= Eucereon casca =

Scientific classification
- Domain: Eukaryota
- Kingdom: Animalia
- Phylum: Arthropoda
- Class: Insecta
- Order: Lepidoptera
- Superfamily: Noctuoidea
- Family: Erebidae
- Subfamily: Arctiinae
- Genus: Eucereon
- Species: E. casca

Binomial name
- Eucereon casca Dognin, 1894

Species of moth

Eucereon casca is a moth of the subfamily Arctiinae. It was described by Paul Dognin in 1894. It is found in Ecuador and Bolivia.
