= Eucereon irrorata =

Scientific classification
- Kingdom: Animalia
- Phylum: Arthropoda
- Class: Insecta
- Order: Lepidoptera
- Superfamily: Noctuoidea
- Family: Erebidae
- Subfamily: Arctiinae
- Genus: Eucereon
- Species: E. irrorata

Binomial name
- Eucereon irrorata Schaus, 1904

Species of moth

Eucereon irrorata is a moth of the subfamily Arctiinae. It was described by William Schaus in 1904. It is found on Cuba.
