= Eucereon lineata =

Scientific classification
- Kingdom: Animalia
- Phylum: Arthropoda
- Class: Insecta
- Order: Lepidoptera
- Superfamily: Noctuoidea
- Family: Erebidae
- Subfamily: Arctiinae
- Genus: Eucereon
- Species: E. lineata

Binomial name
- Eucereon lineata (Dognin, 1891)

Synonyms
- Theages lineata Dognin, 1891

Species of moth

Eucereon lineata is a moth of the subfamily Arctiinae. It was described by Paul Dognin in 1891. It is found in Ecuador and Bolivia.
