= Eucereon consorta =

Scientific classification
- Domain: Eukaryota
- Kingdom: Animalia
- Phylum: Arthropoda
- Class: Insecta
- Order: Lepidoptera
- Superfamily: Noctuoidea
- Family: Erebidae
- Subfamily: Arctiinae
- Genus: Eucereon
- Species: E. consorta

Binomial name
- Eucereon consorta Schaus, 1910

Species of moth

Eucereon consorta is a moth of the subfamily Arctiinae. It was described by William Schaus in 1910. It is found in Costa Rica and Peru.
