= Eucereon erythrolepsis =

Scientific classification
- Kingdom: Animalia
- Phylum: Arthropoda
- Class: Insecta
- Order: Lepidoptera
- Superfamily: Noctuoidea
- Family: Erebidae
- Subfamily: Arctiinae
- Genus: Eucereon
- Species: E. erythrolepsis

Binomial name
- Eucereon erythrolepsis Dyar, 1910

Species of moth

Eucereon erythrolepsis is a moth of the subfamily Arctiinae. It was described by Harrison Gray Dyar Jr. in 1910. It is found in the US state of Texas, Mexico, Guatemala and Costa Rica.
