= Eucereon marmoratum =

Scientific classification
- Domain: Eukaryota
- Kingdom: Animalia
- Phylum: Arthropoda
- Class: Insecta
- Order: Lepidoptera
- Superfamily: Noctuoidea
- Family: Erebidae
- Subfamily: Arctiinae
- Genus: Eucereon
- Species: E. marmoratum

Binomial name
- Eucereon marmoratum Butler, 1877

Synonyms
- Eucereon flavofasciatum Möschler, 1878

Species of moth

Eucereon marmoratum is a moth of the subfamily Arctiinae. It was described by Arthur Gardiner Butler in 1877. It is found in Suriname and the Amazon region.
