= Eucereon discolor =

Scientific classification
- Kingdom: Animalia
- Phylum: Arthropoda
- Class: Insecta
- Order: Lepidoptera
- Superfamily: Noctuoidea
- Family: Erebidae
- Subfamily: Arctiinae
- Genus: Eucereon
- Species: E. discolor

Binomial name
- Eucereon discolor (Walker, 1856)

Synonyms
- Eucerea discolor Walker, 1856; Eucereon robuba Druce, 1895

Species of moth

Eucereon discolor is a moth of the subfamily Arctiinae. It was described by Francis Walker in 1856. It is found in Panama, Bolivia and São Paulo, Brazil.
