= Eucereon patrona =

Scientific classification
- Domain: Eukaryota
- Kingdom: Animalia
- Phylum: Arthropoda
- Class: Insecta
- Order: Lepidoptera
- Superfamily: Noctuoidea
- Family: Erebidae
- Subfamily: Arctiinae
- Genus: Eucereon
- Species: E. patrona

Binomial name
- Eucereon patrona Schaus, 1896

Species of moth

Eucereon patrona is a moth of the subfamily Arctiinae. It was described by William Schaus in 1896. It is found in Mexico and Venezuela.
