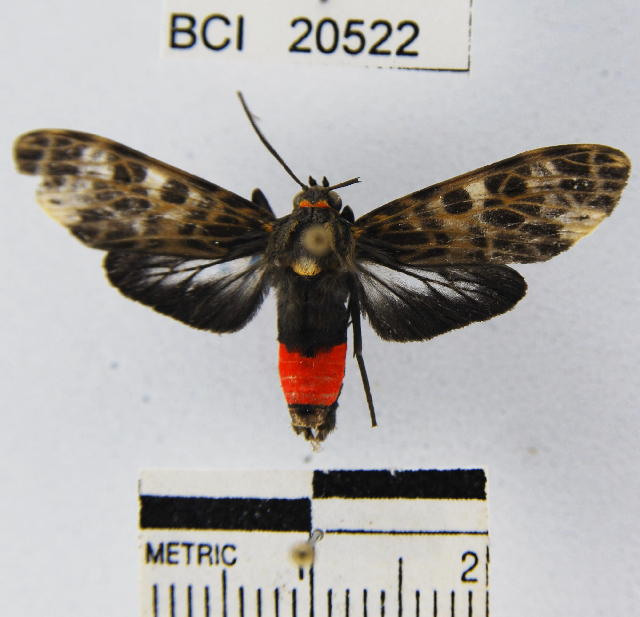

Scientific classification
- Kingdom: Animalia
- Phylum: Arthropoda
- Class: Insecta
- Order: Lepidoptera
- Superfamily: Noctuoidea
- Family: Erebidae
- Subfamily: Arctiinae
- Genus: Eucereon
- Species: E. varia

Binomial name
- Eucereon varia (Walker, 1854)

Synonyms
- Euchromia varia Walker, 1854

= Eucereon varia =

Species of moth

Eucereon varia is a moth of the subfamily Arctiinae. It was described by Francis Walker in 1854. It is found in Pará in Brazil, in Panama and possibly in Colombia.
