= Eucereon xanthoperas =

Scientific classification
- Kingdom: Animalia
- Phylum: Arthropoda
- Class: Insecta
- Order: Lepidoptera
- Superfamily: Noctuoidea
- Family: Erebidae
- Subfamily: Arctiinae
- Genus: Eucereon
- Species: E. xanthoperas

Binomial name
- Eucereon xanthoperas Hampson, 1898

Species of moth

Eucereon xanthoperas is a moth of the subfamily Arctiinae. It was described by George Hampson in 1898. It is found in Mexico, Guatemala and Costa Rica.
