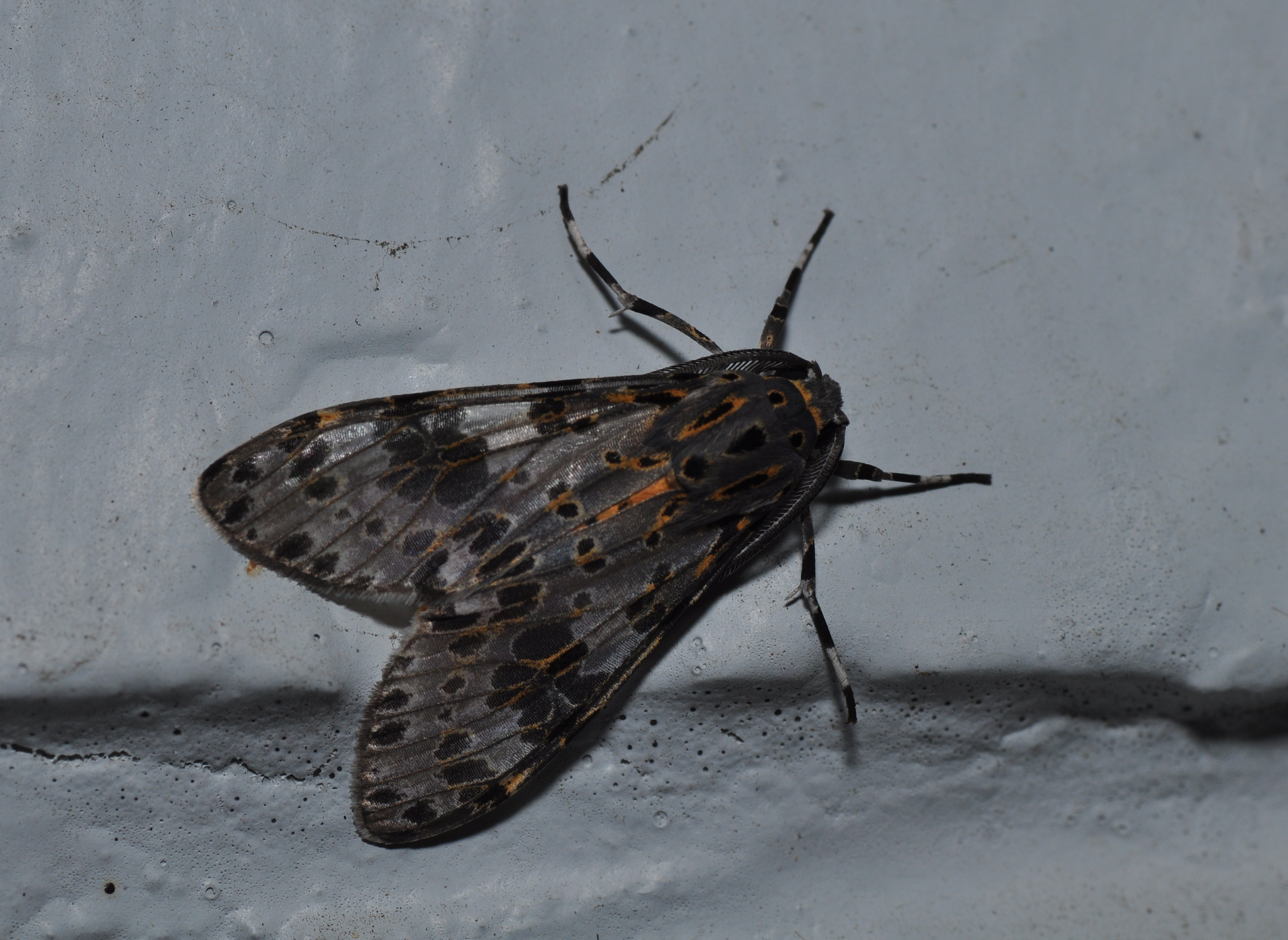

Scientific classification
- Kingdom: Animalia
- Phylum: Arthropoda
- Clade: Pancrustacea
- Class: Insecta
- Order: Lepidoptera
- Superfamily: Noctuoidea
- Family: Erebidae
- Subfamily: Arctiinae
- Genus: Eucereon
- Species: E. myrina

Binomial name
- Eucereon myrina H. Druce, 1884

= Eucereon myrina =

Species of moth

Eucereon myrina is a moth of the subfamily Arctiinae. It was described by Herbert Druce in 1884. It is found in Arizona, Mexico and Guatemala.
