= Eucereon leucophaea =

Scientific classification
- Kingdom: Animalia
- Phylum: Arthropoda
- Class: Insecta
- Order: Lepidoptera
- Superfamily: Noctuoidea
- Family: Erebidae
- Subfamily: Arctiinae
- Genus: Eucereon
- Species: E. leucophaea

Binomial name
- Eucereon leucophaea (Walker, 1855)

Synonyms
- Theages leucophaea Walker, 1855

Species of moth

Eucereon leucophaea is a moth of the subfamily Arctiinae. It was described by Francis Walker in 1855. It is found in the Brazilian states of Rio de Janeiro and São Paulo. Its status is not considered threatened.
