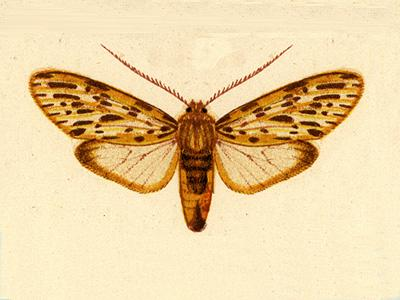

Scientific classification
- Domain: Eukaryota
- Kingdom: Animalia
- Phylum: Arthropoda
- Class: Insecta
- Order: Lepidoptera
- Superfamily: Noctuoidea
- Family: Erebidae
- Subfamily: Arctiinae
- Genus: Eucereon
- Species: E. moeschleri

Binomial name
- Eucereon moeschleri (Rothschild, 1912)

Synonyms
- Eucereum moeschleri Rothschild, 1912

= Eucereon moeschleri =

Species of moth

Eucereon moeschleri is a moth of the subfamily Arctiinae first described by Rothschild in 1912. It is found on Jamaica.
