= Eucereon aoris =

Scientific classification
- Domain: Eukaryota
- Kingdom: Animalia
- Phylum: Arthropoda
- Class: Insecta
- Order: Lepidoptera
- Superfamily: Noctuoidea
- Family: Erebidae
- Subfamily: Arctiinae
- Genus: Eucereon
- Species: E. aoris

Binomial name
- Eucereon aoris Möschler, 1878

Species of moth

Eucereon aoris is a moth of the subfamily Arctiinae. It was described by Heinrich Benno Möschler in 1878. It is found in Suriname.
