= Prosopidia morosa =

Scientific classification
- Domain: Eukaryota
- Kingdom: Animalia
- Phylum: Arthropoda
- Class: Insecta
- Order: Lepidoptera
- Superfamily: Noctuoidea
- Family: Erebidae
- Subfamily: Arctiinae
- Genus: Prosopidia
- Species: P. morosa

Binomial name
- Prosopidia morosa Schaus, 1910

Synonyms
- Prosopidia morosa f. atypica Bryk, 1953

Species of moth

Prosopidia morosa is a moth in the subfamily Arctiinae. It was described by William Schaus in 1910. It is found in Costa Rica.
