= Eucereon striata =

Scientific classification
- Domain: Eukaryota
- Kingdom: Animalia
- Phylum: Arthropoda
- Class: Insecta
- Order: Lepidoptera
- Superfamily: Noctuoidea
- Family: Erebidae
- Subfamily: Arctiinae
- Genus: Eucereon
- Species: E. striata

Binomial name
- Eucereon striata (H. Druce, 1889)

Synonyms
- Theages striata H. Druce, 1889

Species of moth

Eucereon striata is a moth of the subfamily Arctiinae. It was described by Herbert Druce in 1889. It is found in Mexico, Costa Rica and Rio de Janeiro, Brazil.
