= Eucereon nebulosum =

Scientific classification
- Kingdom: Animalia
- Phylum: Arthropoda
- Class: Insecta
- Order: Lepidoptera
- Superfamily: Noctuoidea
- Family: Erebidae
- Subfamily: Arctiinae
- Genus: Eucereon
- Species: E. nebulosum

Binomial name
- Eucereon nebulosum Dognin, 1891

Species of moth

Eucereon nebulosum is a moth of the subfamily Arctiinae. It was described by Paul Dognin in 1891. It is found in Ecuador.
