= Eucereon quadricolor =

Scientific classification
- Kingdom: Animalia
- Phylum: Arthropoda
- Class: Insecta
- Order: Lepidoptera
- Superfamily: Noctuoidea
- Family: Erebidae
- Subfamily: Arctiinae
- Genus: Eucereon
- Species: E. quadricolor

Binomial name
- Eucereon quadricolor (Walker, 1855)

Synonyms
- Theages quadricolor Walker, 1855

Species of moth

Eucereon quadricolor is a moth of the subfamily Arctiinae. It was described by Francis Walker in 1855 and is found in Mexico, Costa Rica, Panama and Rio de Janeiro (Brazil).
