= Prosopidia meruloides =

Scientific classification
- Domain: Eukaryota
- Kingdom: Animalia
- Phylum: Arthropoda
- Class: Insecta
- Order: Lepidoptera
- Superfamily: Noctuoidea
- Family: Erebidae
- Subfamily: Arctiinae
- Genus: Prosopidia
- Species: P. meruloides

Binomial name
- Prosopidia meruloides Schaus, 1905

Species of moth

Prosopidia meruloides is a moth in the subfamily Arctiinae. It was described by William Schaus in 1905. It is found in Peru.
