= Eucereon balium =

Scientific classification
- Kingdom: Animalia
- Phylum: Arthropoda
- Class: Insecta
- Order: Lepidoptera
- Superfamily: Noctuoidea
- Family: Erebidae
- Subfamily: Arctiinae
- Genus: Eucereon
- Species: E. balium

Binomial name
- Eucereon balium Hampson, 1898

Synonyms
- Heliura balium (Hampson, 1898)

Species of moth

Eucereon balium is a moth of the subfamily Arctiinae. It was described by George Hampson in 1898. It is found in Honduras.
