= Eucereon cimonis =

Scientific classification
- Domain: Eukaryota
- Kingdom: Animalia
- Phylum: Arthropoda
- Class: Insecta
- Order: Lepidoptera
- Superfamily: Noctuoidea
- Family: Erebidae
- Subfamily: Arctiinae
- Genus: Eucereon
- Species: E. cimonis

Binomial name
- Eucereon cimonis Schaus, 1910

Species of moth

Eucereon cimonis is a moth of the subfamily Arctiinae. It was described by William Schaus in 1910. It is found in Costa Rica, Venezuela, Ecuador and Peru.
