= Eucereon cinctum =

Scientific classification
- Domain: Eukaryota
- Kingdom: Animalia
- Phylum: Arthropoda
- Class: Insecta
- Order: Lepidoptera
- Superfamily: Noctuoidea
- Family: Erebidae
- Subfamily: Arctiinae
- Genus: Eucereon
- Species: E. cinctum

Binomial name
- Eucereon cinctum Schaus, 1896

Synonyms
- Eucereon latifascia Butler, 1876

Species of moth

Eucereon cinctum is a moth of the subfamily Arctiinae. It was described by William Schaus in 1896. It is found in Trinidad and Pará, Brazil.
