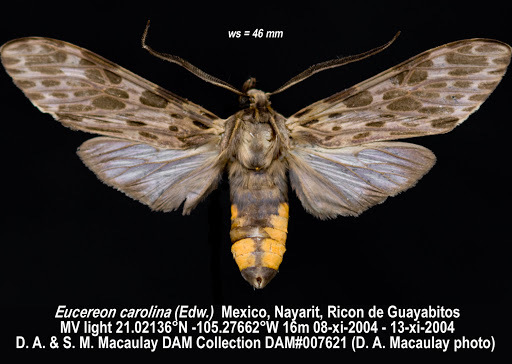

Scientific classification
- Domain: Eukaryota
- Kingdom: Animalia
- Phylum: Arthropoda
- Class: Insecta
- Order: Lepidoptera
- Superfamily: Noctuoidea
- Family: Erebidae
- Subfamily: Arctiinae
- Genus: Nelphe
- Species: N. carolina

Binomial name
- Nelphe carolina H. Edwards, 1887

Synonyms
- Eucereon cubensis Schaus, 1904; Eucereon confusum Rothschild, 1912

= Nelphe carolina =

Species of moth

Nelphe carolina, the Florida eucereon or little Carol's wasp moth, is a species of moth in the subfamily Arctiinae. The species was first described by Henry Edwards in 1887. It is found in southern Texas, Florida, Mexico and Cuba.

The wingspan is 31–34 mm (1.2–1.3 in). Adults have been recorded on wing year round.

The larvae feed on Cynanchum species.
