= Eucereon imriei =

Scientific classification
- Domain: Eukaryota
- Kingdom: Animalia
- Phylum: Arthropoda
- Class: Insecta
- Order: Lepidoptera
- Superfamily: Noctuoidea
- Family: Erebidae
- Subfamily: Arctiinae
- Genus: Eucereon
- Species: E. imriei

Binomial name
- Eucereon imriei H. Druce, 1884

Species of moth

Eucereon imriei is a moth of the subfamily Arctiinae. It was described by Herbert Druce in 1884. It is found on Guadeloupe, Dominica, Montserrat and Saint Kitts.
