= Eucereon costulata =

Scientific classification
- Domain: Eukaryota
- Kingdom: Animalia
- Phylum: Arthropoda
- Class: Insecta
- Order: Lepidoptera
- Superfamily: Noctuoidea
- Family: Erebidae
- Subfamily: Arctiinae
- Genus: Eucereon
- Species: E. costulata

Binomial name
- Eucereon costulata (Herrich-Schäffer, [1855])

Synonyms
- Charidea costulata Herrich-Schäffer, [1855]

Species of moth

Eucereon costulata is a moth of the subfamily Arctiinae. It was described by Gottlieb August Wilhelm Herrich-Schäffer in 1855. It is found in Panama and Venezuela.
