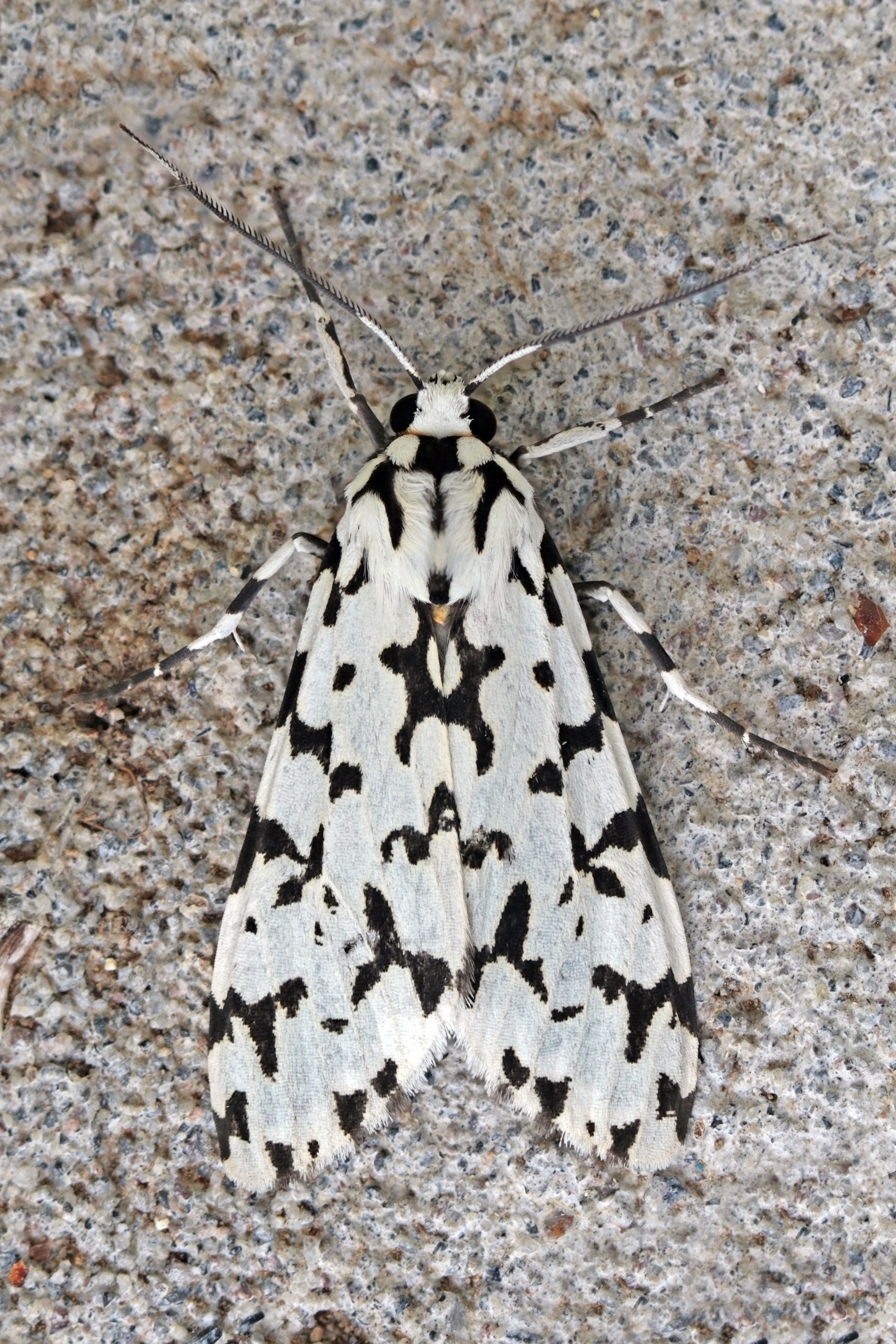
- Eucereon pica tigrata Mount Totumas cloud forest, Panama

Scientific classification
- Kingdom: Animalia
- Phylum: Arthropoda
- Class: Insecta
- Order: Lepidoptera
- Superfamily: Noctuoidea
- Family: Erebidae
- Subfamily: Arctiinae
- Genus: Eucereon
- Species: E. pica

Binomial name
- Eucereon pica (Walker, 1855)

Synonyms
- Halesidota pica Walker, 1855; Charidea tigrata Herrich-Schäffer, [1855]; Brycea peruviana Schaus, 1892

= Eucereon pica =

Species of moth

Eucereon pica is a moth of the subfamily Arctiinae, described by Francis Walker in 1855. It is found in Costa Rica, Peru and Rio de Janeiro, Brazil.

== Subspecies ==
- Eucereon pica pica (Brazil: Rio de Janeiro)
- Eucereon pica tigrata (Herrich-Schäffer, [1855]) (Costa Rica, Peru)
