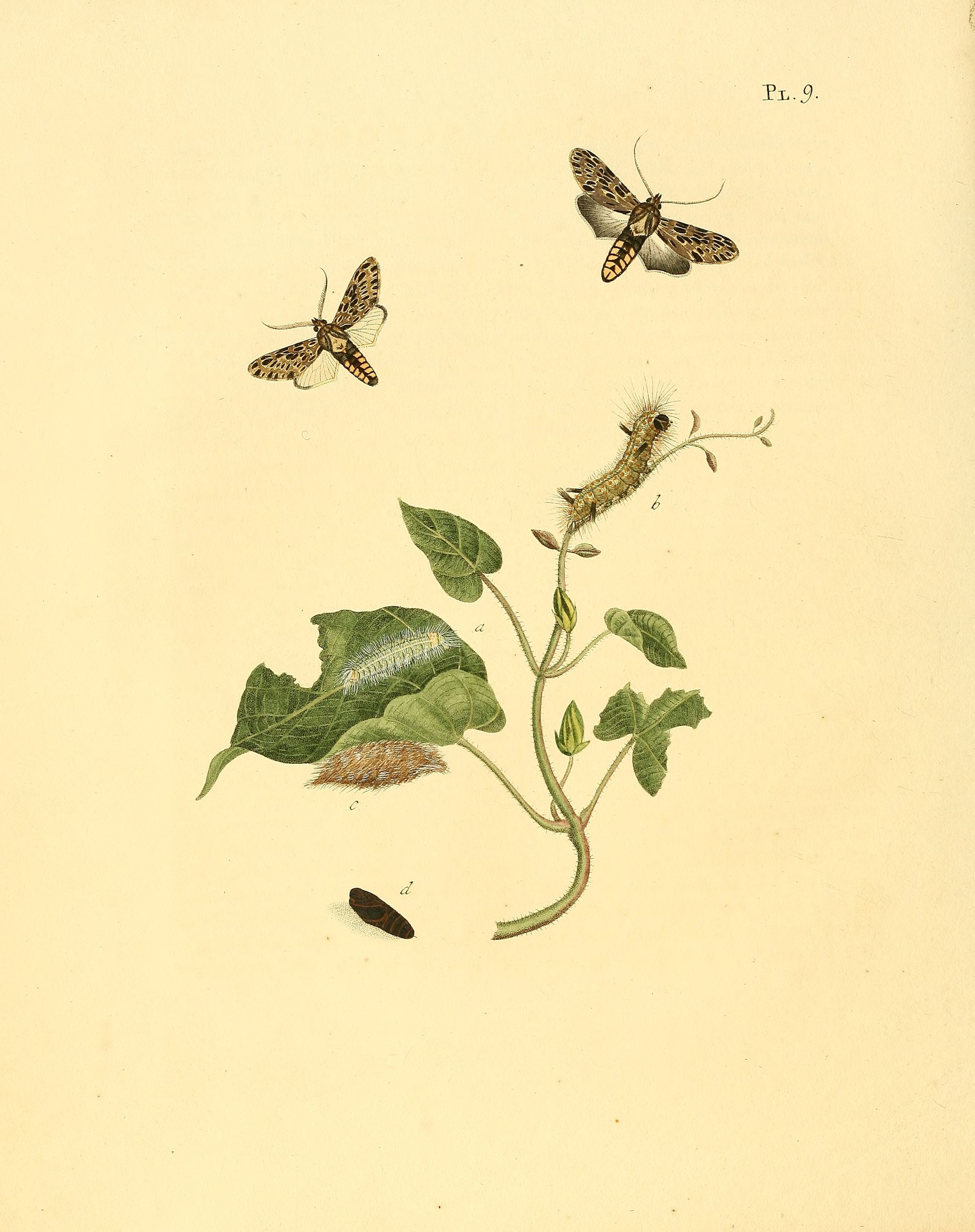

Scientific classification
- Domain: Eukaryota
- Kingdom: Animalia
- Phylum: Arthropoda
- Class: Insecta
- Order: Lepidoptera
- Superfamily: Noctuoidea
- Family: Erebidae
- Subfamily: Arctiinae
- Genus: Eucereon
- Species: E. setosa

Binomial name
- Eucereon setosa (Sepp, [1830])

Synonyms
- Phalaena setosa Sepp, [1830]

= Eucereon setosa =

Species of moth

Eucereon setosa is a moth of the subfamily Arctiinae. It was described by Sepp in 1830. It is found in Mexico, Guatemala, Panama, Venezuela, Suriname and Bahia, Brazil.
