= Eucereon punctata =

Scientific classification
- Kingdom: Animalia
- Phylum: Arthropoda
- Clade: Pancrustacea
- Class: Insecta
- Order: Lepidoptera
- Superfamily: Noctuoidea
- Family: Erebidae
- Subfamily: Arctiinae
- Genus: Eucereon
- Species: E. punctata

Binomial name
- Eucereon punctata (Guérin-Méneville, [1844])

Synonyms
- Chelonia punctata Guérin-Méneville, [1844]; Eucerea mitigata Walker, 1856; Eucereon cribrum Möschler, 1878; Eucereon reticulatum Butler, 1877

Species of moth

Eucereon punctata is a moth of the subfamily Arctiinae. It was described by Félix Édouard Guérin-Méneville in 1844. It is found in Guatemala, Suriname and the Amazon region.
