= Eucereon rogersi =

Scientific classification
- Domain: Eukaryota
- Kingdom: Animalia
- Phylum: Arthropoda
- Class: Insecta
- Order: Lepidoptera
- Superfamily: Noctuoidea
- Family: Erebidae
- Subfamily: Arctiinae
- Genus: Eucereon
- Species: E. rogersi

Binomial name
- Eucereon rogersi H. Druce, 1884

Species of moth

Eucereon rogersi is a moth of the subfamily Arctiinae. It was described by Herbert Druce in 1884. It is found in Costa Rica, Panama, as well as on Guadeloupe and Saint Kitts.
