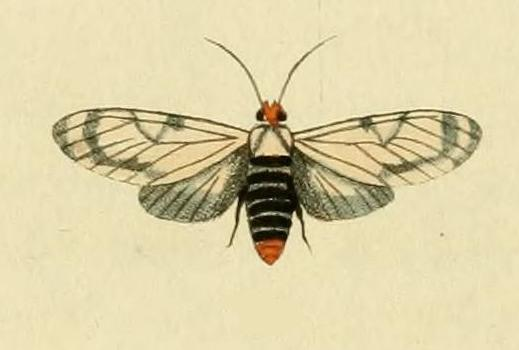

Scientific classification
- Kingdom: Animalia
- Phylum: Arthropoda
- Class: Insecta
- Order: Lepidoptera
- Superfamily: Noctuoidea
- Family: Erebidae
- Subfamily: Arctiinae
- Genus: Eucereon
- Species: E. scyton

Binomial name
- Eucereon scyton (Cramer, [1777])

Synonyms
- Sphinx scyton Cramer, [1777]

= Eucereon scyton =

Species of moth

Eucereon scyton is a moth of the subfamily Arctiinae first described by Pieter Cramer in 1777. It is found in Suriname and São Paulo, Brazil.
