= Nelphe =

Scientific classification
- Domain: Eukaryota
- Kingdom: Animalia
- Phylum: Arthropoda
- Class: Insecta
- Order: Lepidoptera
- Superfamily: Noctuoidea
- Family: Erebidae
- Subfamily: Arctiinae
- Tribe: Arctiini
- Subtribe: Euchromiina
- Genus: Nelphe; Herrich-Schäffer, [1858]

Genus of moths

Nelphe is a genus of tiger moths in the family Erebidae. The genus was erected by Gottlieb August Wilhelm Herrich-Schäffer in 1858.

== Species ==
- Nelphe carolina (H. Edwards, 1886) – Little Carol's wasp moth
- Nelphe relegatum (Schaus, 1911)
