= Eucereon alba =

Scientific classification
- Domain: Eukaryota
- Kingdom: Animalia
- Phylum: Arthropoda
- Class: Insecta
- Order: Lepidoptera
- Superfamily: Noctuoidea
- Family: Erebidae
- Subfamily: Arctiinae
- Genus: Eucereon
- Species: E. alba

Binomial name
- Eucereon alba (H. Druce, 1894)

Synonyms
- Idalus alba H. Druce, 1894; Hyaleucerea agylloides Dyar, 1912

Species of moth

Eucereon alba is a moth of the subfamily Arctiinae. It was described by Herbert Druce in 1894. It is found in Mexico.
