= Eucereon sylvius =

Scientific classification
- Kingdom: Animalia
- Phylum: Arthropoda
- Class: Insecta
- Order: Lepidoptera
- Superfamily: Noctuoidea
- Family: Erebidae
- Subfamily: Arctiinae
- Genus: Eucereon
- Species: E. sylvius

Binomial name
- Eucereon sylvius (Stoll, [1790])

Synonyms
- Sphinx sylvius Stoll, [1790]; Eucereon lutulentum Möschler, 1878

Species of moth

Eucereon sylvius is a moth of the subfamily Arctiinae. It was described by Caspar Stoll in 1790. It is found in Suriname and the Amazon region.
