= Eucereon chalcodon =

Scientific classification
- Domain: Eukaryota
- Kingdom: Animalia
- Phylum: Arthropoda
- Class: Insecta
- Order: Lepidoptera
- Superfamily: Noctuoidea
- Family: Erebidae
- Subfamily: Arctiinae
- Genus: Eucereon
- Species: E. chalcodon

Binomial name
- Eucereon chalcodon H. Druce, 1893

Species of moth

Eucereon chalcodon is a moth of the subfamily Arctiinae. It was described by Herbert Druce in 1893. It is found in the Brazilian states of São Paulo and Rio de Janeiro.
