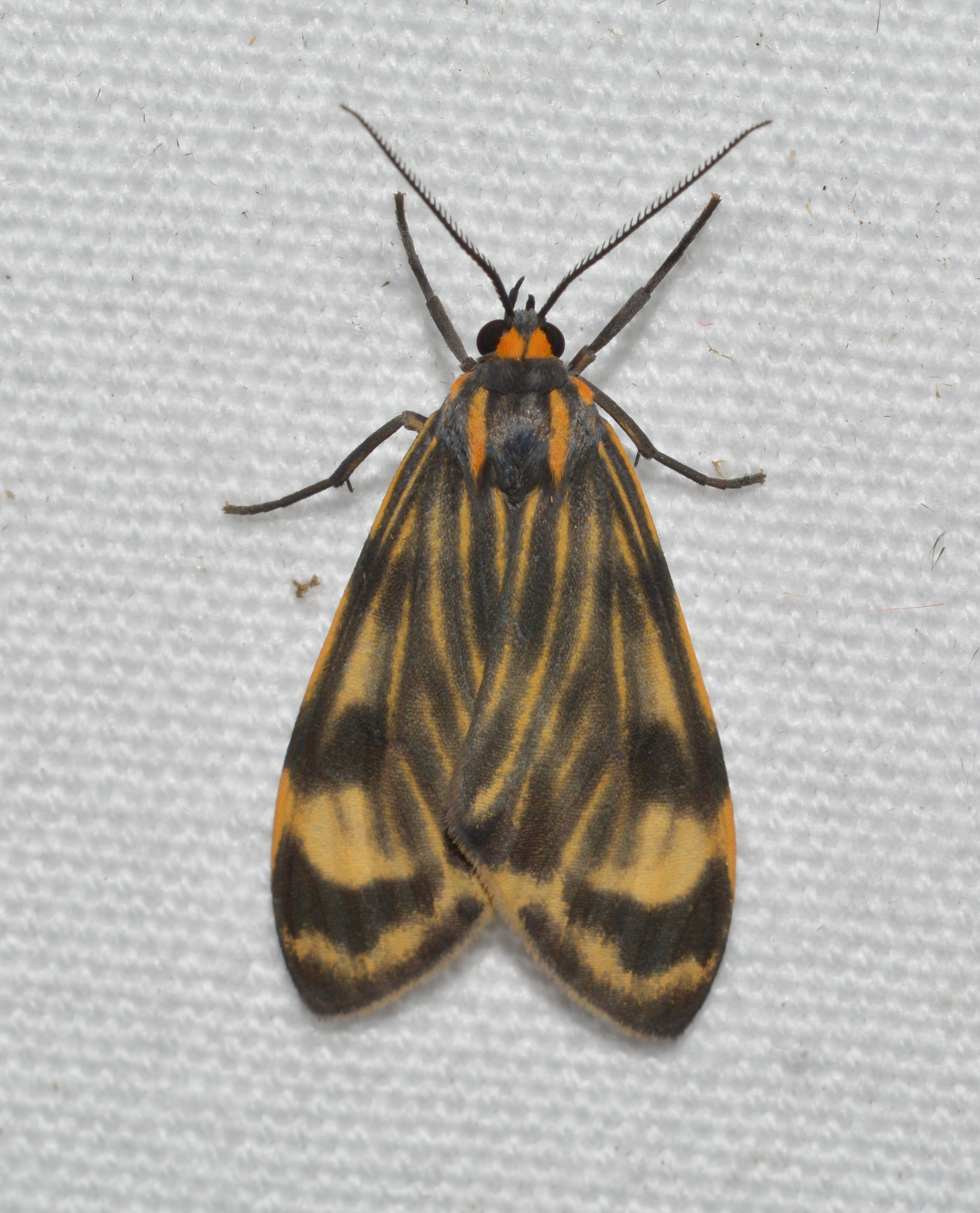

Scientific classification
- Kingdom: Animalia
- Phylum: Arthropoda
- Class: Insecta
- Order: Lepidoptera
- Superfamily: Noctuoidea
- Family: Erebidae
- Subfamily: Arctiinae
- Genus: Eucereon
- Species: E. phaeoproctum

Binomial name
- Eucereon phaeoproctum Hampson, 1898

= Eucereon phaeoproctum =

Species of moth

Eucereon phaeoproctum is a moth of the subfamily Arctiinae. It was described by George Hampson in 1898. It is found in Guatemala, Costa Rica and Panama.
