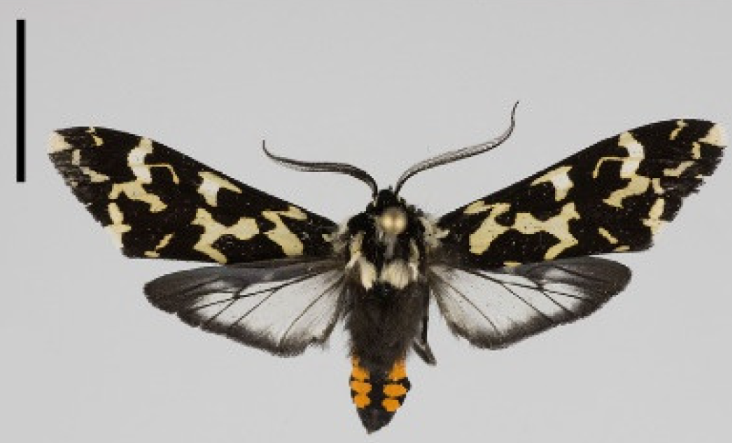
- Galethalea davidi, from the Ecuadorean Andes, with aposematic coloration. Scale bar 1cm

Scientific classification
- Domain: Eukaryota
- Kingdom: Animalia
- Phylum: Arthropoda
- Class: Insecta
- Order: Lepidoptera
- Superfamily: Noctuoidea
- Family: Erebidae
- Subfamily: Arctiinae
- Genus: Eucereon
- Species: E. davidi

Binomial name
- Eucereon davidi (Dognin, 1889)

Synonyms
- Galethalea davidi Dognin, 1889

= Eucereon davidi =

Species of moth

Eucereon davidi is a moth of the subfamily Arctiinae. It was described by Paul Dognin in 1889. It is found in Ecuador, Bolivia, Colombia and Peru.
