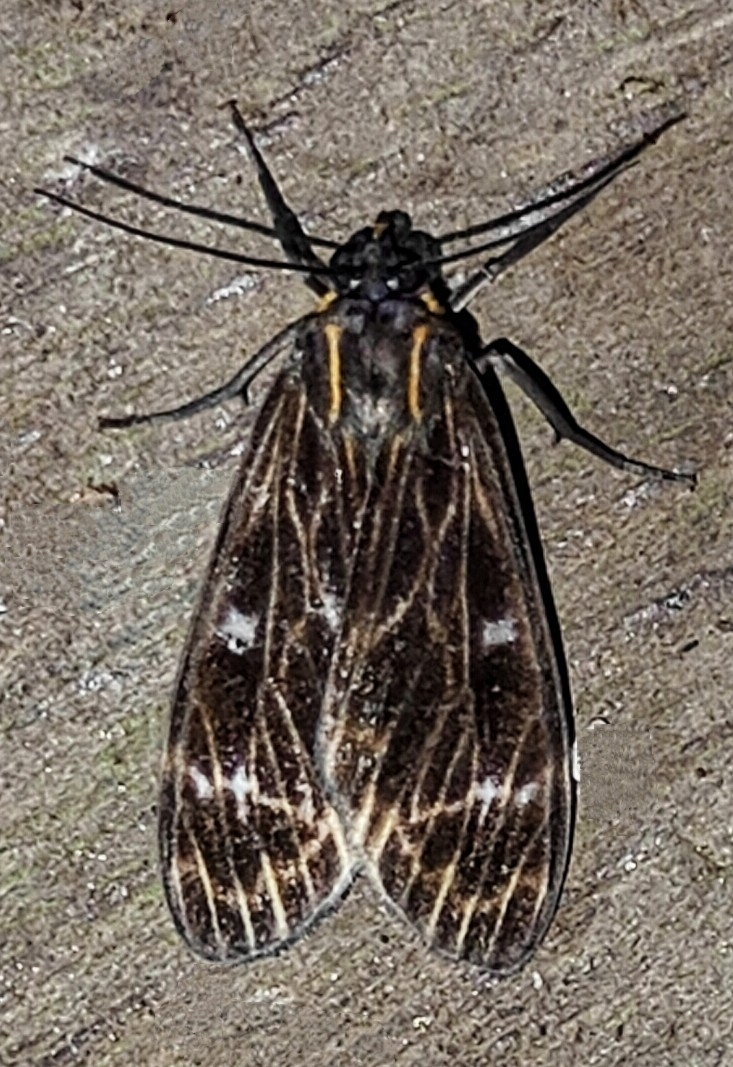

Scientific classification
- Kingdom: Animalia
- Phylum: Arthropoda
- Clade: Pancrustacea
- Class: Insecta
- Order: Lepidoptera
- Superfamily: Noctuoidea
- Family: Erebidae
- Subfamily: Arctiinae
- Genus: Eucereon
- Species: E. darantasia

Binomial name
- Eucereon darantasia H. Druce, 1895

= Eucereon darantasia =

Species of moth

Eucereon darantasia is a species of moth in the subfamily Arctiinae. It was first described by Herbert Druce in 1895. It is found in Costa Rica.
