= Eucereon confine =

Scientific classification
- Domain: Eukaryota
- Kingdom: Animalia
- Phylum: Arthropoda
- Class: Insecta
- Order: Lepidoptera
- Superfamily: Noctuoidea
- Family: Erebidae
- Subfamily: Arctiinae
- Genus: Eucereon
- Species: E. confine

Binomial name
- Eucereon confine (Herrich-Schäffer, [1855])

Synonyms
- Charidea confine Herrich-Schäffer, [1855]; Charidea confinis Herrich-Schäffer, [1855]; Nelphe confinis (Herrich-Schäffer, [1855])

Species of moth

Eucereon confine is a moth of the subfamily Arctiinae. It was described by Gottlieb August Wilhelm Herrich-Schäffer in 1855. It is found in Florida, Mexico, Guatemala and Costa Rica.
