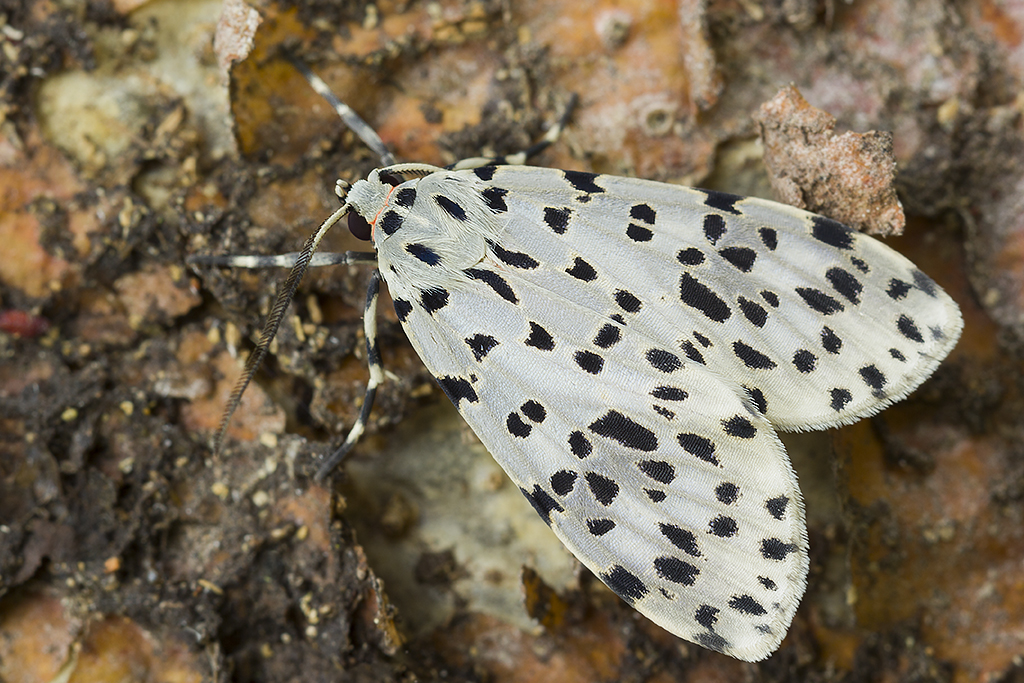

Scientific classification
- Domain: Eukaryota
- Kingdom: Animalia
- Phylum: Arthropoda
- Class: Insecta
- Order: Lepidoptera
- Superfamily: Noctuoidea
- Family: Erebidae
- Subfamily: Arctiinae
- Genus: Eucereon
- Species: E. atriguttum

Binomial name
- Eucereon atriguttum H. Druce, 1905

Synonyms
- Eucereon atrigutta

= Eucereon atriguttum =

Species of moth

Eucereon atriguttum is a moth of the subfamily Arctiinae. It was described by Herbert Druce in 1905. It is found in Venezuela and Honduras.
