= Eucereon lutetia =

Scientific classification
- Domain: Eukaryota
- Kingdom: Animalia
- Phylum: Arthropoda
- Class: Insecta
- Order: Lepidoptera
- Superfamily: Noctuoidea
- Family: Erebidae
- Subfamily: Arctiinae
- Genus: Eucereon
- Species: E. lutetia

Binomial name
- Eucereon lutetia H. Druce, 1884

Species of moth

Eucereon lutetia is a moth of the subfamily Arctiinae. It was described by Herbert Druce in 1884. It is found in Panama.
