= Eucereon rosina =

Scientific classification
- Kingdom: Animalia
- Phylum: Arthropoda
- Class: Insecta
- Order: Lepidoptera
- Superfamily: Noctuoidea
- Family: Erebidae
- Subfamily: Arctiinae
- Genus: Eucereon
- Species: E. rosina

Binomial name
- Eucereon rosina (Walker, 1854)

Synonyms
- Euchromia rosina Walker, 1854; Carales imprimata Walker, [1865]

Species of moth

Eucereon rosina is a moth of the subfamily Arctiinae. It was described by Francis Walker in 1854. It is found in Mexico, Venezuela, Trinidad and Rio de Janeiro, Brazil.
