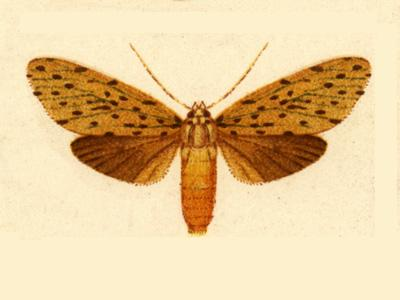

Scientific classification
- Kingdom: Animalia
- Phylum: Arthropoda
- Class: Insecta
- Order: Lepidoptera
- Superfamily: Noctuoidea
- Family: Erebidae
- Subfamily: Arctiinae
- Genus: Eucereon
- Species: E. ochrota

Binomial name
- Eucereon ochrota Hampson, 1905

= Eucereon ochrota =

Species of moth

Eucereon ochrota is a moth of the subfamily Arctiinae first described by George Hampson in 1905. It is found on Jamaica.
