= Eucereon reniferum =

Scientific classification
- Kingdom: Animalia
- Phylum: Arthropoda
- Class: Insecta
- Order: Lepidoptera
- Superfamily: Noctuoidea
- Family: Erebidae
- Subfamily: Arctiinae
- Tribe: Arctiini
- Subtribe: Ctenuchina
- Genus: Eucereon
- Species: E. reniferum

Binomial name
- Eucereon reniferum Hampson, 1898

Species of moth

Eucereon reniferum is a moth in the subfamily Arctiinae. It was described by George Hampson in 1898. It is found in the Amazon region.
