= Eucereon coenobita =

Scientific classification
- Domain: Eukaryota
- Kingdom: Animalia
- Phylum: Arthropoda
- Class: Insecta
- Order: Lepidoptera
- Superfamily: Noctuoidea
- Family: Erebidae
- Subfamily: Arctiinae
- Genus: Eucereon
- Species: E. coenobita

Binomial name
- Eucereon coenobita (Möschler, 1886)

Synonyms
- Galethalia coenobita Möschler, 1886

Species of moth

Eucereon coenobita is a moth of the subfamily Arctiinae. It was described by Heinrich Benno Möschler in 1886. It is found on Jamaica.
