= Eucereon obscura =

Scientific classification
- Domain: Eukaryota
- Kingdom: Animalia
- Phylum: Arthropoda
- Class: Insecta
- Order: Lepidoptera
- Superfamily: Noctuoidea
- Family: Erebidae
- Subfamily: Arctiinae
- Genus: Eucereon
- Species: E. obscura

Binomial name
- Eucereon obscura (Möschler, 1872)

Synonyms
- Aclytia obscura Möschler, 1872; Epanycles stellifera Butler, 1877

Species of moth

Eucereon obscura is a moth of the subfamily Arctiinae. It was described by Heinrich Benno Möschler in 1872. It is found in Mexico, Costa Rica, Panama, Ecuador and the Amazon region.
