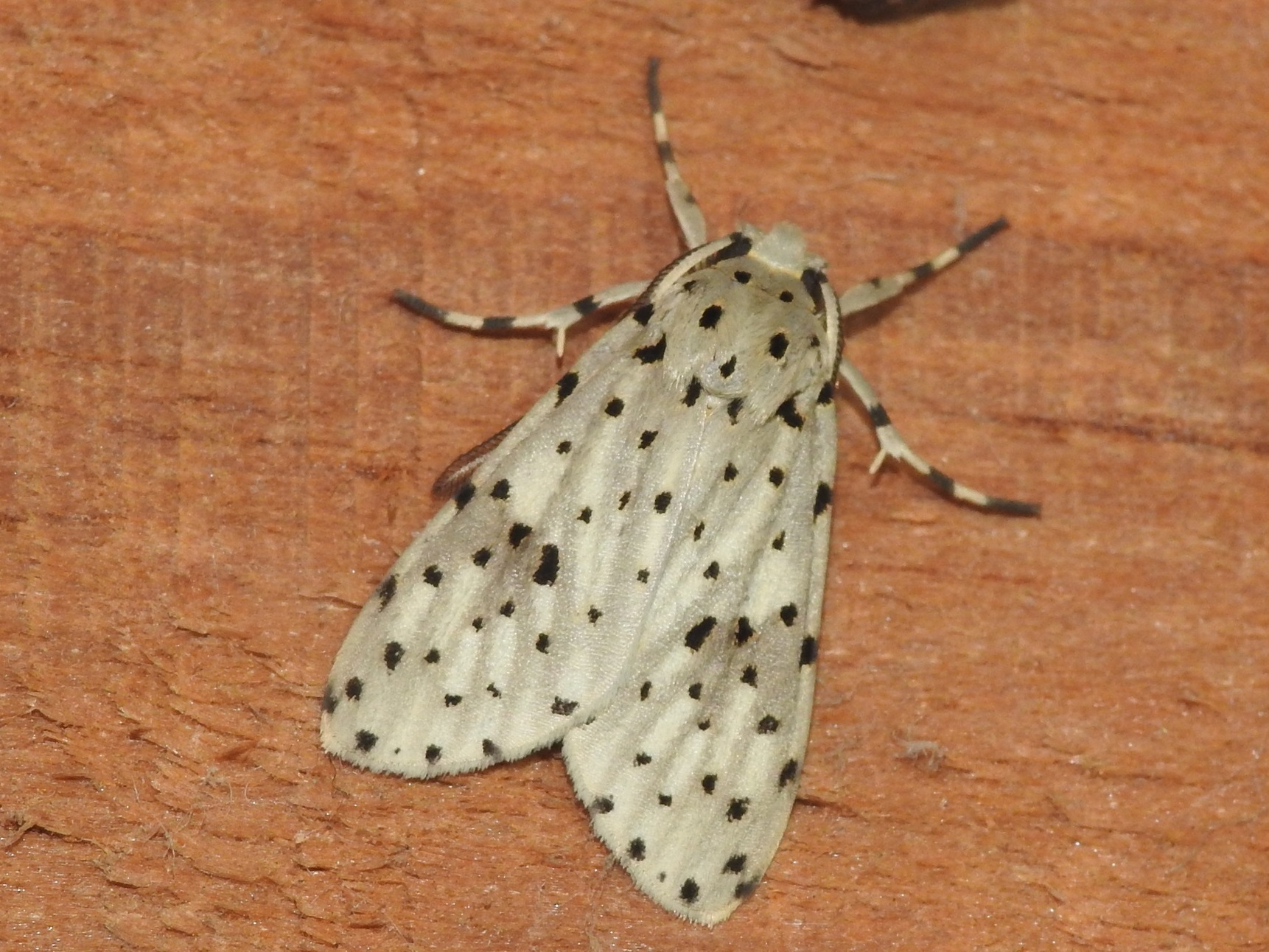
- Dominican Republic

Scientific classification
- Kingdom: Animalia
- Phylum: Arthropoda
- Class: Insecta
- Order: Lepidoptera
- Superfamily: Noctuoidea
- Family: Erebidae
- Subfamily: Arctiinae
- Genus: Eucereon
- Species: E. guacolda

Binomial name
- Eucereon guacolda (Poey, 1832)

Synonyms
- Erithales guacolda Poey, 1832

= Eucereon guacolda =

Species of moth

Eucereon guacolda is a moth of the subfamily Arctiinae. It was described by Poey in 1832. It is found on Cuba and Hispaniola.
