= Eucereon minutum =

Scientific classification
- Domain: Eukaryota
- Kingdom: Animalia
- Phylum: Arthropoda
- Class: Insecta
- Order: Lepidoptera
- Superfamily: Noctuoidea
- Family: Erebidae
- Subfamily: Arctiinae
- Genus: Eucereon
- Species: E. minutum

Binomial name
- Eucereon minutum H. Druce, 1884

Synonyms
- Eucereon drucei Kirby, 1892

Species of moth

Eucereon minutum is a moth of the subfamily Arctiinae. It was described by Herbert Druce in 1884. It is found in Panama.
