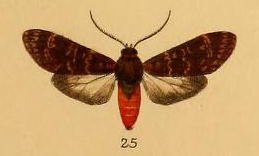
- Eucereon clementsi

Scientific classification
- Domain: Eukaryota
- Kingdom: Animalia
- Phylum: Arthropoda
- Class: Insecta
- Order: Lepidoptera
- Superfamily: Noctuoidea
- Family: Erebidae
- Subfamily: Arctiinae
- Genus: Eucereon
- Species: E. clementsi

Binomial name
- Eucereon clementsi Schaus, 1892

= Eucereon clementsi =

Species of moth

Eucereon clementsi is a moth of the subfamily Arctiinae. It was described by William Schaus in 1892. It is found on St. Lucia in the West Indies.
