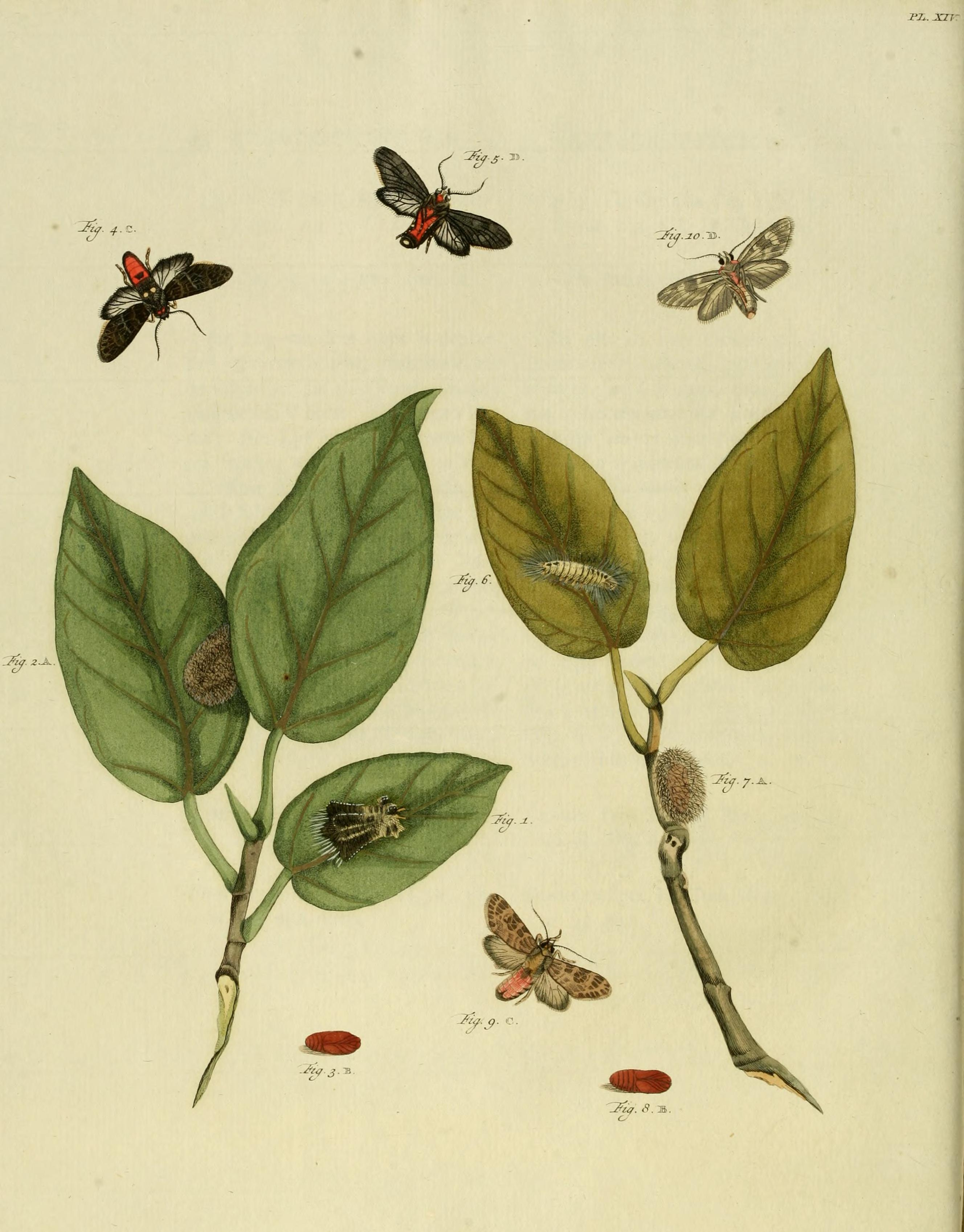
- Stages of Eucereon archias (figures 6-9, right)

Scientific classification
- Domain: Eukaryota
- Kingdom: Animalia
- Phylum: Arthropoda
- Class: Insecta
- Order: Lepidoptera
- Superfamily: Noctuoidea
- Family: Erebidae
- Subfamily: Arctiinae
- Genus: Eucereon
- Species: E. archias

Binomial name
- Eucereon archias (Stoll, [1790])

Synonyms
- Sphinx archias Stoll, [1790]

= Eucereon archias =

Species of moth

Eucereon archias is a moth of the subfamily Arctiinae. It was described by Stoll in 1790. It is found in Suriname.
