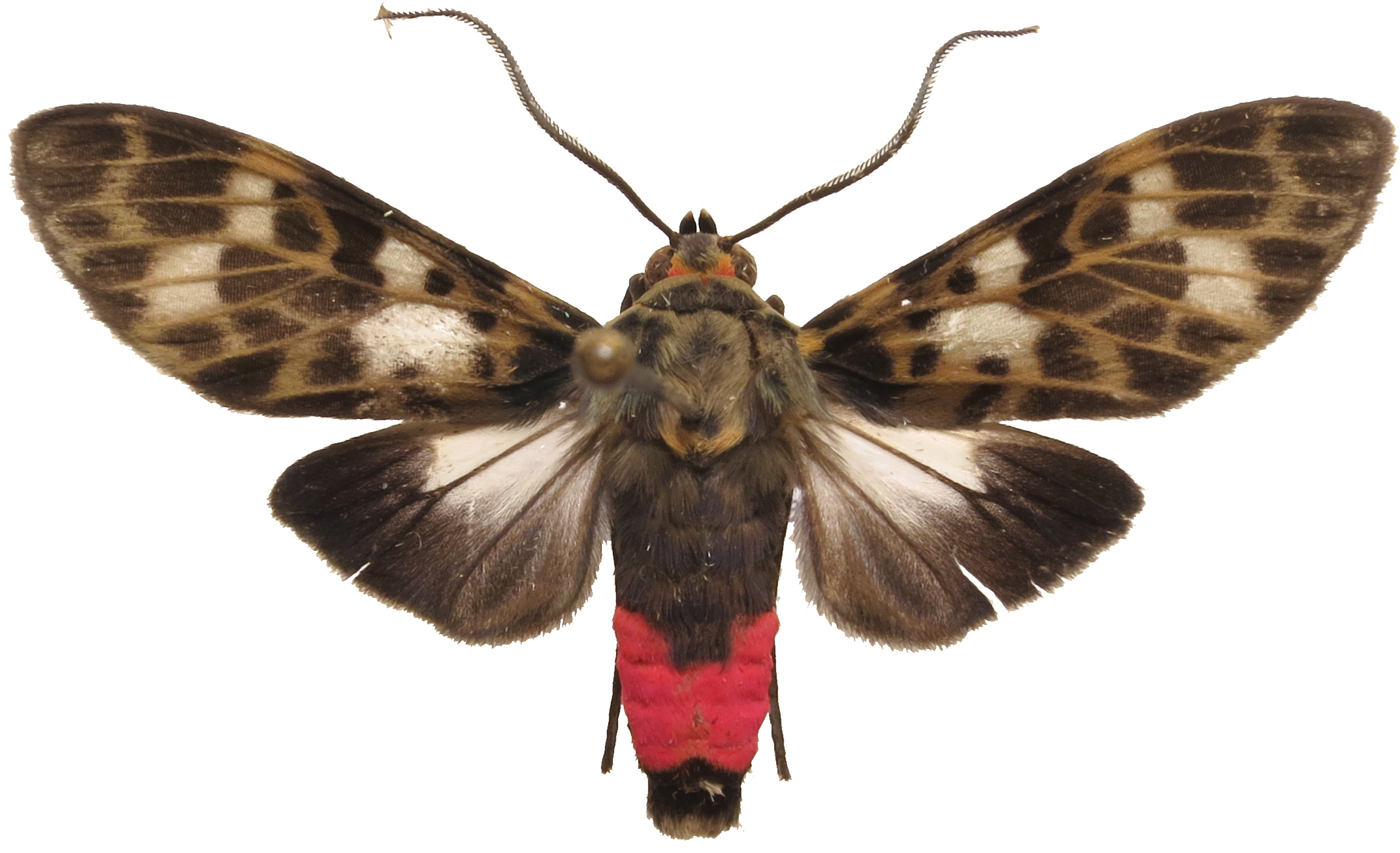
- Eucereon metoidesis - French Guiana

Scientific classification
- Kingdom: Animalia
- Phylum: Arthropoda
- Clade: Pancrustacea
- Class: Insecta
- Order: Lepidoptera
- Superfamily: Noctuoidea
- Family: Erebidae
- Subfamily: Arctiinae
- Genus: Eucereon
- Species: E. metoidesis

Binomial name
- Eucereon metoidesis Hampson, 1905

Synonyms
- Eucereon metoedesis Zerny, 1912; Eucereon metoidesis romani Bryk, 1953; Eucereon theophanes Schaus, 1924

= Eucereon metoidesis =

Species of moth

Eucereon metoidesis is a moth of the subfamily Arctiinae. It is found in Brazil and Guyana.
