= Eucereon zamorae =

Scientific classification
- Domain: Eukaryota
- Kingdom: Animalia
- Phylum: Arthropoda
- Class: Insecta
- Order: Lepidoptera
- Superfamily: Noctuoidea
- Family: Erebidae
- Subfamily: Arctiinae
- Genus: Eucereon
- Species: E. zamorae

Binomial name
- Eucereon zamorae Dognin, 1894

Species of moth

Eucereon zamorae is a moth of the subfamily Arctiinae. It was described by Paul Dognin in 1894. It is found in Ecuador and Peru.
