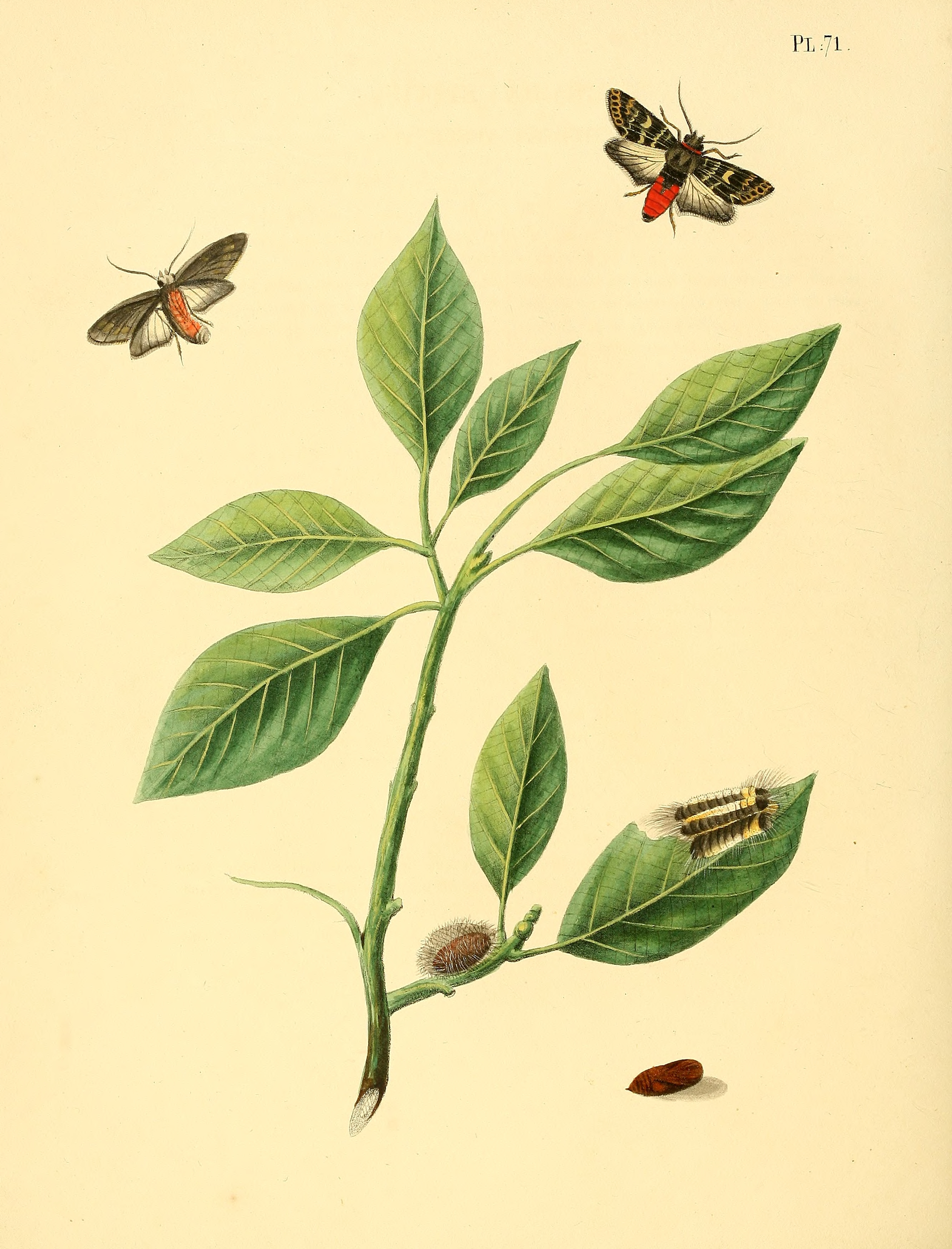

Scientific classification
- Kingdom: Animalia
- Phylum: Arthropoda
- Clade: Pancrustacea
- Class: Insecta
- Order: Lepidoptera
- Superfamily: Noctuoidea
- Family: Erebidae
- Subfamily: Arctiinae
- Genus: Eucereon
- Species: E. pilatii

Binomial name
- Eucereon pilatii Walker, 1854

Synonyms
- Eucereon pilatii Walker, 1854; Sericaria sylvius Sepp, [1845]; Eucereon conjunctum Möschler, 1878

= Eucereon pilatii =

Species of moth

Eucereon pilatii is a species of moth in the subfamily Arctiinae. It was first described by Francis Walker in 1854. It is found in Mexico, Guatemala, Honduras and Suriname.
