= Eucereon plumbicollum =

Scientific classification
- Kingdom: Animalia
- Phylum: Arthropoda
- Class: Insecta
- Order: Lepidoptera
- Superfamily: Noctuoidea
- Family: Erebidae
- Subfamily: Arctiinae
- Genus: Eucereon
- Species: E. plumbicollum

Binomial name
- Eucereon plumbicollum Hampson, 1898

Species of moth

Eucereon plumbicollum is a moth of the subfamily Arctiinae. It was described by George Hampson in 1898. It is found in Santa Catarina, Brazil.
