= Eucereon latifascia =

Scientific classification
- Kingdom: Animalia
- Phylum: Arthropoda
- Clade: Pancrustacea
- Class: Insecta
- Order: Lepidoptera
- Superfamily: Noctuoidea
- Family: Erebidae
- Subfamily: Arctiinae
- Genus: Eucereon
- Species: E. latifascia

Binomial name
- Eucereon latifascia Walker, 1856

Species of moth

Eucereon latifascia is a moth of the subfamily Arctiinae. It was described by Francis Walker in 1856. It is found in Guatemala, Honduras, Panama, Venezuela, Peru and Amazonas, Brazil.
