= Prosopidia caeruleocephala =

Scientific classification
- Domain: Eukaryota
- Kingdom: Animalia
- Phylum: Arthropoda
- Class: Insecta
- Order: Lepidoptera
- Superfamily: Noctuoidea
- Family: Erebidae
- Subfamily: Arctiinae
- Genus: Prosopidia
- Species: P. caeruleocephala

Binomial name
- Prosopidia caeruleocephala (Rothschild, 1912)

Synonyms
- Heliura caeruleocephala Rothschild, 1912

Species of moth

Prosopidia caeruleocephala is a moth in the subfamily Arctiinae. It was described by Rothschild in 1912.
