= Eucereon marica =

Scientific classification
- Domain: Eukaryota
- Kingdom: Animalia
- Phylum: Arthropoda
- Class: Insecta
- Order: Lepidoptera
- Superfamily: Noctuoidea
- Family: Erebidae
- Subfamily: Arctiinae
- Genus: Eucereon
- Species: E. marica

Binomial name
- Eucereon marica (Cramer, [1775])

Synonyms
- Sphinx marica Cramer, [1775]; Euchromia grylloides Walker, 1854; Eucerea thalassina Felder, 1874; Acridopsis virescens Möschler, 1878

Species of moth

Eucereon marica is a moth of the subfamily Arctiinae. It was described by Pieter Cramer in 1775. It is found in the Amazon region.
