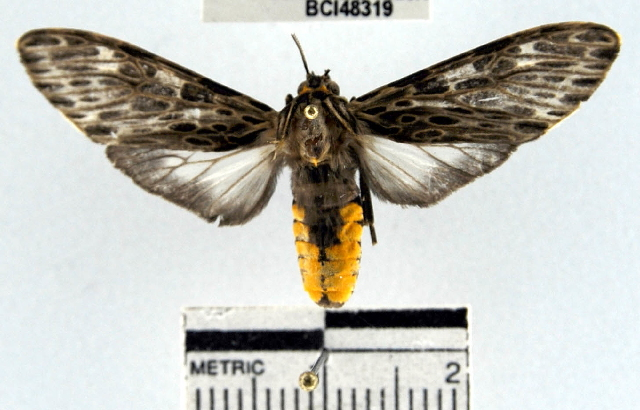

Scientific classification
- Domain: Eukaryota
- Kingdom: Animalia
- Phylum: Arthropoda
- Class: Insecta
- Order: Lepidoptera
- Superfamily: Noctuoidea
- Family: Erebidae
- Subfamily: Arctiinae
- Genus: Nelphe
- Species: N. relegatum

Binomial name
- Nelphe relegatum (Schaus, 1911)

Synonyms
- Eucereon relegatum Schaus, 1911; Eucereon relegata

= Nelphe relegatum =

Species of moth

Nelphe relegatum is a moth of the subfamily Arctiinae. It was described by William Schaus in 1911. It is found the southern United States, Mexico, Costa Rica, Nicaragua, Guatemala and Peru.
