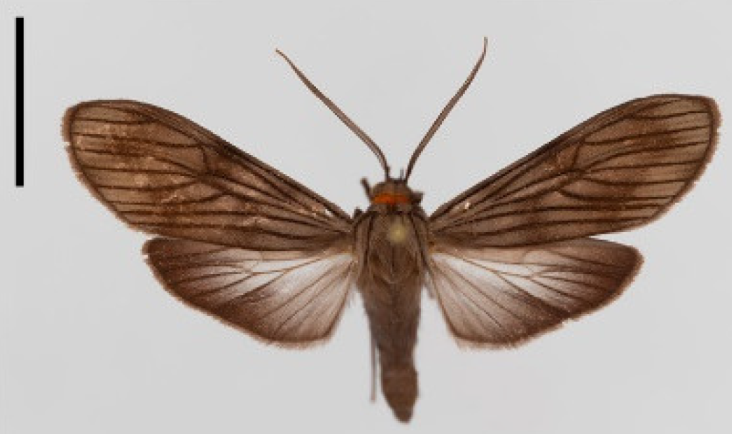

Scientific classification
- Domain: Eukaryota
- Kingdom: Animalia
- Phylum: Arthropoda
- Class: Insecta
- Order: Lepidoptera
- Superfamily: Noctuoidea
- Family: Erebidae
- Subfamily: Arctiinae
- Genus: Eucereon
- Species: E. merula

Binomial name
- Eucereon merula (Dognin, 1891)

Synonyms
- Theages merula Dognin, 1891

= Eucereon merula =

Species of moth

Eucereon merula is a moth of the subfamily Arctiinae. It was described by Paul Dognin in 1891. It is found in Ecuador.
