= Cecrita belfragei =

Scientific classification
- Kingdom: Animalia
- Phylum: Arthropoda
- Clade: Pancrustacea
- Class: Insecta
- Order: Lepidoptera
- Superfamily: Noctuoidea
- Family: Notodontidae
- Subfamily: Heterocampinae
- Genus: Cecrita
- Species: C. belfragei

Binomial name
- Cecrita belfragei (Grote, 1879)

Synonyms
- Heterocampa belfragei

Species of moth

Cecrita belfragei is a species of moth in the family Notodontidae (the prominents). It was first described by Augustus Radcliffe Grote in 1879 and it is found in North America.

The MONA or Hodges number for Cecrita belfragei is 7988.

This species was formerly a member of the genus Heterocampa, but was transferred to Cecrita as a result of research published in 2021.
