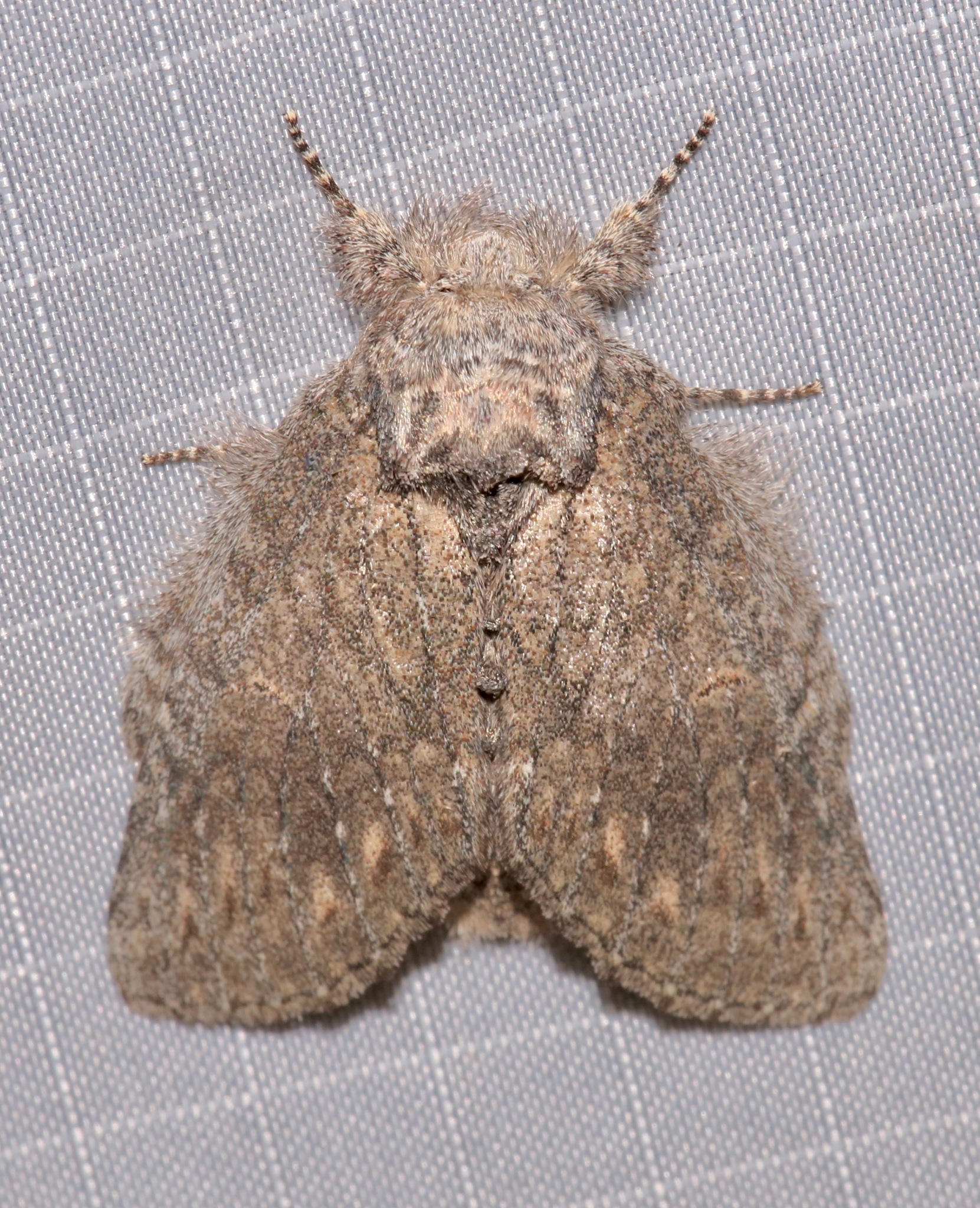
- Cecrita lunata, Arizona

Scientific classification
- Kingdom: Animalia
- Phylum: Arthropoda
- Clade: Pancrustacea
- Class: Insecta
- Order: Lepidoptera
- Superfamily: Noctuoidea
- Family: Notodontidae
- Subfamily: Heterocampinae
- Genus: Cecrita
- Species: C. lunata

Binomial name
- Cecrita lunata (H. Edwards, 1884)

Synonyms
- Heterocampa lunata

= Cecrita lunata =

Species of moth

Cecrita lunata is a species of moth in the family Notodontidae (the prominents). It was first described by Henry Edwards in 1884 and it is found in the western United States and Mexico.

The MONA or Hodges number for Cecrita lunata is 7993.

This species was formerly a member of the genus Heterocampa, but was transferred to Cecrita as a result of research published in 2021.
