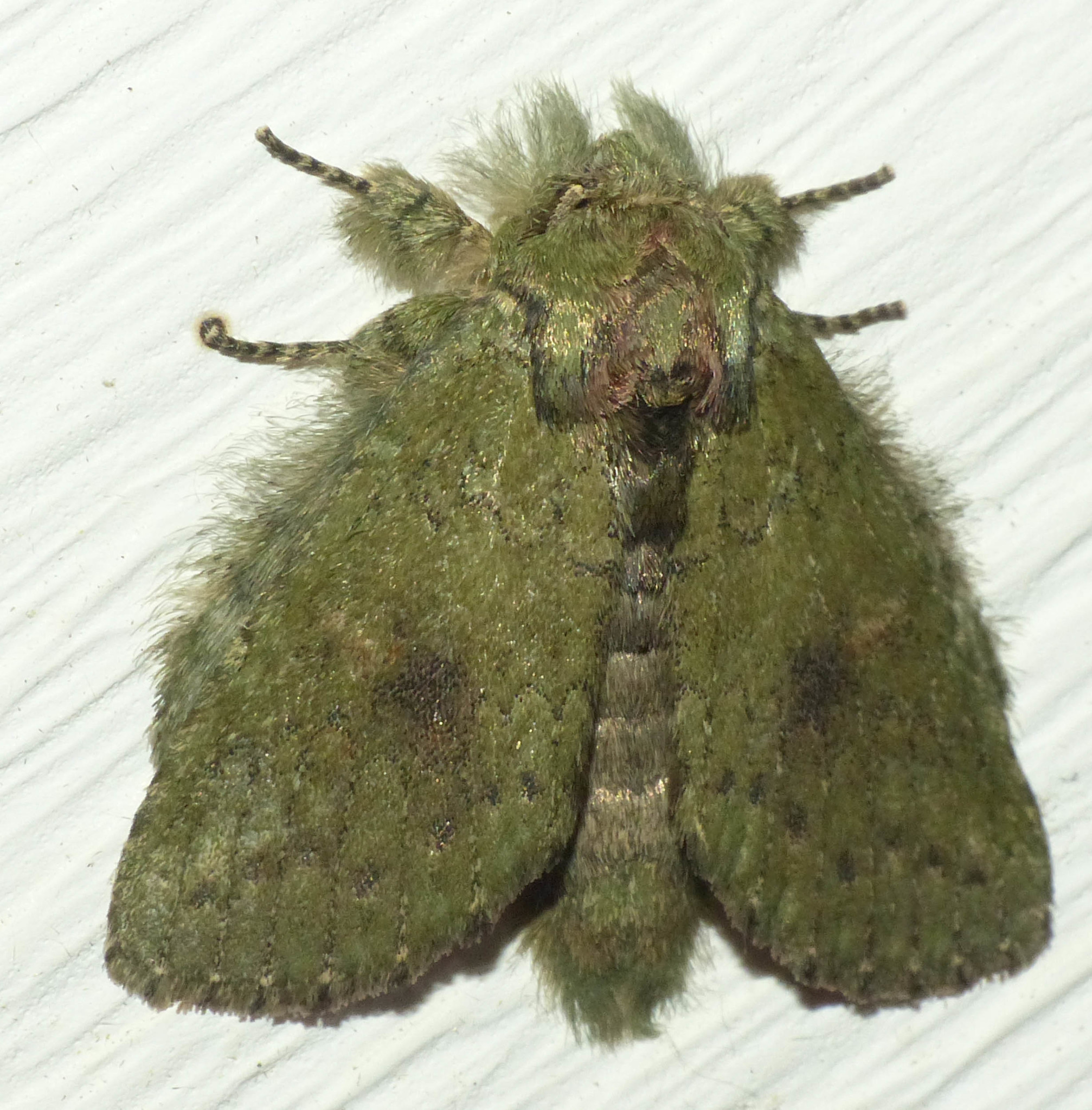
- Cecrita guttivitta, saddled prominent, New York

Scientific classification
- Kingdom: Animalia
- Phylum: Arthropoda
- Clade: Pancrustacea
- Class: Insecta
- Order: Lepidoptera
- Superfamily: Noctuoidea
- Family: Notodontidae
- Subfamily: Heterocampinae
- Genus: Cecrita
- Species: C. guttivitta

Binomial name
- Cecrita guttivitta (Walker, 1855)

Synonyms
- Heterocampa guttivitta Walker, 1855; Cecrita albiplaga Walker, 1856; Drymonia mucorea Herrich-Schaeffer, 1856; Lochmaeus harrisii Packard, 1864; Lochmaeus cinereus Packard, 1864; Drymonia indeterminata Walker, 1865; Heterocampa doubledayi Scudder, 1869; Heterocampa hugoi Chermock and Chermock, 1940

= Heterocampa guttivitta =

Species of moth

Cecrita guttivitta, the saddled prominent moth, is a species of moth of the family Notodontidae. It is found in North America, including Alabama, Arkansas, Connecticut, Delaware, Florida, Georgia, Illinois, Indiana, Iowa, Kansas, Kentucky, Maine, Maryland, Massachusetts, Minnesota, New Brunswick, New Hampshire, New Jersey, New York, North Carolina, Ohio, Oklahoma, Ontario, Pennsylvania, South Carolina, Tennessee, Vermont, Virginia, West Virginia and Wisconsin.

The wingspan is about 40 mm. Adults are brownish to greenish grey with white or black spots on the forewings. There is one generation per year.

The larvae feed on the foliage of a wide range of woody plants, including apple, birch, blueberry, dogwood, hazel, maple, oak, sumac and walnut.

== Gallery ==
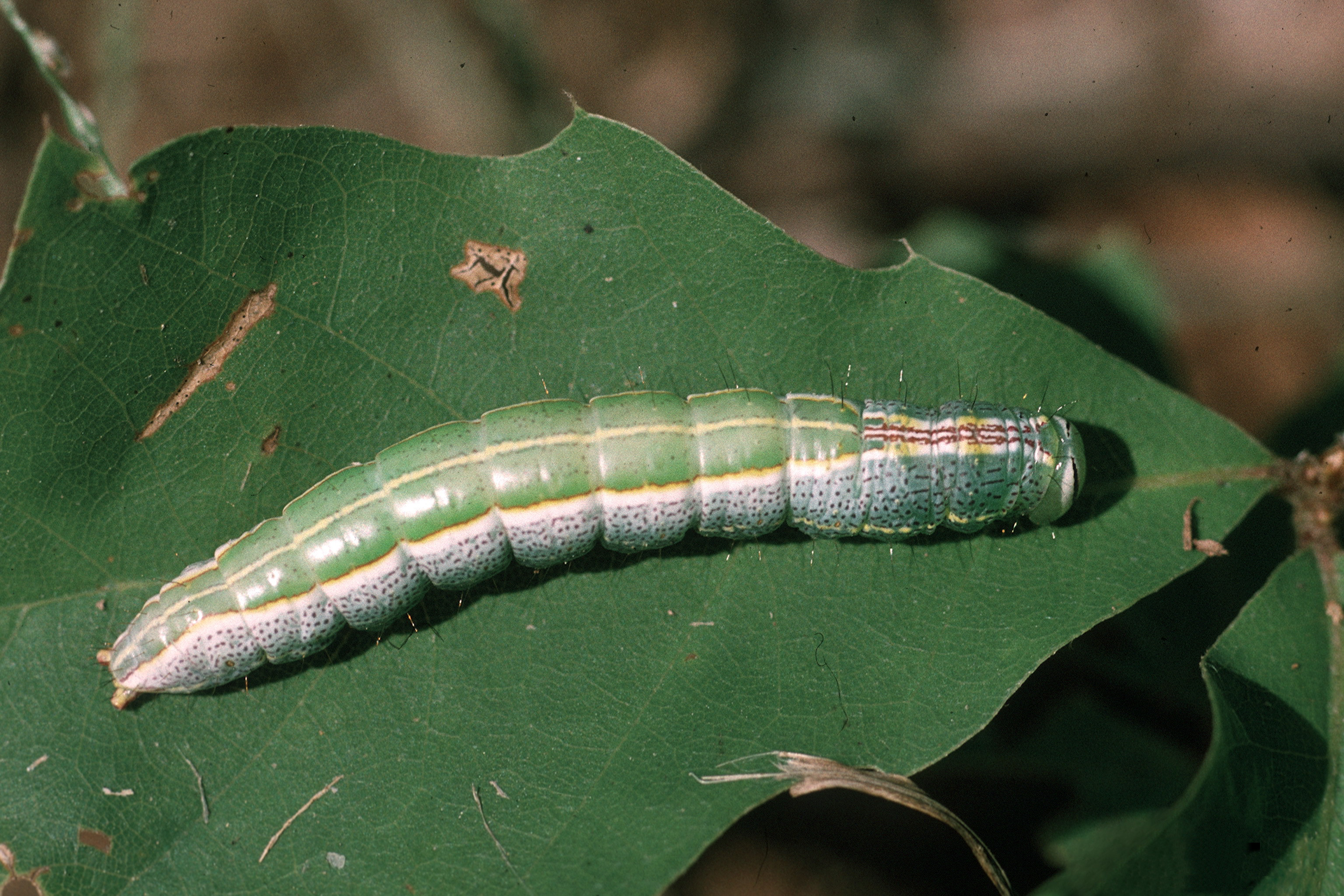
Larva

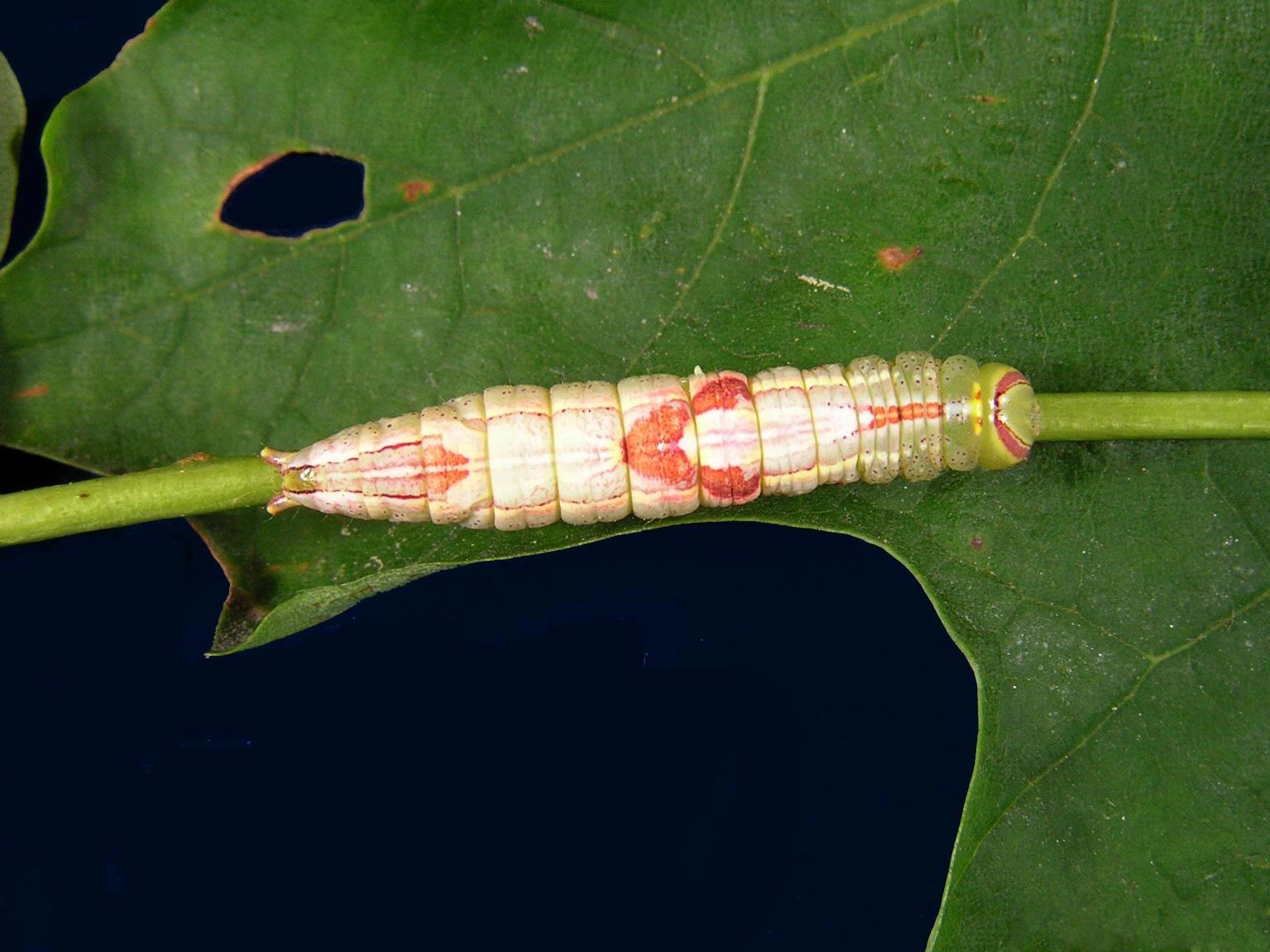
Larva

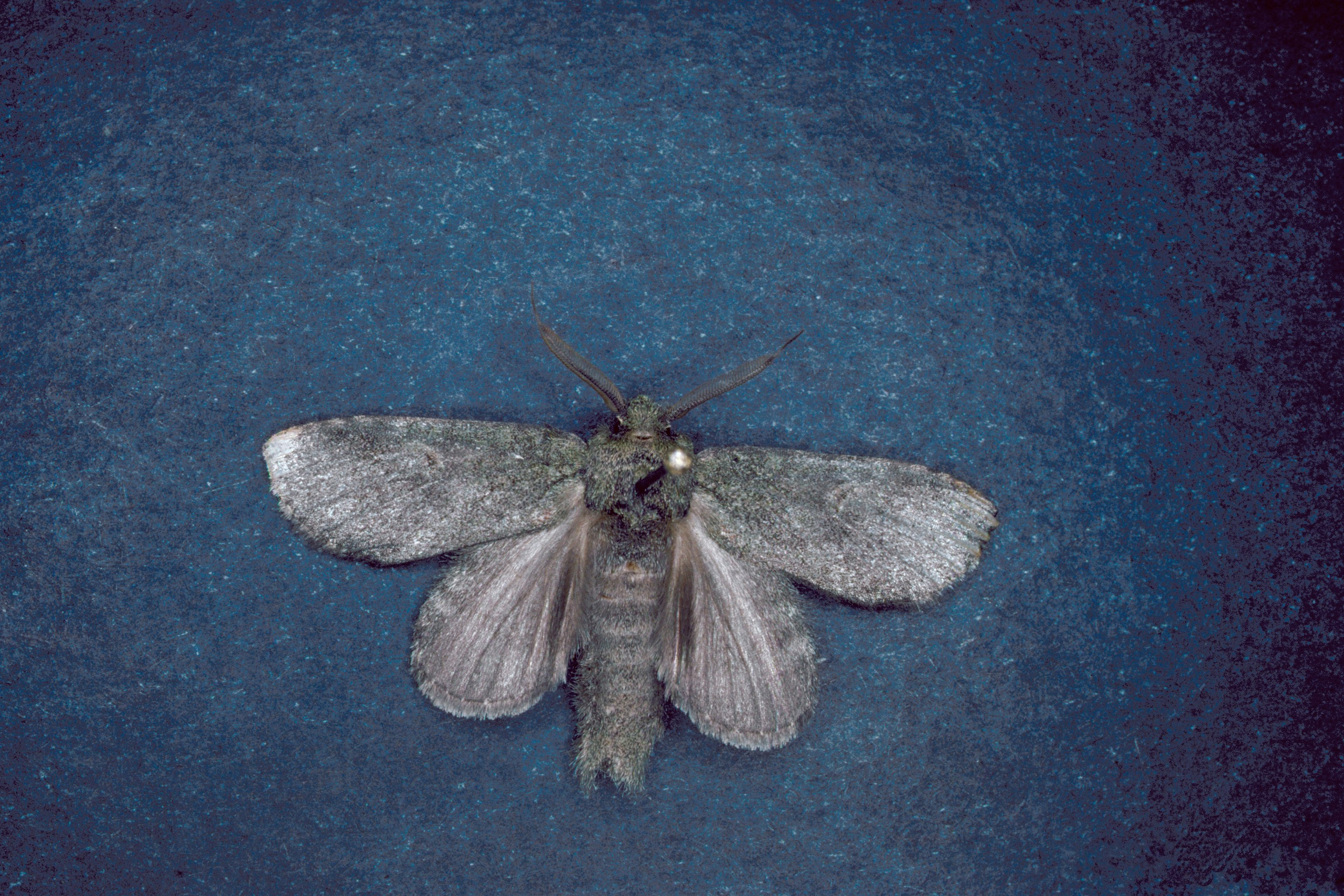
Adult
