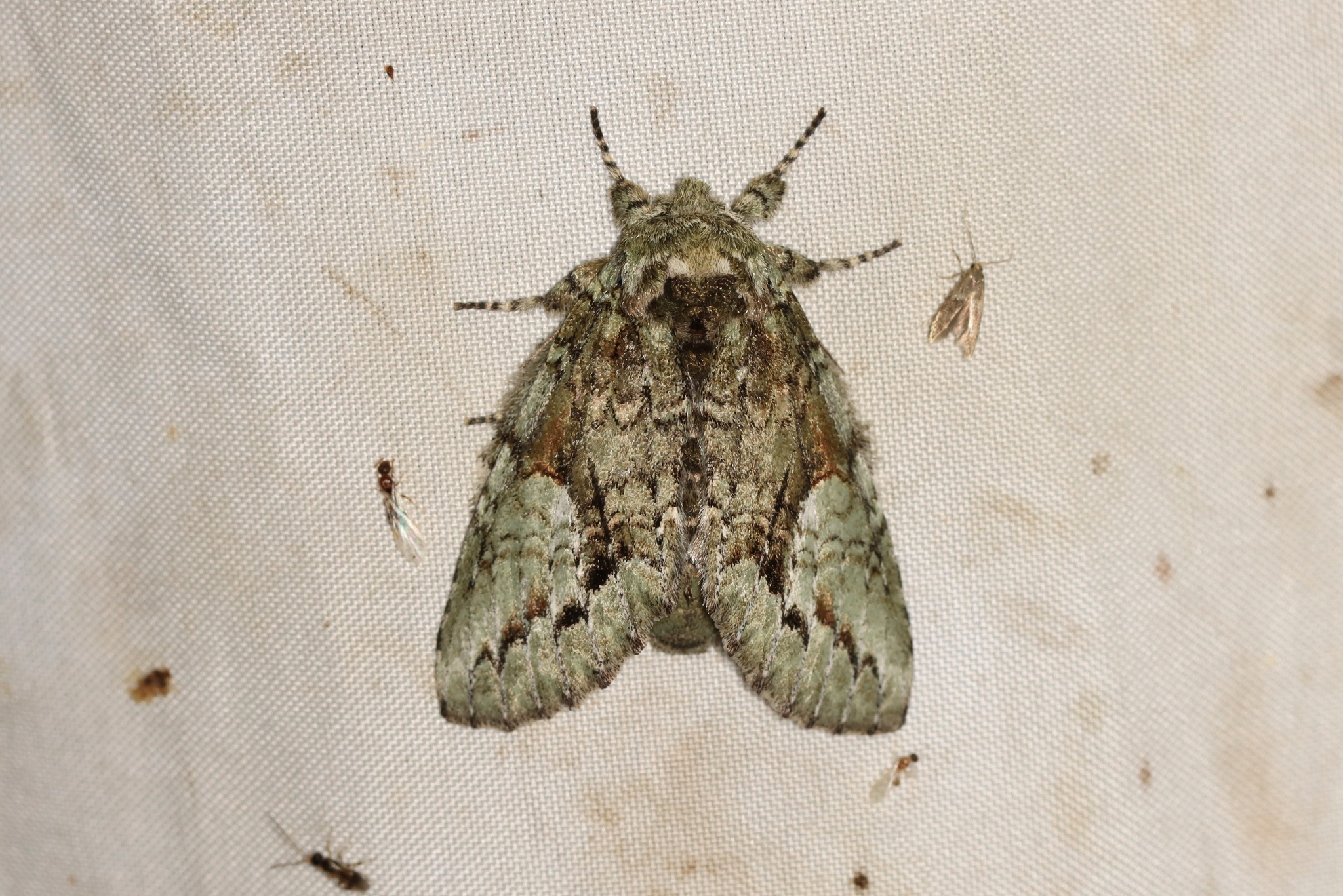
- Heterocampa pulverea, Massachusetts

Scientific classification
- Kingdom: Animalia
- Phylum: Arthropoda
- Clade: Pancrustacea
- Class: Insecta
- Order: Lepidoptera
- Superfamily: Noctuoidea
- Family: Notodontidae
- Genus: Heterocampa
- Species: H. pulverea

Binomial name
- Heterocampa pulverea Grote & Robinson, 1867

= Heterocampa pulverea =

Species of moth

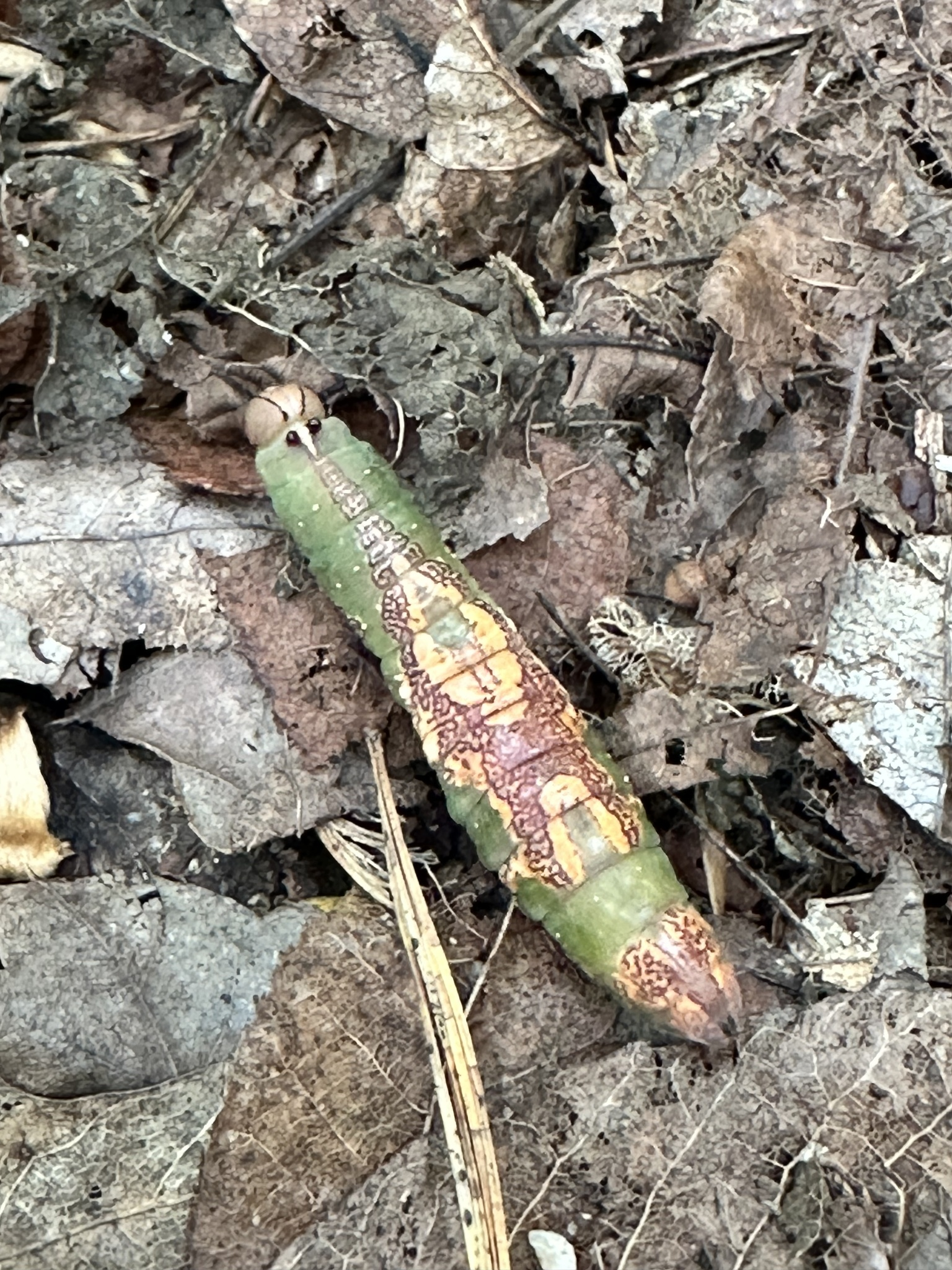
Heterocampa pulverea, New York

Heterocampa pulverea is a species of moth in the family Notodontidae (the prominents). It is a widespread species found in oak forests of the eastern United States and Canada. It was formerly treated as a subspecies of Heterocampa umbrata.
