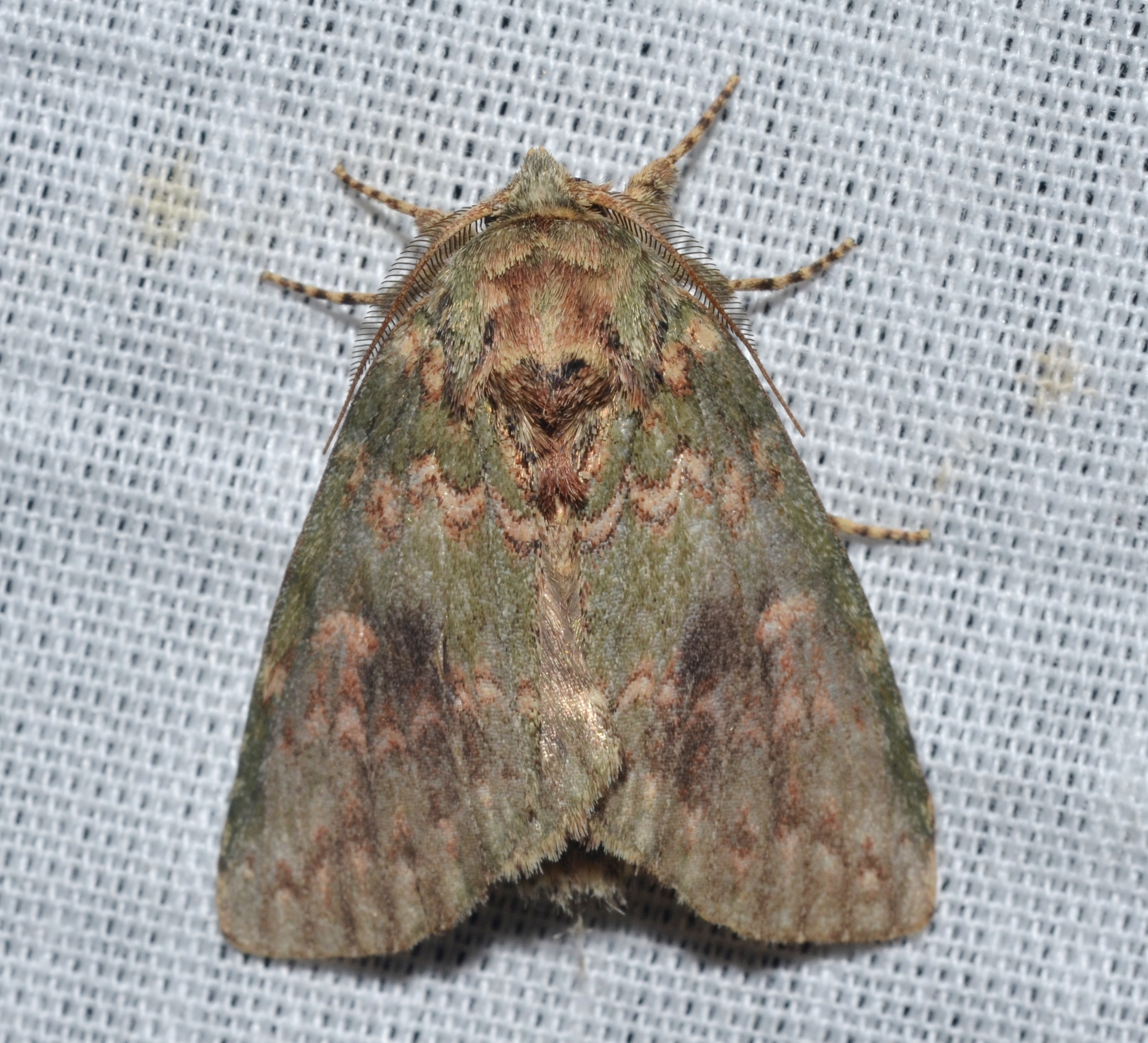

Conservation status
- Secure (NatureServe)

Scientific classification
- Kingdom: Animalia
- Phylum: Arthropoda
- Clade: Pancrustacea
- Class: Insecta
- Order: Lepidoptera
- Superfamily: Noctuoidea
- Family: Notodontidae
- Genus: Cecrita
- Species: C. biundata

Binomial name
- Cecrita biundata (Walker, 1855)

Synonyms
- Heterocampa mollis Walker, 1865; Heterocampa olivata Packard, 1864; Heterocampa semiplaga Walker; Heterocampa viridescens Walker, 1865

= Cecrita biundata =

Species of moth

Cecrita biundata, the wavy-lined heterocampa, is a species of moth in the family Notodontidae (the prominents). It was first described by Francis Walker in 1855 and it is found in North America.
