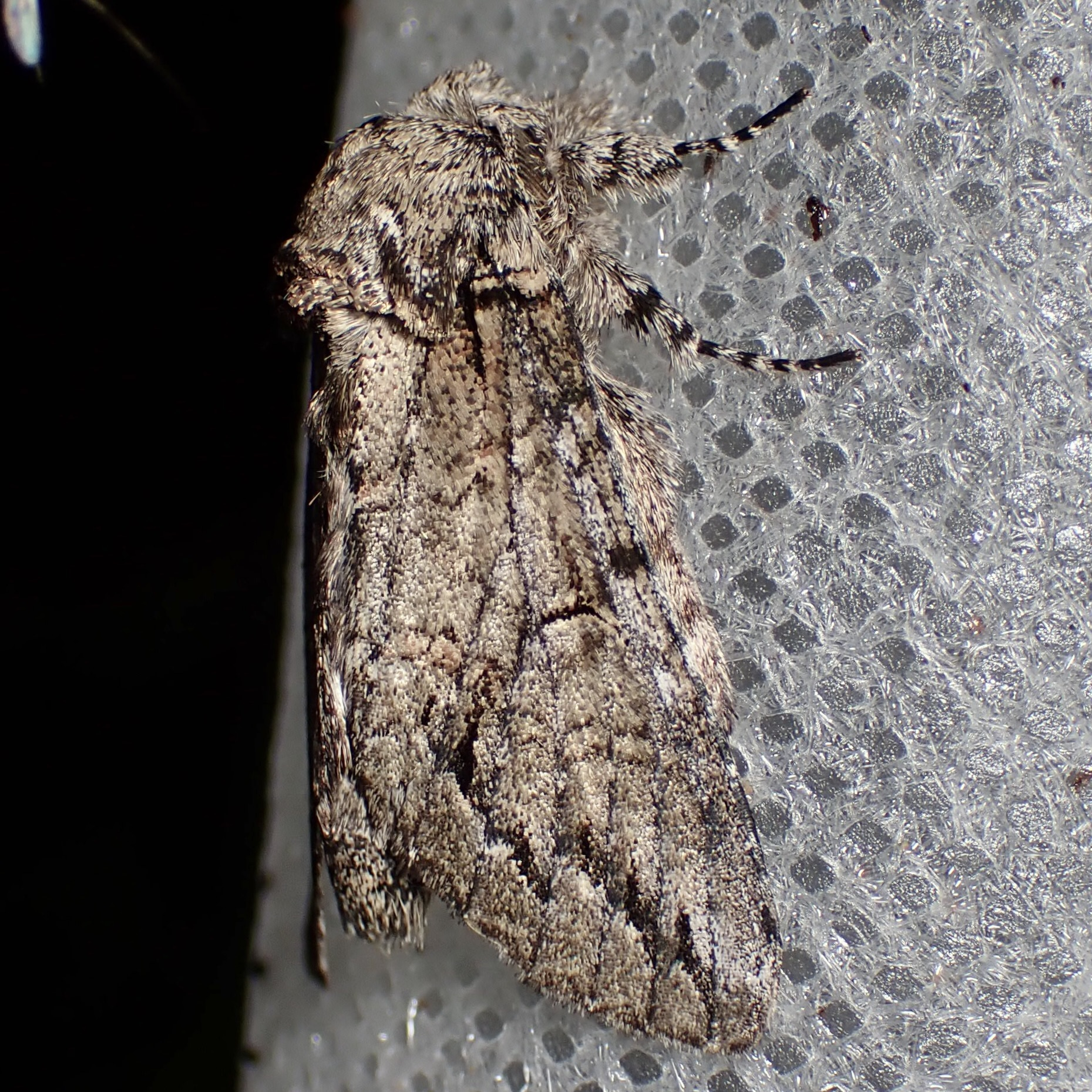
- Heterocampa averna, México

Scientific classification
- Kingdom: Animalia
- Phylum: Arthropoda
- Clade: Pancrustacea
- Class: Insecta
- Order: Lepidoptera
- Superfamily: Noctuoidea
- Family: Notodontidae
- Subfamily: Heterocampinae
- Genus: Heterocampa
- Species: H. averna

Binomial name
- Heterocampa averna Barnes & McDunnough, 1910

= Heterocampa averna =

Species of moth

Heterocampa averna is a species of prominent moth in the family Notodontidae. It was described by William Barnes and James Halliday McDunnough in 1910 and is found in North America.

The MONA or Hodges number for Heterocampa averna is 7991.
