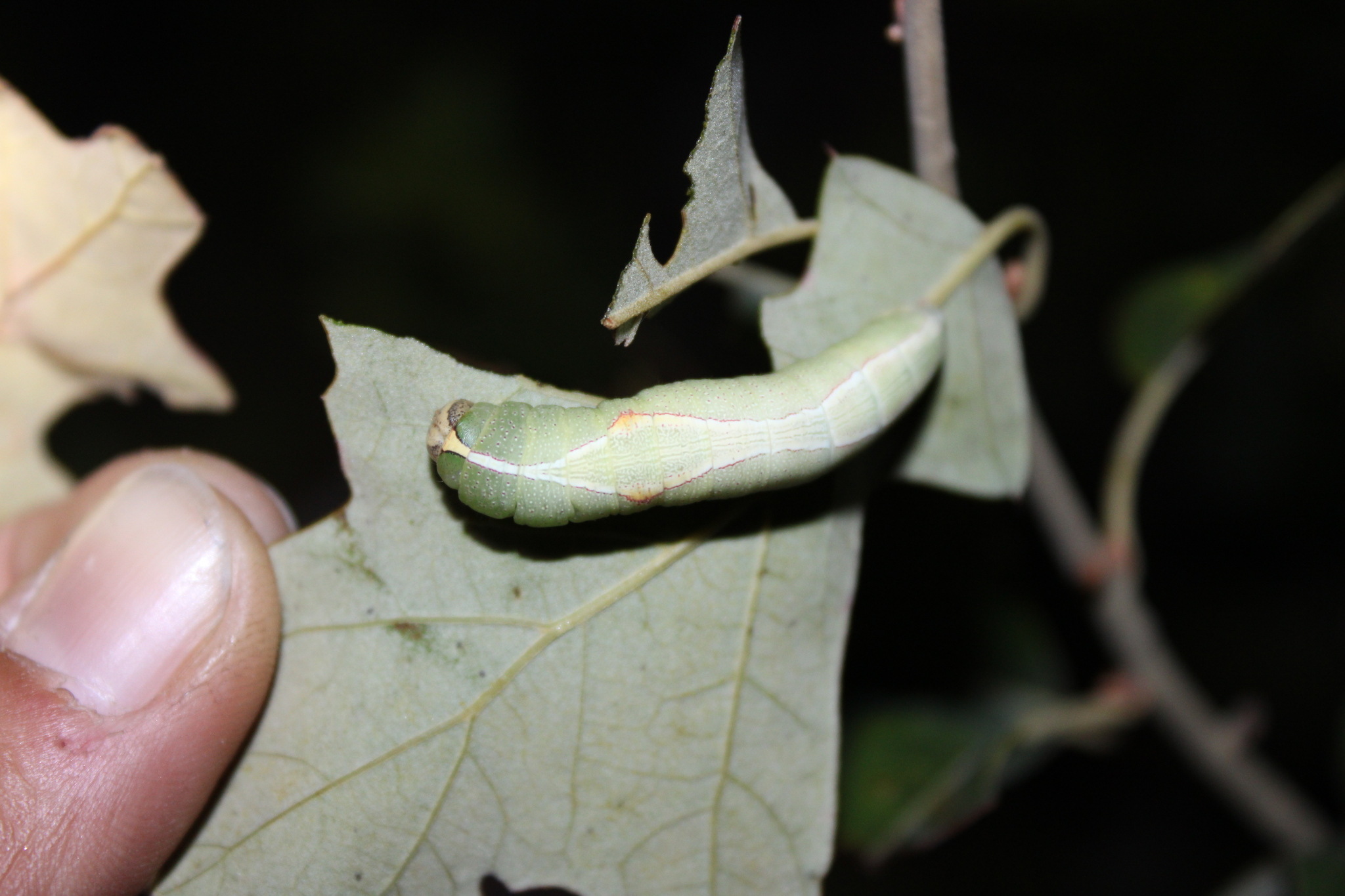
- Heterocampa varia caterpillar, Massachusetts

Scientific classification
- Kingdom: Animalia
- Phylum: Arthropoda
- Clade: Pancrustacea
- Class: Insecta
- Order: Lepidoptera
- Superfamily: Noctuoidea
- Family: Notodontidae
- Genus: Heterocampa
- Species: H. varia

Binomial name
- Heterocampa varia Walker, 1855

= Heterocampa varia =

Species of moth

Heterocampa varia, the sandplain heterocampa, is a species of moth in the family Notodontidae (the prominents). Other common names include the alpine mouse-ear and white-marked heterocampa. It was first described by Francis Walker in 1855 and it is found in North America.

The MONA or Hodges number for Heterocampa varia is 7982.
