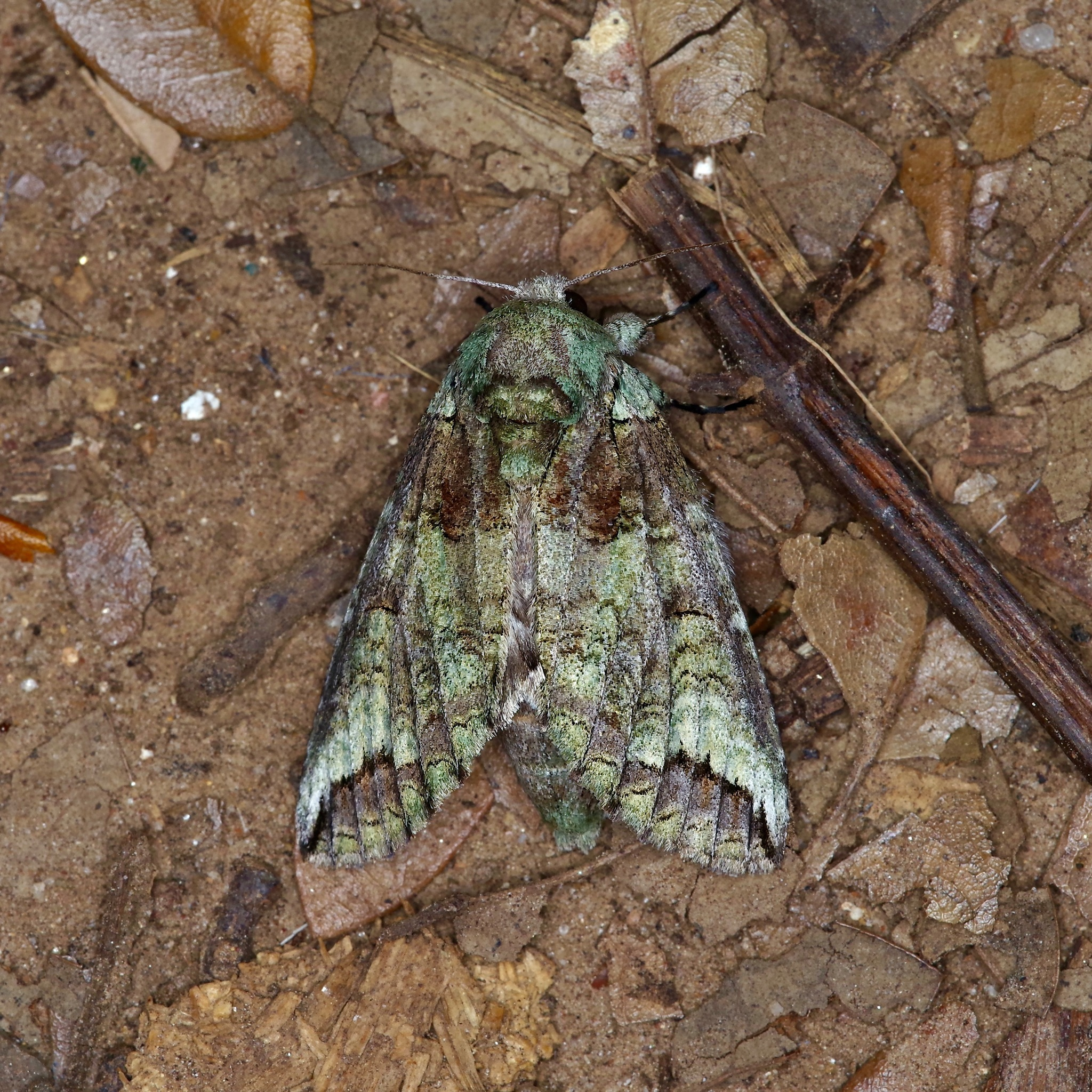
- Heterocampa astartoides, Texas

Scientific classification
- Kingdom: Animalia
- Phylum: Arthropoda
- Clade: Pancrustacea
- Class: Insecta
- Order: Lepidoptera
- Superfamily: Noctuoidea
- Family: Notodontidae
- Genus: Heterocampa
- Species: H. astartoides

Binomial name
- Heterocampa astartoides Benjamin, 1932

= Heterocampa astartoides =

Species of moth

Heterocampa astartoides is a species of moth in the prominents family Notodontidae. It was first described by Foster Hendrickson Benjamin in 1932 and it is found in North America.
