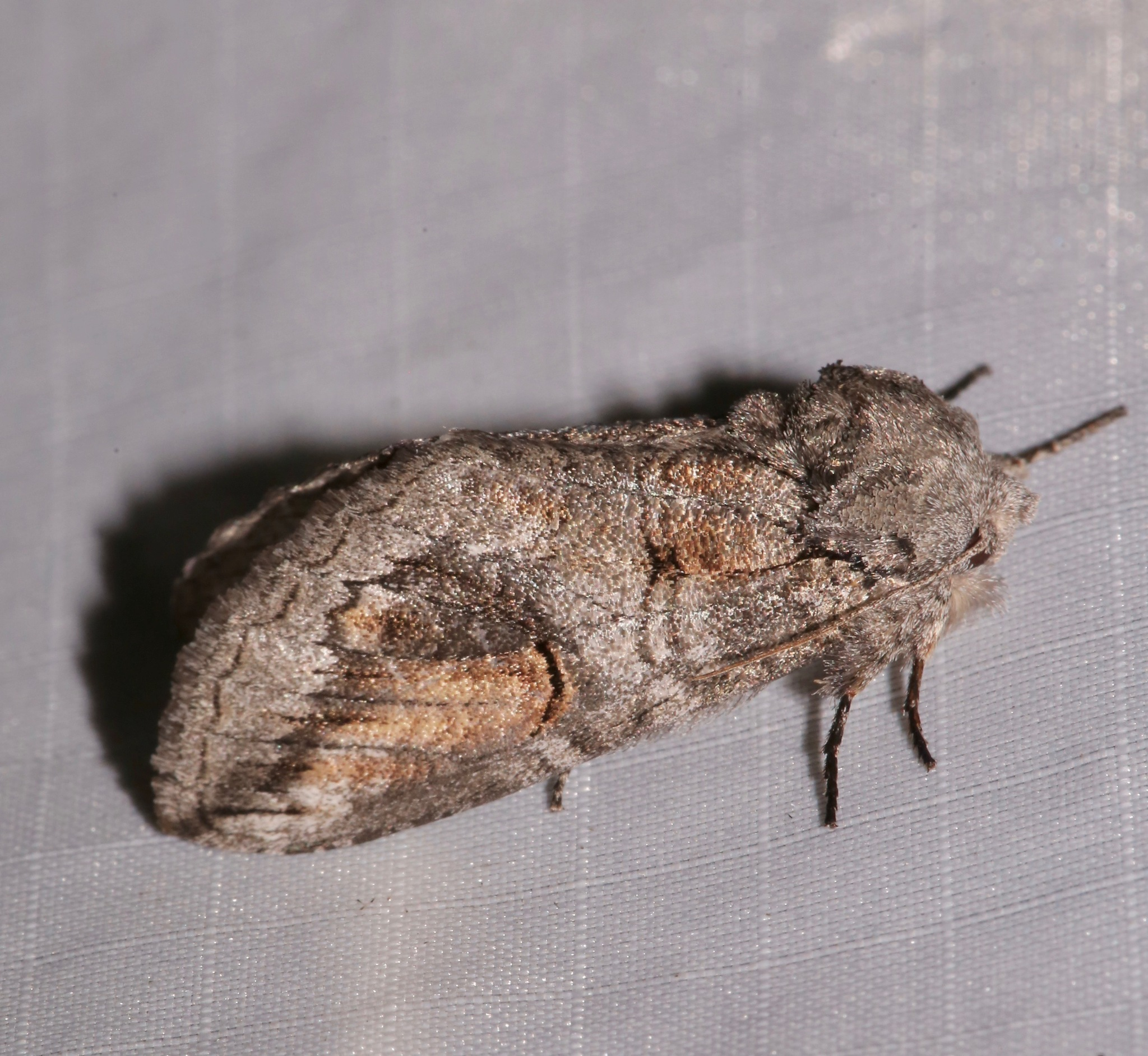
- Heterocampa secessionis, Texas

Scientific classification
- Kingdom: Animalia
- Phylum: Arthropoda
- Clade: Pancrustacea
- Class: Insecta
- Order: Lepidoptera
- Superfamily: Noctuoidea
- Family: Notodontidae
- Genus: Heterocampa
- Species: H. secessionis

Binomial name
- Heterocampa secessionis Benjamin, 1932

= Heterocampa secessionis =

Species of moth

Heterocampa secessionis is a species of moth in the family Notodontidae (the prominents). It was first described by Foster Hendrickson Benjamin in 1932 and it is found in North America.

The MONA or Hodges number for Heterocampa secessionis is 7981.
