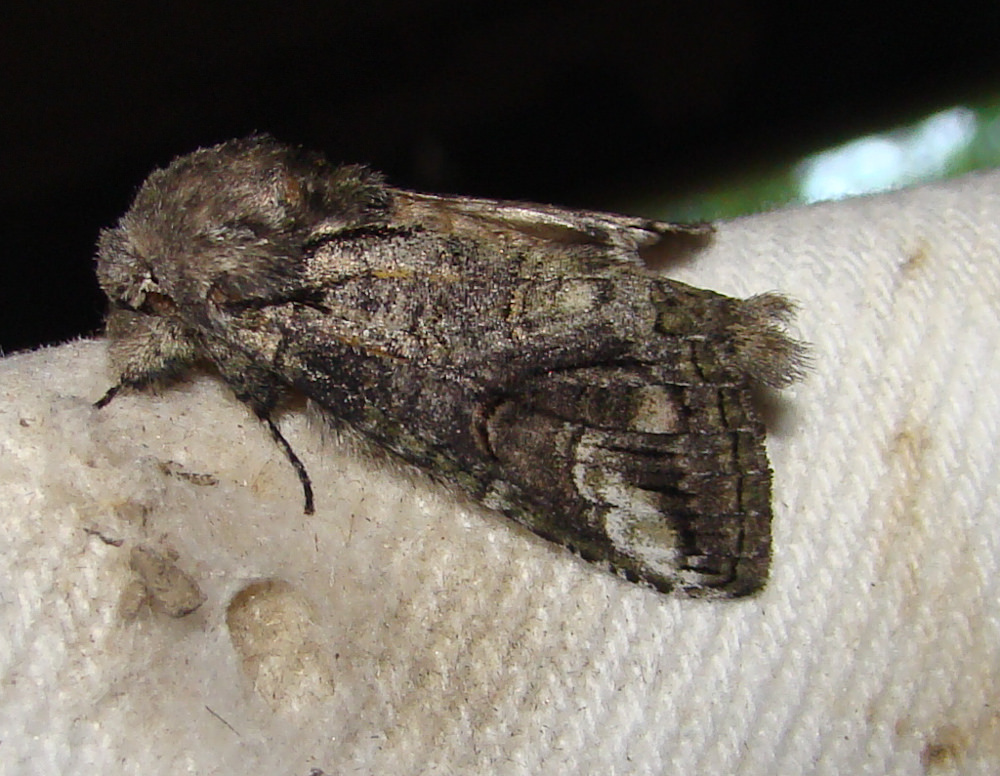

Scientific classification
- Kingdom: Animalia
- Phylum: Arthropoda
- Clade: Pancrustacea
- Class: Insecta
- Order: Lepidoptera
- Superfamily: Noctuoidea
- Family: Notodontidae
- Genus: Heterocampa
- Species: H. obliqua

Binomial name
- Heterocampa obliqua Packard, 1864

= Heterocampa obliqua =

Species of moth

Heterocampa obliqua, the oblique heterocampa or oblique prominent, is a species of moth in the family Notodontidae (the prominents). It was first described by Alpheus Spring Packard in 1864 and it is found in North America.

The MONA or Hodges number for Heterocampa obliqua is 7983.
