= Heterocampa amanda =

Scientific classification
- Kingdom: Animalia
- Phylum: Arthropoda
- Clade: Pancrustacea
- Class: Insecta
- Order: Lepidoptera
- Superfamily: Noctuoidea
- Family: Notodontidae
- Genus: Heterocampa
- Species: H. amanda

Binomial name
- Heterocampa amanda Barnes & Lindsey, 1921

Species of moth

Heterocampa amanda is a species of moth in the family Notodontidae (the prominents). It was first described by William Barnes and Arthur Ward Lindsey in 1921 and it is found in North America.

The MONA or Hodges number for Heterocampa amanda is 7992.
