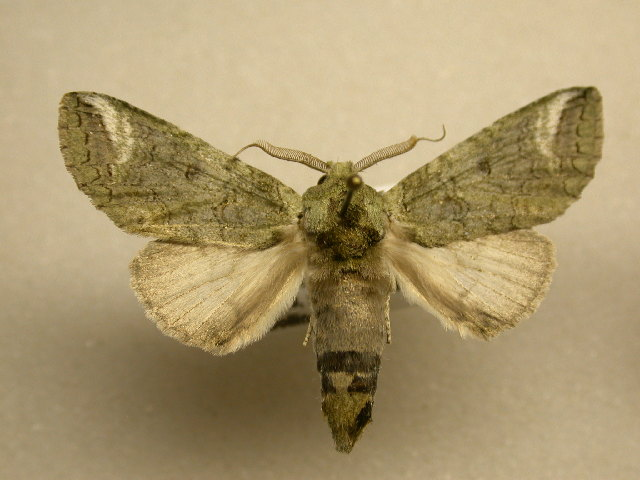

Scientific classification
- Kingdom: Animalia
- Phylum: Arthropoda
- Clade: Pancrustacea
- Class: Insecta
- Order: Lepidoptera
- Superfamily: Noctuoidea
- Family: Notodontidae
- Genus: Heterocampa
- Species: H. astarte

Binomial name
- Heterocampa astarte Doubleday, 1841

= Heterocampa astarte =

Species of moth

Heterocampa astarte, the astarte prominent moth, is a species of moth in the family Notodontidae (the prominents). It was first described by entomologist Edward Doubleday in 1841 and it is found in North America.

The MONA or Hodges number for Heterocampa astarte is 7977.
