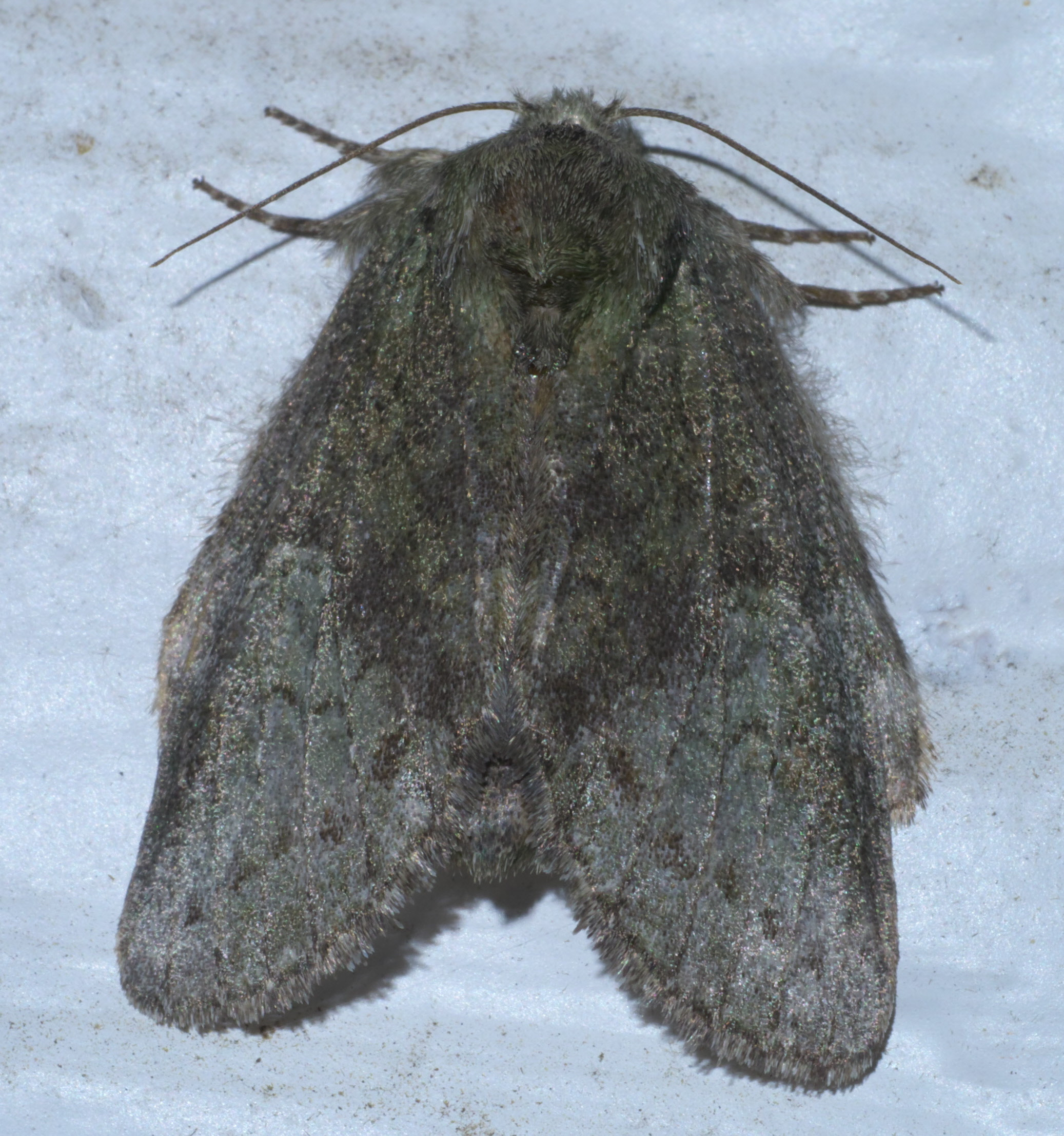

Scientific classification
- Kingdom: Animalia
- Phylum: Arthropoda
- Clade: Pancrustacea
- Class: Insecta
- Order: Lepidoptera
- Superfamily: Noctuoidea
- Family: Notodontidae
- Subfamily: Heterocampinae
- Genus: Heterocampa
- Species: H. umbrata

Binomial name
- Heterocampa umbrata Walker, 1855

= Heterocampa umbrata =

Species of moth

Heterocampa umbrata, the white-blotched heterocampa, is a species of moth in the family of prominent moths (Notodontidae). It was first described by Francis Walker in 1855. It is found in Florida and coastal Georgia.
