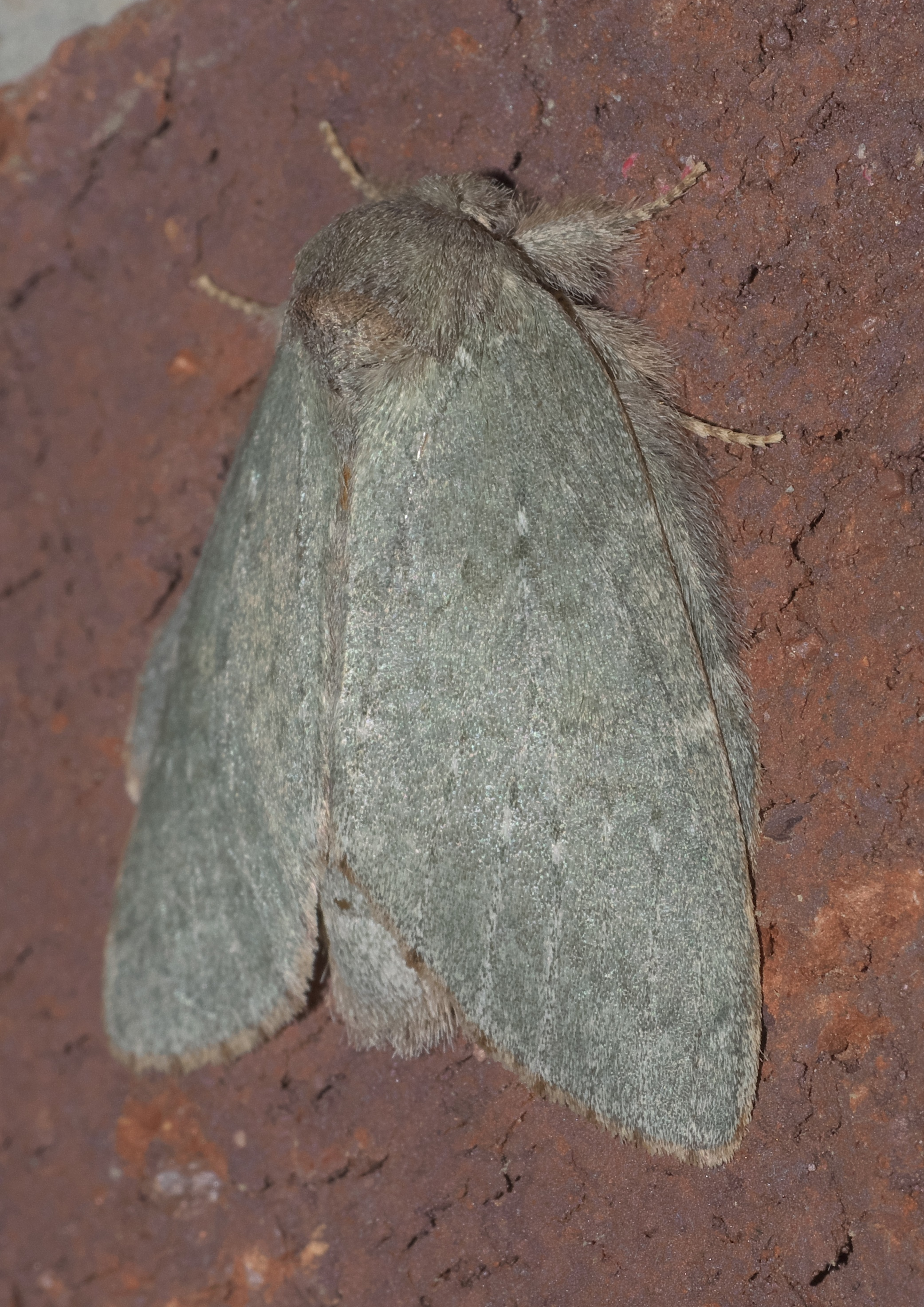

Scientific classification
- Kingdom: Animalia
- Phylum: Arthropoda
- Clade: Pancrustacea
- Class: Insecta
- Order: Lepidoptera
- Superfamily: Noctuoidea
- Family: Notodontidae
- Subfamily: Heterocampinae
- Genus: Heterocampa; Doubleday, 1841

= Heterocampa =

Genus of moths

Heterocampa is a genus of prominent moths in the family Notodontidae. There are about 18 described species in Heterocampa, found in North, Central, and South America.

As a result of research published in 2021, some species of Heterocampa have been moved to the genera Cecrita, Macrurocampa, and Rifargia.

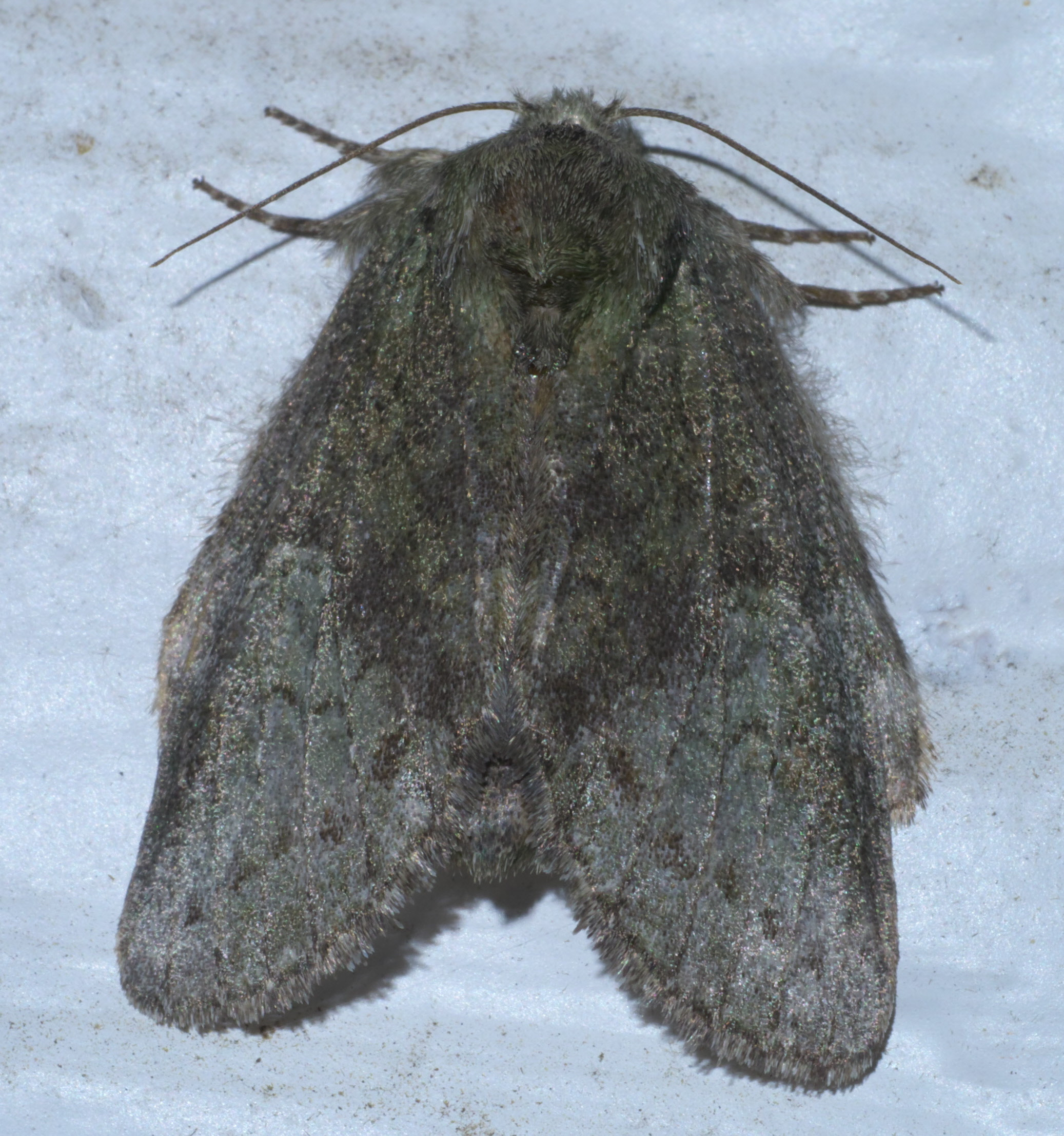
Heterocampa umbrata, white-blotched heterocampa

== Species ==
These 18 species belong to the genus Heterocampa:

- Heterocampa albidiscata Schaus, 1904
- Heterocampa amanda Barnes & Lindsey, 1921
- Heterocampa andradora (Dyar 1910)
- Heterocampa astarte Doubleday, 1841 (astarte prominent moth)
- Heterocampa astartoides Benjamin, 1932
- Heterocampa averna Barnes & McDunnough, 1910
- Heterocampa bactrea Schaus, 1905
- Heterocampa baracoana Schaus, 1904
- Heterocampa daona Druce, 1904
- Heterocampa obliqua Packard, 1864 (oblique heterocampa)
- Heterocampa otiosa (Schaus, 1906)
- Heterocampa pulverea Grote & Robinson, 1867
- Heterocampa rufinans (Dyar, 1921)
- Heterocampa santiago Schaus, 1904
- Heterocampa secessionis Benjamin, 1932
- Heterocampa sylla Druce, 1887
- Heterocampa umbrata Walker, 1855 (white-blotched heterocampa)
- Heterocampa varia Walker, 1855 (sandplain heterocampa)
