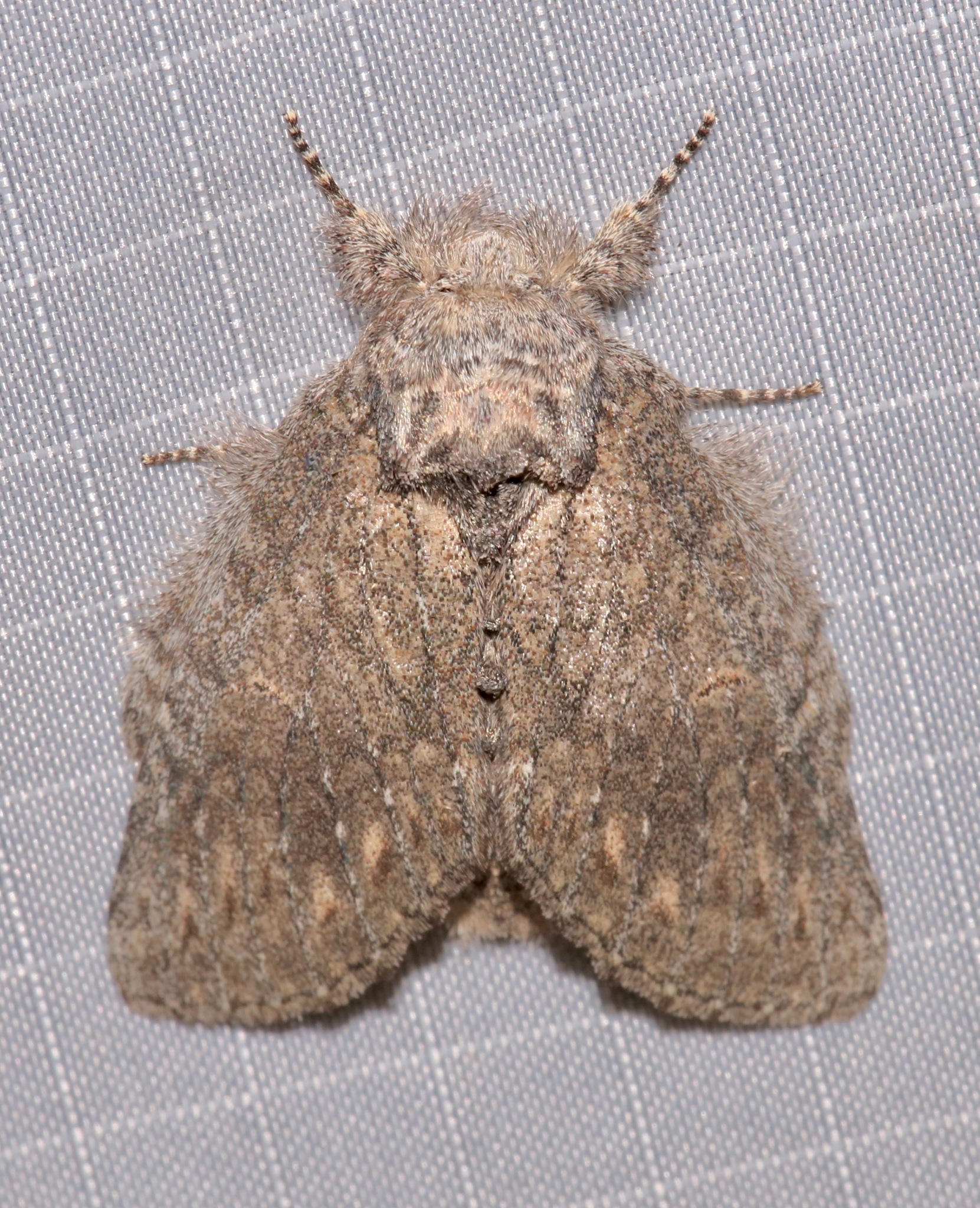
- Cecrita lunata

Scientific classification
- Kingdom: Animalia
- Phylum: Arthropoda
- Clade: Pancrustacea
- Class: Insecta
- Order: Lepidoptera
- Superfamily: Noctuoidea
- Family: Notodontidae
- Subfamily: Heterocampinae
- Genus: Cecrita; Walker, 1855

= Cecrita =

Genus of moths

Cecrita is a genus of prominent moths in the family Notodontidae. There are about eight described species in Cecrita, found in North, Central, and South America.

== Species ==
These eight species belong to the genus Cecrita:

- Cecrita belfragei Grote, 1879
- Cecrita biundata Walker, 1855 (wavy-lined heterocampa)
- Cecrita cubana Grote, 1866 (Cuban heterocampa moth)
- Cecrita franclemonti Miller, 2021
- Cecrita guttivitta (Walker, 1855) (saddled prominent)
- Cecrita incongrua Barnes & Benjamin, 1924 (Dog's-tooth violet)
- Cecrita lunata H. Edwards, 1884
- Cecrita plumosa Miller, 2021
