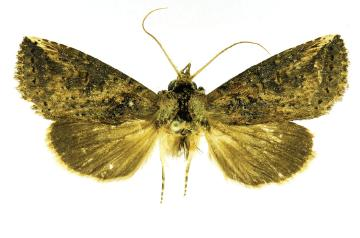

Scientific classification
- Kingdom: Animalia
- Phylum: Arthropoda
- Class: Insecta
- Order: Lepidoptera
- Superfamily: Noctuoidea
- Family: Notodontidae
- Subfamily: Nystaleinae
- Genus: Hippia; Möschler, 1878

= Hippia (moth) =

Genus of moths

Hippia is a genus of moths of the family Notodontidae described by Heinrich Benno Möschler in 1878.

== Species ==
- Hippia mumetes (Cramer, 1775)
- Hippia vittipalpis (Walker, [1858])

== Former species ==
- Hippia insularis is now Elasmia insularis (Grote, 1866)
- Hippia mandela is now Elasmia mandela (H. Druce, 1887)
- Hippia packardii is now Elasmia packardii (Morrison, 1875)
