= Lepasta majorina =

Scientific classification
- Kingdom: Animalia
- Phylum: Arthropoda
- Class: Insecta
- Order: Lepidoptera
- Superfamily: Noctuoidea
- Family: Notodontidae
- Genus: Lepasta
- Species: L. majorina

Binomial name
- Lepasta majorina Dognin, 1914

Synonyms
- Lepasta bractea majorina Dognin, 1914

Species of moth

Lepasta majorina is a moth of the family Notodontidae. It is found in Colombia and Ecuador.

== Taxonomy ==
Dognin described majorina as a subspecies of Lepasta bractea in 1914. It was raised to species status in 2011.
