= Hippia =

Hippia may refer to:

- Hippia (plant), a genus of flowering plant in the sunflower family
- Hippia (moth), a genus of moth of the family Notodontidae
- Hippia, an epithet of the Greek goddess Athena
- Hippia, alternate name of Phalanna, an ancient city of Thessaly

== See also ==
- Hippias (disambiguation)
