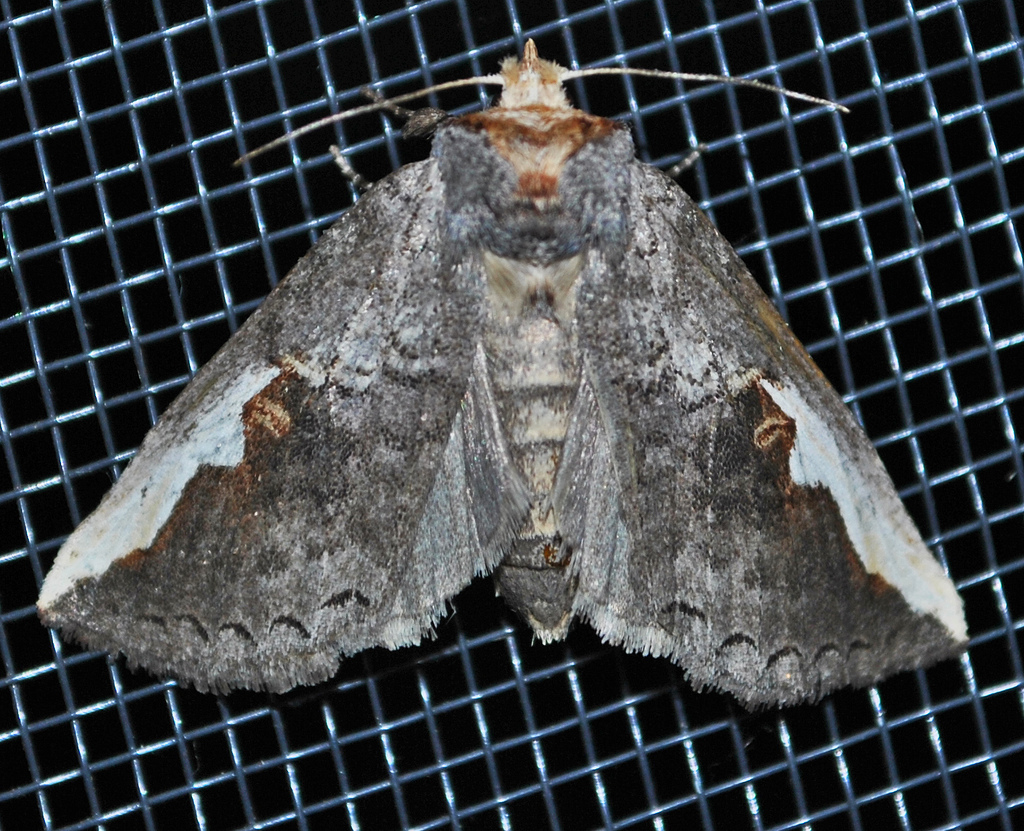
- Symmerista albifrons

Scientific classification
- Kingdom: Animalia
- Phylum: Arthropoda
- Clade: Pancrustacea
- Class: Insecta
- Order: Lepidoptera
- Superfamily: Noctuoidea
- Family: Notodontidae
- Subfamily: Nystaleinae
- Genus: Symmerista; Hübner, [1821]

= Symmerista =

Genus of moths

Symmerista is a genus of moths of the family Notodontidae erected by Jacob Hübner in 1821.

== Species ==
- Symmerista albifrons (Smith, 1797)
- Symmerista aura Chacón, 2014
- Symmerista canicosta Franclemont, 1946
- Symmerista inbioi Chacón, 2014
- Symmerista leucitys Franclemont, 1946
- Symmerista luisdiegogomezi Chacón, 2014
- Symmerista minaei Chacón, 2014
- Symmerista suavis (Barnes, 1901)
- Symmerista zacualpana (Draudt, 1932)

== Former species ==
- Symmerista tlotzin now Elymiotis tlotzin (Schaus, 1892)
