= Dognina =

Scientific classification
- Domain: Eukaryota
- Kingdom: Animalia
- Phylum: Arthropoda
- Class: Insecta
- Order: Lepidoptera
- Superfamily: Noctuoidea
- Family: Notodontidae
- Subfamily: Nystaleinae
- Genus: Dognina; Schaus, 1901

Genus of moths

Dognina is a genus of moths of the family Notodontidae.

== Selected species ==
- Dognina honeyi Miller, 2011
- Dognina veltini (Dognin, 1890)
