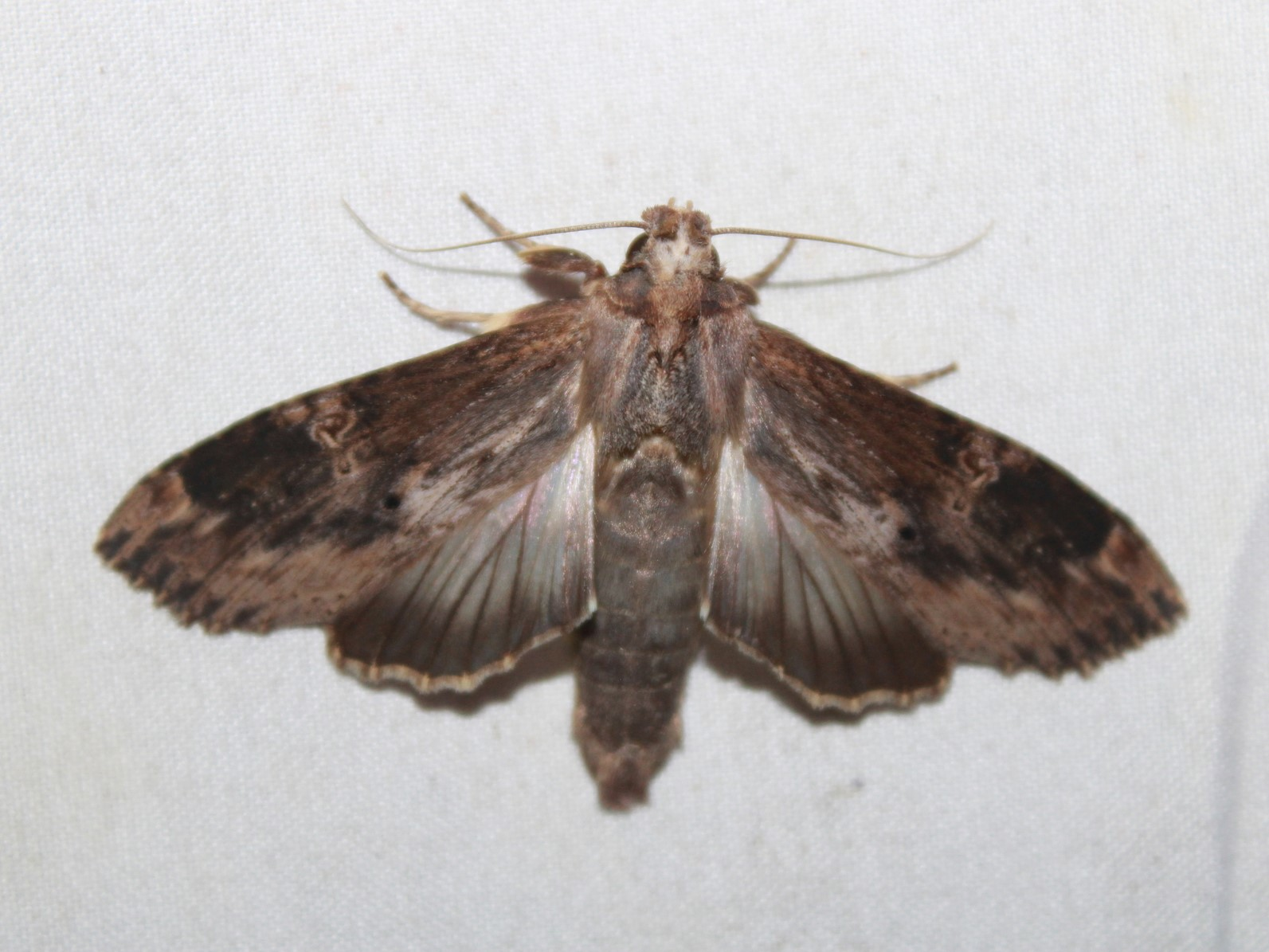

Scientific classification
- Kingdom: Animalia
- Phylum: Arthropoda
- Class: Insecta
- Order: Lepidoptera
- Superfamily: Noctuoidea
- Family: Notodontidae
- Genus: Nystalea
- Species: N. eutalanta

Binomial name
- Nystalea eutalanta Dyar, 1921

= Nystalea eutalanta =

Species of moth

Nystalea eutalanta, commonly known as Dyar's tropical prominent moth, is a species of prominent moth in the family Notodontidae. It was first described by Harrison Gray Dyar Jr. in 1921 and it is found in North America.
