= Pentobesa =

Scientific classification
- Kingdom: Animalia
- Phylum: Arthropoda
- Class: Insecta
- Order: Lepidoptera
- Superfamily: Noctuoidea
- Family: Notodontidae
- Subfamily: Nystaleinae
- Genus: Pentobesa; Schaus, 1901

Genus of moths

Pentobesa is a genus of moths of the family Notodontidae described by William Schaus in 1901.

== Species ==
- Pentobesa anapiesma Weller, 1991
- Pentobesa ankistron Weller, 1991
- Pentobesa aroata (Schaus, 1901)
- Pentobesa lignicolor Möschler, 1877
- Pentobesa seriata (Druce, 1887)
- Pentobesa sinistra Weller, 1991
- Pentobesa smithsoni Weller, 1991
- Pentobesa valta Schaus, 1901
- Pentobesa xylinoides (Walker, 1866)
