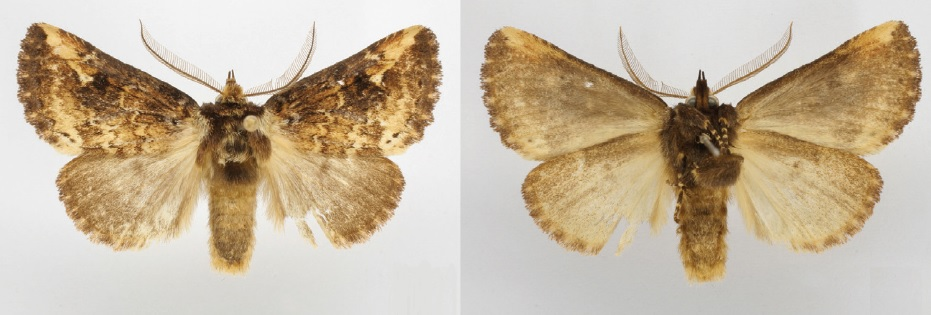
- Male dorsal (left) and ventral views
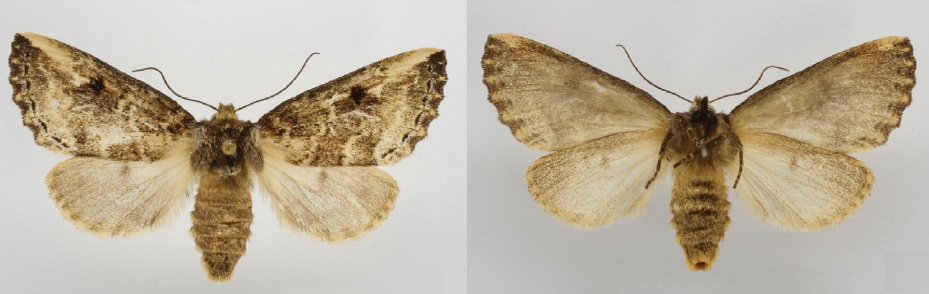
- Female dorsal (left) and ventral views

Scientific classification
- Domain: Eukaryota
- Kingdom: Animalia
- Phylum: Arthropoda
- Class: Insecta
- Order: Lepidoptera
- Superfamily: Noctuoidea
- Family: Notodontidae
- Genus: Symmerista
- Species: S. luisdiegogomezi

Binomial name
- Symmerista luisdiegogomezi Chacón, 2014

= Symmerista luisdiegogomezi =

Species of moth

Symmerista luisdiegogomezi is a moth in the family Notodontidae first described by Isidro A. Chacón in 2014. It has been collected between 2,450 and 2,600 meters in highland cloud forests dominated by Quercus trees in the foothills west of the Cordillera de Talamanca in southern Costa Rica.

The length of the forewings is 17.2–19.21 mm for males and 20.22–21.51 mm for females. The ground colour of the forewings of the males is dark brown, with a reniform black spot and a light brown basal band. The hindwings are dark brown. The forewings of the females are also dark brown with a beige antemedial band, lined on both sides by sinuous dark brown lines and with an irregular white thin bar from the apex to the black reniform spot. The hindwings are dirty beige with a light brown postmedial line and black discal spot.

== Etymology ==
The species is named in honour of the late Professor Luis Diego Gómez Pignataro of San Jose.
