= Dognina veltini =

Scientific classification
- Domain: Eukaryota
- Kingdom: Animalia
- Phylum: Arthropoda
- Class: Insecta
- Order: Lepidoptera
- Superfamily: Noctuoidea
- Family: Notodontidae
- Genus: Dognina
- Species: D. veltini

Binomial name
- Dognina veltini (Dognin, 1890)

Synonyms
- Lirimiris veltini Dognin, 1890

Species of moth

Dognina veltini is a moth of the family Notodontidae. It has been recorded from Costa Rica south to Bolivia.
