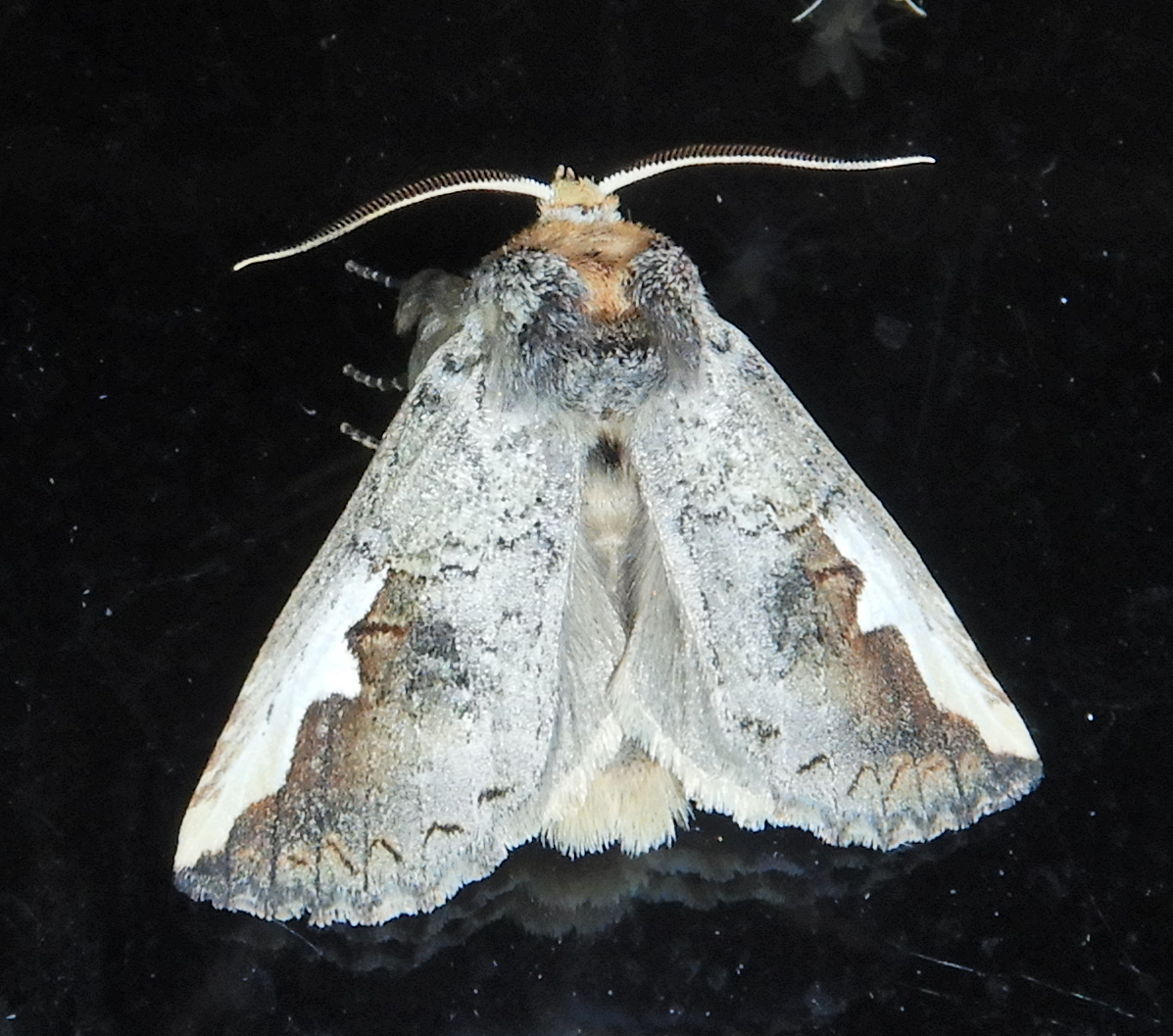

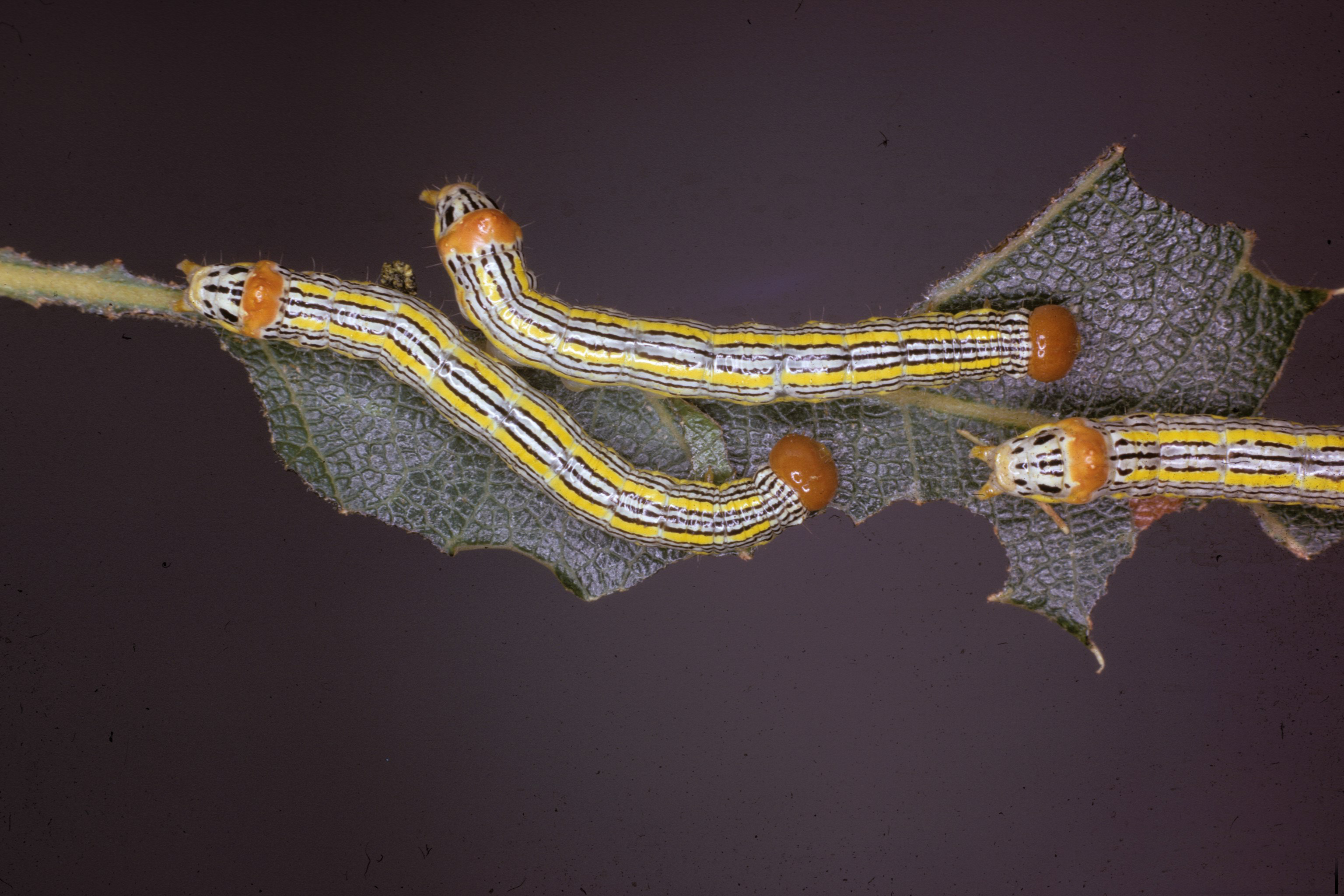
- Adult (top) and larva (bottom)

Scientific classification
- Kingdom: Animalia
- Phylum: Arthropoda
- Clade: Pancrustacea
- Class: Insecta
- Order: Lepidoptera
- Superfamily: Noctuoidea
- Family: Notodontidae
- Genus: Symmerista
- Species: S. leucitys

Binomial name
- Symmerista leucitys Franclemont, 1946

= Symmerista leucitys =

Species of moth

Symmerista leucitys, commonly known as the orange-humped mapleworm moth, is a species of moth in the family Notodontidae. It is found in North America, from southern Canada and the northern half of the United States east of the Great Plains.

The wingspan is about 35 mm. There is one generation per year.

The larvae feed on Acer species.
