= Hippias (disambiguation) =

Hippias was an ancient Greek sophist.

Hippias may also refer to:

- Hippias (tyrant), tyrant of Athens, son of Peisistratos
- Hippias Major and Hippias Minor, works by Plato
- a fictional character in The Crown of Violet, a novel by Geoffrey Trease

== See also ==
- Hippia (disambiguation)
