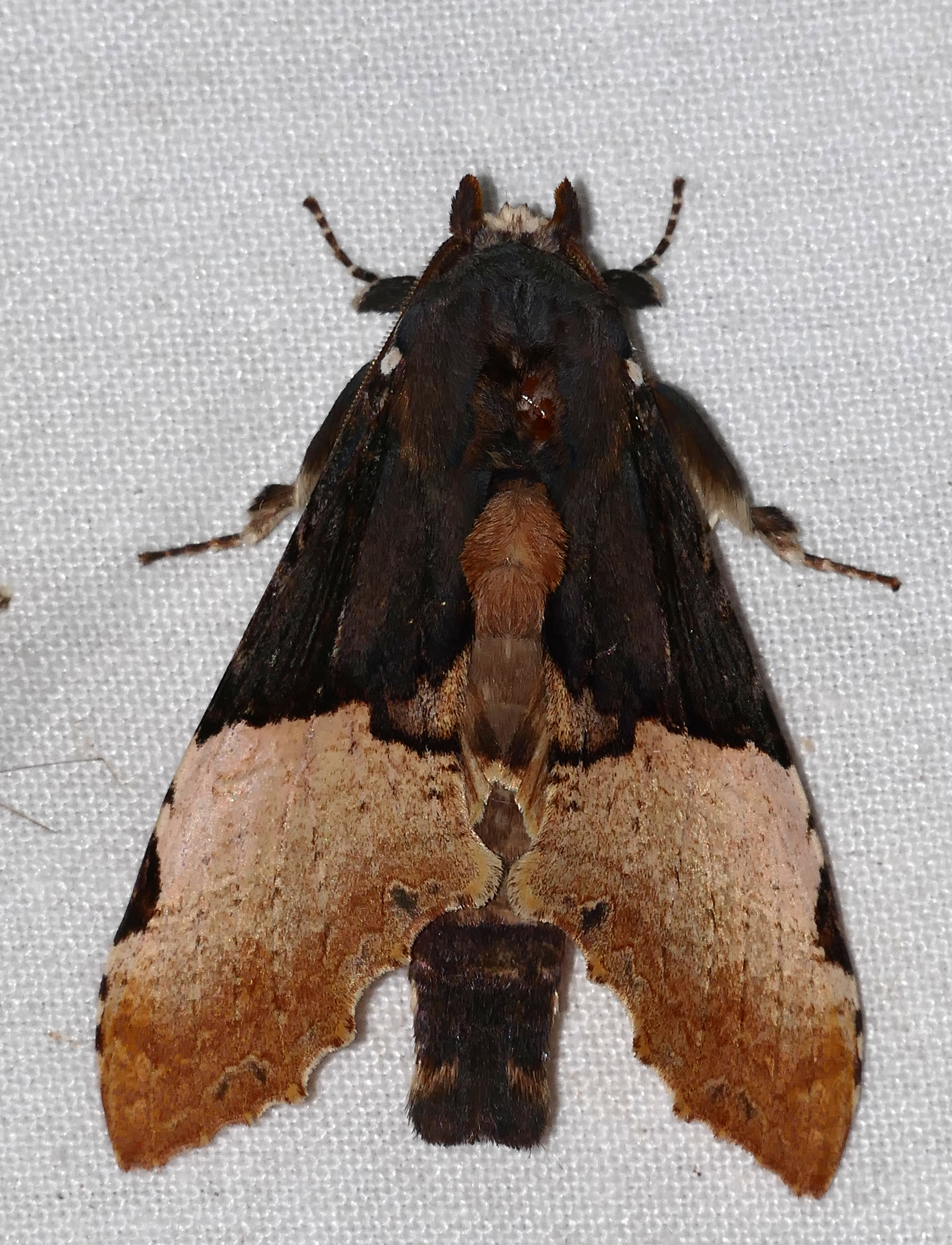
- Nystalea severina

Scientific classification
- Kingdom: Animalia
- Phylum: Arthropoda
- Class: Insecta
- Order: Lepidoptera
- Superfamily: Noctuoidea
- Family: Notodontidae
- Subfamily: Nystaleinae
- Genus: Nystalea; Guenée, 1852

= Nystalea =

Genus of moths

Nystalea is a genus of moths of the family Notodontidae erected by Achille Guenée in 1852.

== Selected Species ==
- Nystalea indiana Grote, 1884
- Nystalea collaris Schaus, 1910
- Nystalea eutalanta Dyar, 1921
- Nystalea ebalea (Stoll, [1780])
- Nystalea nyseus (Cramer, 1775)
- Nystalea congrua (Dyar, 1908)
- Nystalea aequipars Walker, 1858
- Nystalea superciliosa Guenée, 1852
- Nystalea guttiplena Walker, 1857
- Nystalea inchoans Walker, 1857
- Nystalea attenuata Walker, 1858
- Nystalea seminivea (Walker, 1869)
- Nystalea ocellata Walker, 1865
