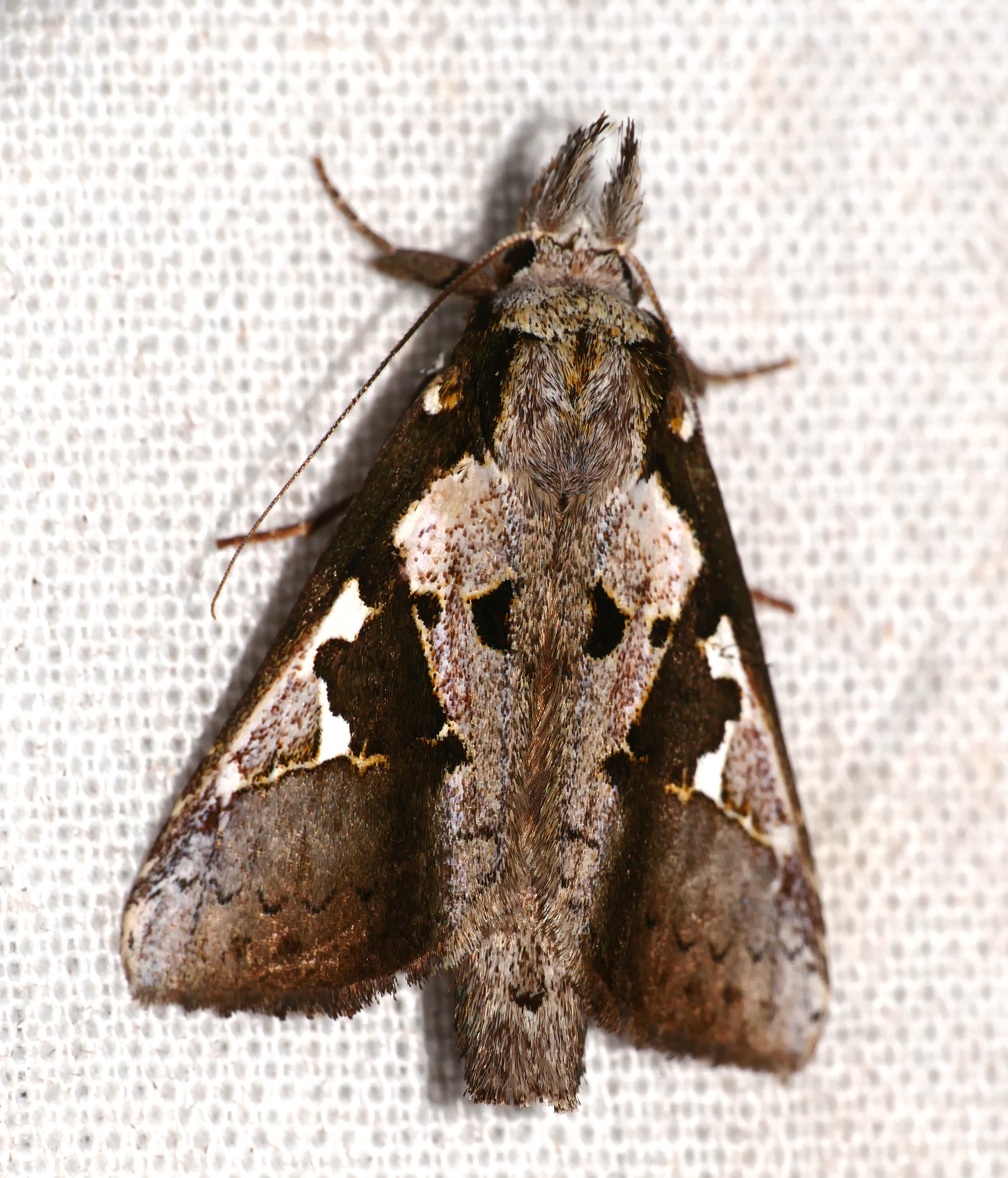
- Ankale maltha

Scientific classification
- Kingdom: Animalia
- Phylum: Arthropoda
- Clade: Pancrustacea
- Class: Insecta
- Order: Lepidoptera
- Superfamily: Noctuoidea
- Family: Notodontidae
- Subfamily: Nystaleinae; Forbes, 1948

= Nystaleinae =

Subfamily of moths

Nystaleinae is a subfamily of moths in the family Notodontidae. The subfamily was described by William Trowbridge Merrifield Forbes in 1948.

== Diversity ==
The subfamily Nystaleinae contains approximately 300 species.

== Distribution ==
The subfamily is restricted almost entirely to the Neotropics, with a few species extending as far north as Canada.

== Genera ==
- Ankale Weller, 1992
- Antiopha Schaus, 1901
- Bahaia Dyar, 1924
- Bardaxima Walker, 1858
- Calledema Butler, 1875
- Dasylophia Packard, 1864
- Didugua Druce, 1891
- Dunama Schaus, 1912
- Elasmia Möschler, 1886
- Elymiotis Walker, 1857
- Euharpyia Schaus, 1901
- Euxoga Möschler, 1878
- Gopha Walker, 1862
- Hippia Möschler, 1878
- Kryptokalos Weller, 1992
- Lepasta Möschler, 1878
- Lusura Walker, 1855
- Lyricinus Weller, 1992
- Lysana Möschler, 1883
- Marthula Walker, 1856
- Navarcostes Schaus, 1905
- Notela Schaus, 1901
- Notoplusia Schaus, 1901
- Nystalea Guenée, 1852
- Phedosia Möschler, 1878
- Phyllopalpia Draudt, 1932
- Poresta Schaus, 1901
- Strophocerus Möschler, 1883
- Pentobesa Schaus, 1901
- Schausiplusia Thiaucourt, 1995
- Symmerista Hübner, 1821
