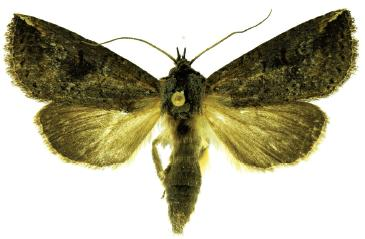
- Male
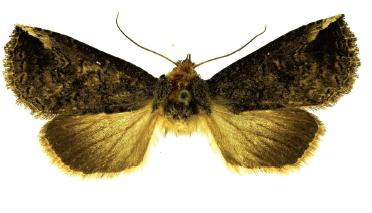
- Female

Scientific classification
- Domain: Eukaryota
- Kingdom: Animalia
- Phylum: Arthropoda
- Class: Insecta
- Order: Lepidoptera
- Superfamily: Noctuoidea
- Family: Notodontidae
- Genus: Elasmia
- Species: E. cave

Binomial name
- Elasmia cave Metzler, 2011

= Elasmia cave =

Species of moth

Elasmia cave is a species of moth of the family Notodontidae. It occurs in New Mexico, and Texas, United States, and possibly Mexico. Adults are on wing from April to early October.

== Etymology ==
CAVE is the acronym, used by the U.S. National Park Service for Carlsbad Caverns National Park. The specific name of this species, cave, refers to the type locality, Carlsbad Caverns National Park.
