= Symmerista zacualpana =

Scientific classification
- Domain: Eukaryota
- Kingdom: Animalia
- Phylum: Arthropoda
- Class: Insecta
- Order: Lepidoptera
- Superfamily: Noctuoidea
- Family: Notodontidae
- Genus: Symmerista
- Species: S. zacualpana

Binomial name
- Symmerista zacualpana (Draudt, 1932)

Species of moth

Symmerista zacualpana is a species of moth in the family Notodontidae (the prominents). It was first described by Max Wilhelm Karl Draudt in 1932 and it is found in North America.

The MONA or Hodges number for Symmerista zacualpana is 7955.
