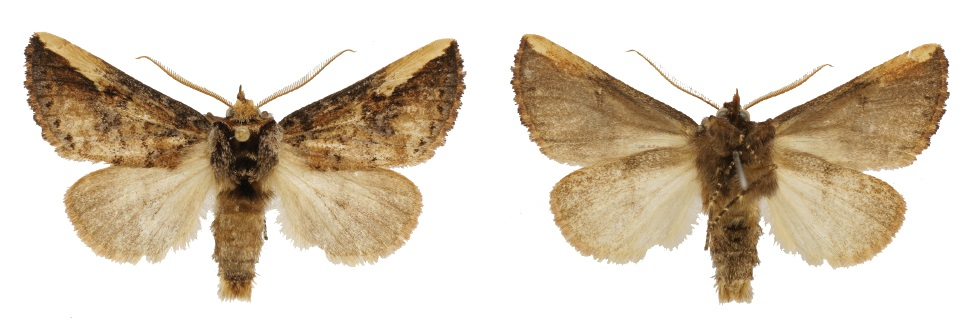
- Male dorsal (left) and ventral views

Scientific classification
- Domain: Eukaryota
- Kingdom: Animalia
- Phylum: Arthropoda
- Class: Insecta
- Order: Lepidoptera
- Superfamily: Noctuoidea
- Family: Notodontidae
- Genus: Symmerista
- Species: S. inbioi

Binomial name
- Symmerista inbioi Chacón, 2014

= Symmerista inbioi =

Species of moth

Symmerista inbioi is a moth in the family Notodontidae first described by Isidro A. Chacón in 2014. It has been collected between 1,250 and 2,700 meters in highland cloud forests of the Cordillera de Talamanca in Costa Rica.

The length of the forewings 16.42–19.44 mm. The ground colour of the forewings is light brown with a black reniform spot. There is a uniform, long, thin, creamy-white band from the reniform spot to the apex and the costal margin is black. The hindwings are dirty beige.

== Etymology ==
The species is named for the Instituto Nacional de Biodiversidad (INBio) in recognition of its 25 years of support for developing an understanding of the biodiversity of Costa Rica and exporting that understanding to the nation and the world.
