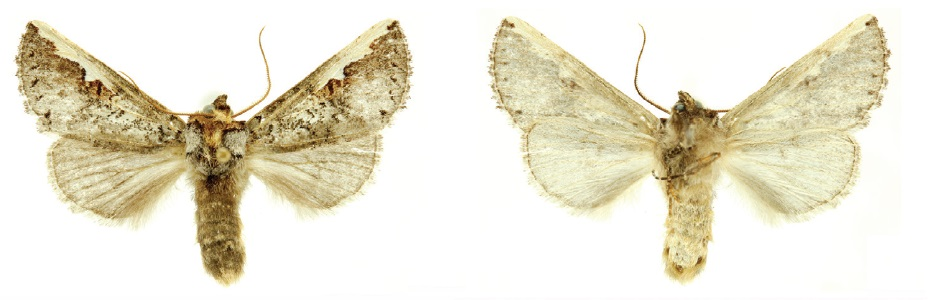
- Male dorsal (left) and ventral views
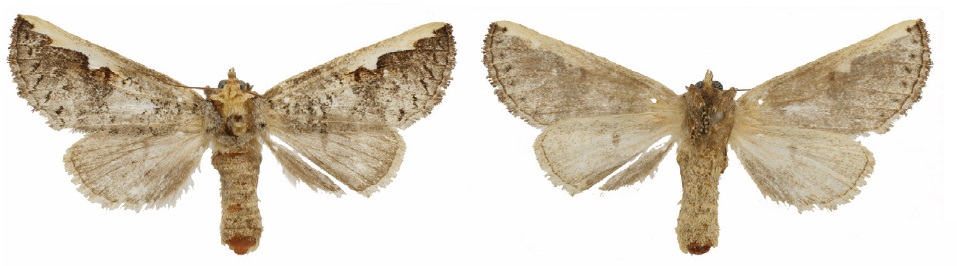
- Female dorsal (left) and ventral views

Scientific classification
- Domain: Eukaryota
- Kingdom: Animalia
- Phylum: Arthropoda
- Class: Insecta
- Order: Lepidoptera
- Superfamily: Noctuoidea
- Family: Notodontidae
- Genus: Symmerista
- Species: S. aura

Binomial name
- Symmerista aura Chacón, 2014

= Symmerista aura =

Species of moth

Symmerista aura is a moth in the family Notodontidae first described by Isidro A. Chacón in 2014. It has been collected between 1,000 and 1,400 meters on both slopes of the Cordillera de Talamanca in Costa Rica.

The length of the forewings 16.26–17.32 mm for males and 20.22–21.51 mm for females. The ground colour of the forewings of the males is light grey with a white-cream mark from the discal cell to the apex. The costal margin is beige and the subterminal line is black. The hindwings are light grey. The females have light grey forewings with a white-cream mark from the discal cell to the apex. The costal margin is beige and the subterminal line is black. The hindwings are light grey.

== Etymology ==
The species is named for Aura Chacón, the daughter of the author.
