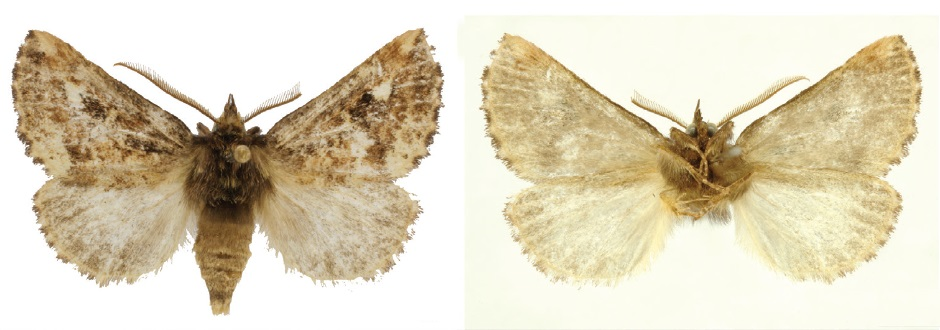
- Male dorsal (left) and ventral views
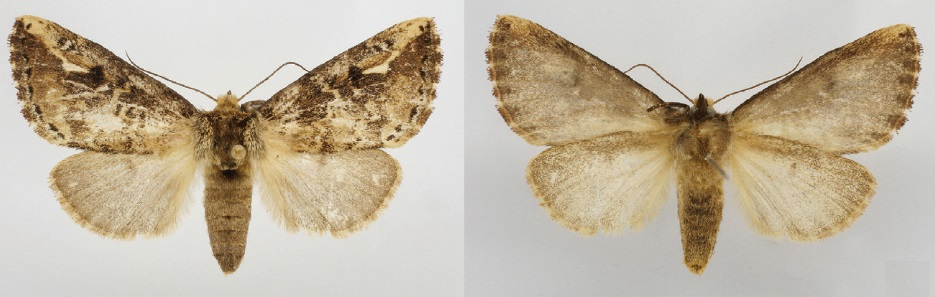
- Female dorsal (left) and ventral views

Scientific classification
- Domain: Eukaryota
- Kingdom: Animalia
- Phylum: Arthropoda
- Class: Insecta
- Order: Lepidoptera
- Superfamily: Noctuoidea
- Family: Notodontidae
- Genus: Symmerista
- Species: S. minaei

Binomial name
- Symmerista minaei Chacón, 2014

= Symmerista minaei =

Species of moth

Symmerista minaei is a moth in the family Notodontidae first described by Isidro A. Chacón in 2014. It has been collected at between 2,400 and 2,600 meters in highland cloud forests of the Cordillera de Talamanca in Costa Rica.

The length of the forewings 17.2–19.21 mm for males and 19.63–21.18 mm for females. The ground colour of the forewings of the males is beige and light brown, with a black reniform spot and light brown basal band. The postmedial band is light brown and there is a creamy-white square distal to the reniform spot. The hindwings are beige. The forewings of the females are dark brown with a beige antemedial band lined at both sides by sinuous dirty dark brown lines. There is a black reniform spot and an irregular thin white to beige line extending from the apex to the reniform spot. The hindwings are dirty beige.

== Etymology ==
The species is named for the Ministerio del Ambiente y Energía (MINAE) of the government of Costa Rica in recognition of its 28 years of continuous and widespread support for the survival and conservation of the wild biodiversity of Costa Rica.
