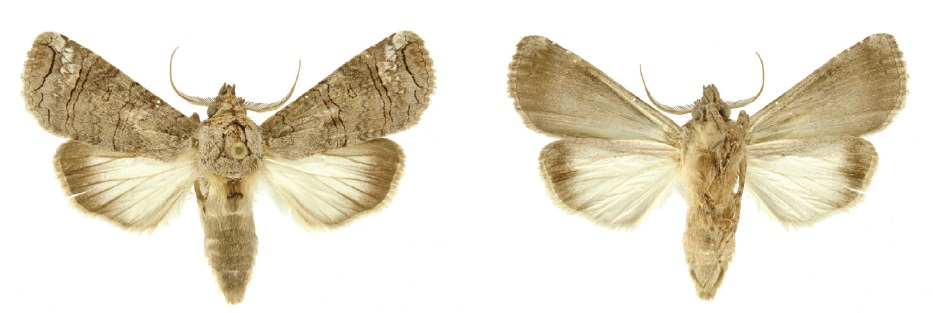
- Elymiotis tlotzin

Scientific classification
- Kingdom: Animalia
- Phylum: Arthropoda
- Class: Insecta
- Order: Lepidoptera
- Superfamily: Noctuoidea
- Family: Notodontidae
- Subfamily: Nystaleinae
- Genus: Elymiotis; Walker, 1857

= Elymiotis =

Genus of moths

Elymiotis is a genus of moths of the family Notodontidae erected by Francis Walker in 1857.

== Species ==
- Elymiotis notodontoides Walker, 1857
- Elymiotis tlotzin (Schaus, 1892)
