= Symmerista canicosta =

Scientific classification
- Domain: Eukaryota
- Kingdom: Animalia
- Phylum: Arthropoda
- Class: Insecta
- Order: Lepidoptera
- Superfamily: Noctuoidea
- Family: Notodontidae
- Genus: Symmerista
- Species: S. canicosta

Binomial name
- Symmerista canicosta Franclemont, 1946

Species of moth

Symmerista canicosta, the red-humped oakworm moth, is a species of moth of the family Notodontidae. It is found from southern Canada to North Carolina, South Carolina and Mississippi.

The wingspan is about 35 mm.

== Gallery ==
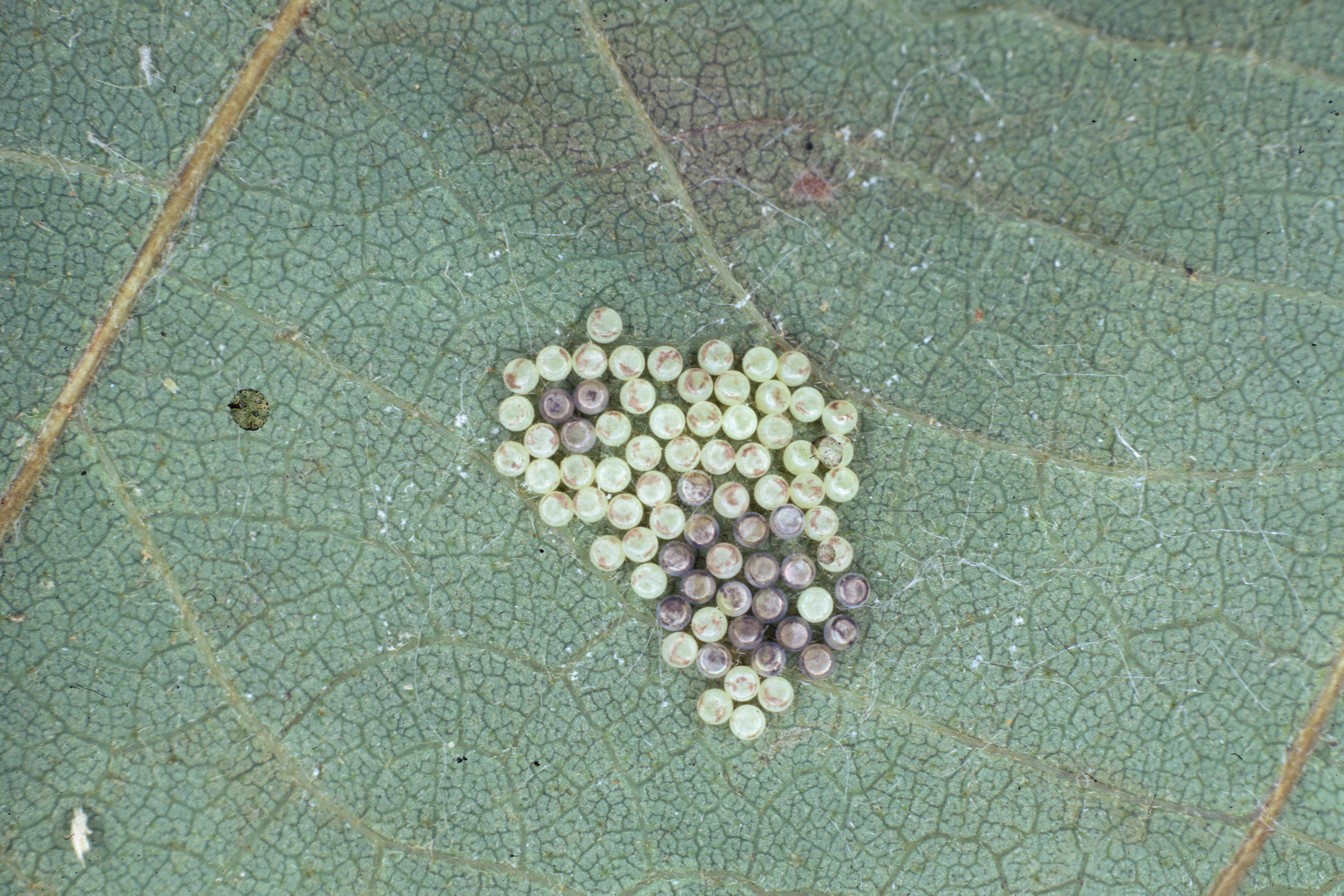
Egg

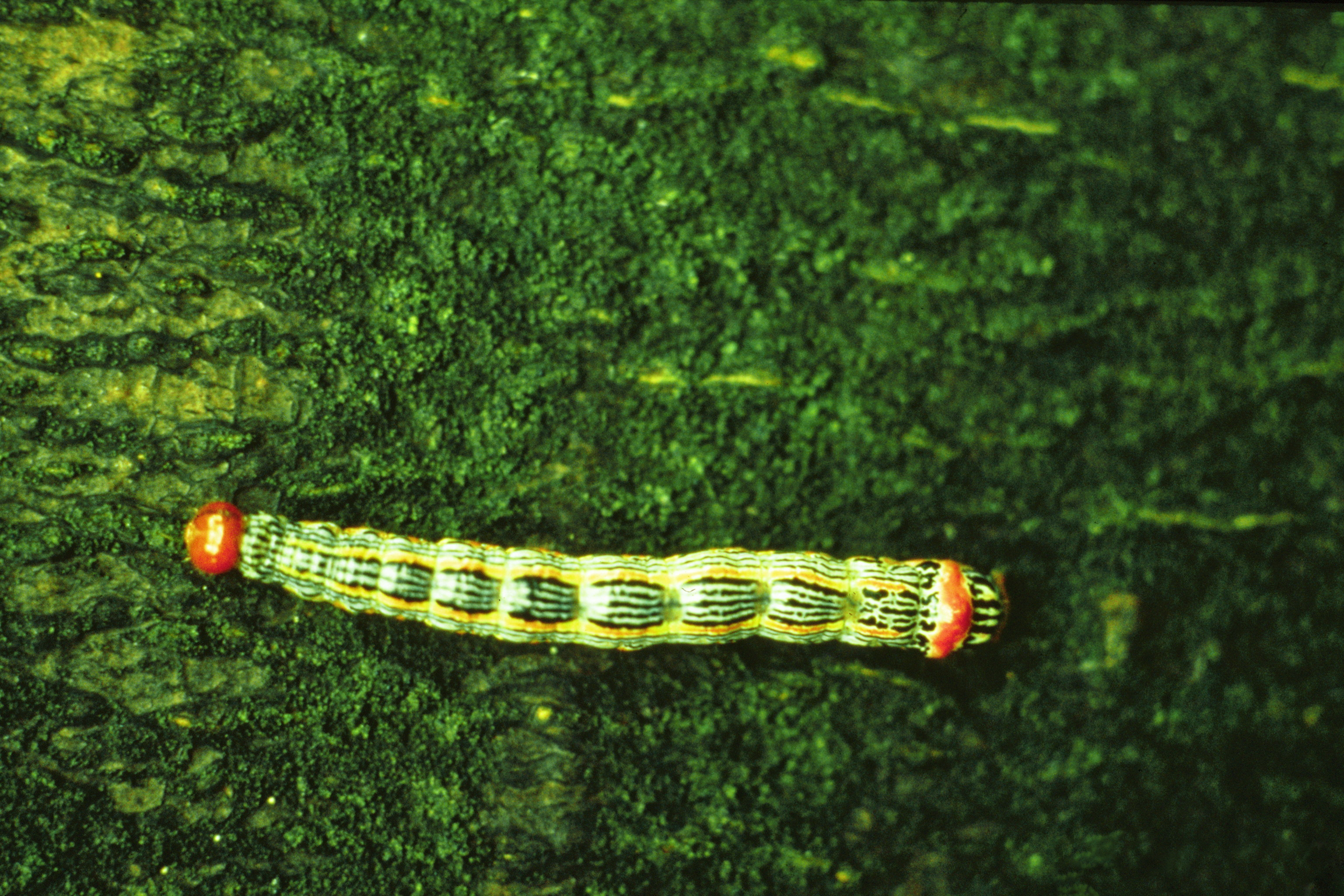
Larva
