= Elymiotis notodontoides =

Scientific classification
- Kingdom: Animalia
- Phylum: Arthropoda
- Class: Insecta
- Order: Lepidoptera
- Superfamily: Noctuoidea
- Family: Notodontidae
- Genus: Elymiotis
- Species: E. notodontoides

Binomial name
- Elymiotis notodontoides Walker, 1857

Species of moth

Elymiotis notodontoides, the glossy prominent, is a species of moth in the family Notodontidae (the prominents). It was first described by Francis Walker in 1857 and it is found in North America.

The MONA or Hodges number for Elymiotis notodontoides is 7948.
