= Dognina honeyi =

Scientific classification
- Domain: Eukaryota
- Kingdom: Animalia
- Phylum: Arthropoda
- Class: Insecta
- Order: Lepidoptera
- Superfamily: Noctuoidea
- Family: Notodontidae
- Genus: Dognina
- Species: D. honeyi

Binomial name
- Dognina honeyi Miller, 2011

Species of moth

Dognina honeyi is a moth of the family Notodontidae. It is found in north-eastern Ecuador.

The length of the forewings is 17.5–21 mm.
