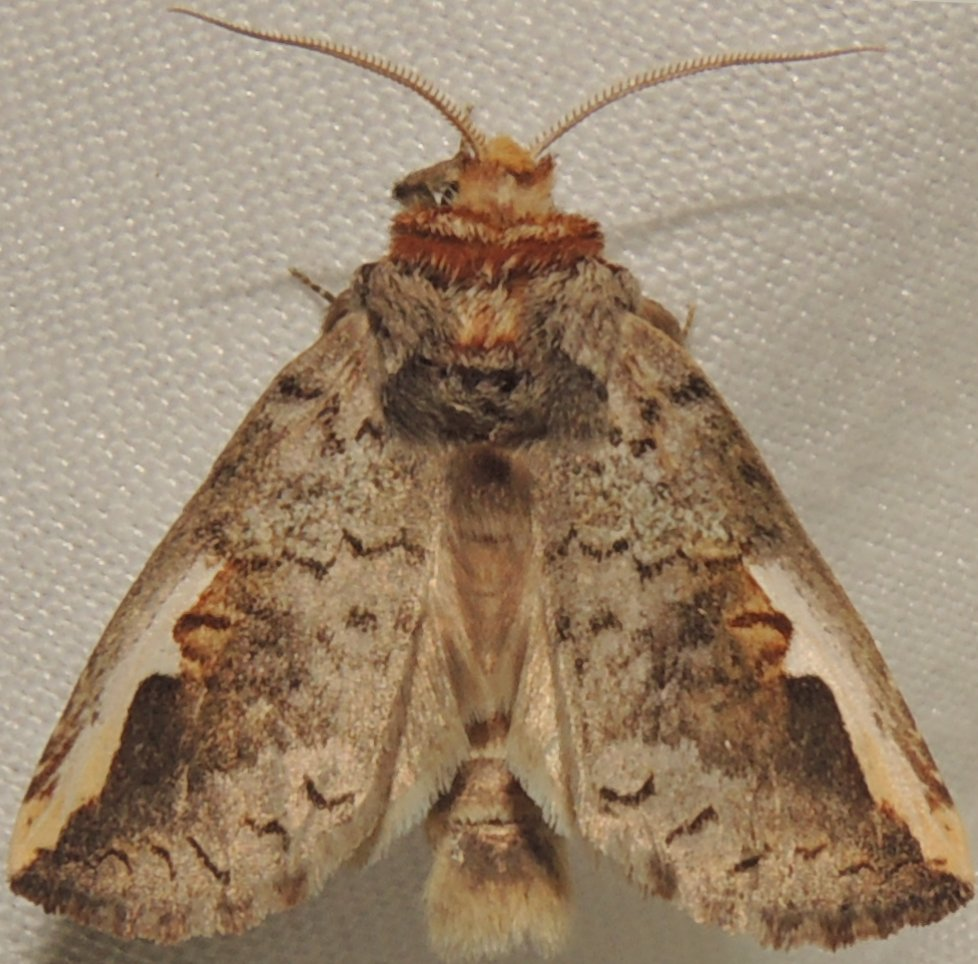

Scientific classification
- Domain: Eukaryota
- Kingdom: Animalia
- Phylum: Arthropoda
- Class: Insecta
- Order: Lepidoptera
- Superfamily: Noctuoidea
- Family: Notodontidae
- Genus: Symmerista
- Species: S. albifrons

Binomial name
- Symmerista albifrons (J. E. Smith, 1797)

= Symmerista albifrons =

Species of moth

Symmerista albifrons, the white-headed prominent or orange-humped oakworm, is a species of moth in the family Notodontidae (the prominents). It was first described by J. E. Smith in 1797 and it is found in North America.

The MONA or Hodges number for Symmerista albifrons is 7951.

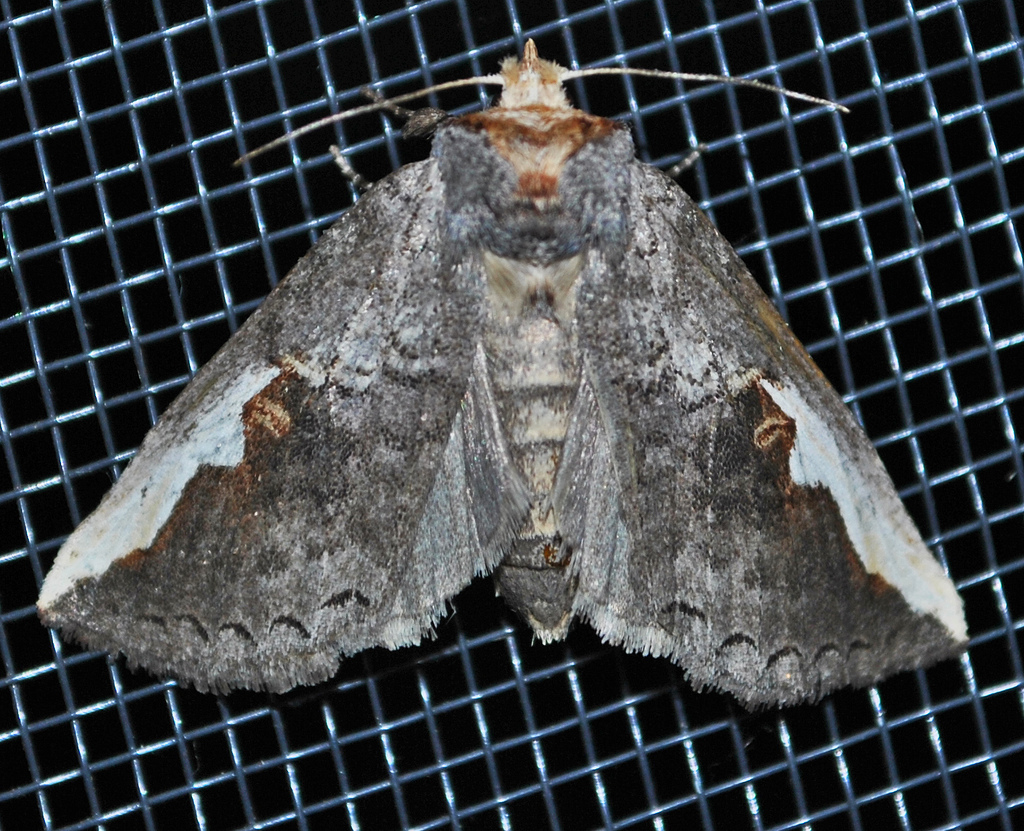
