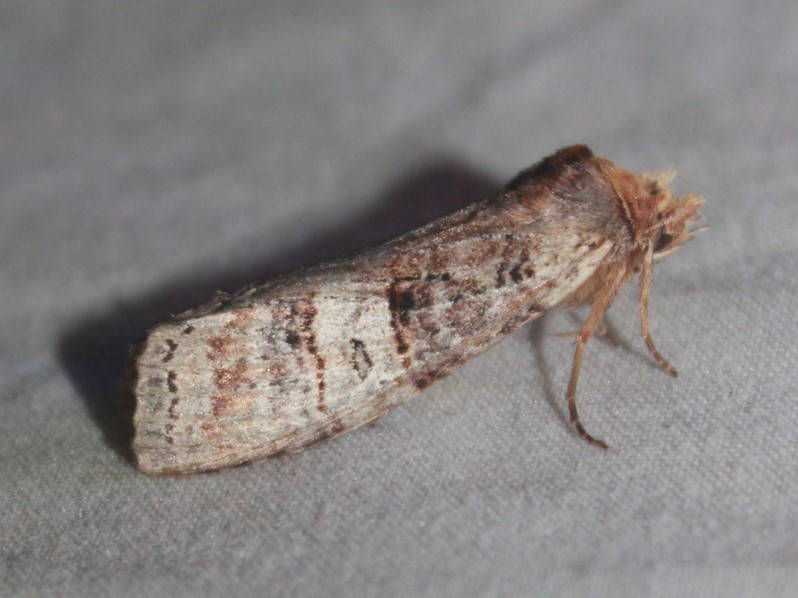

Scientific classification
- Kingdom: Animalia
- Phylum: Arthropoda
- Clade: Pancrustacea
- Class: Insecta
- Order: Lepidoptera
- Superfamily: Noctuoidea
- Family: Notodontidae
- Genus: Nystalea
- Species: N. indiana

Binomial name
- Nystalea indiana Grote, 1884

= Nystalea indiana =

Species of moth

Nystalea indiana, commonly known as Grote's tropical prominent moth, is a species of prominent moth in the family Notodontidae. It was described by Augustus Radcliffe Grote in 1884 and is found in North America.
