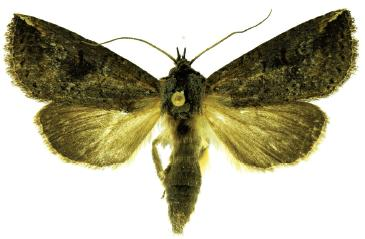
- Male Elasmia cave

Scientific classification
- Domain: Eukaryota
- Kingdom: Animalia
- Phylum: Arthropoda
- Class: Insecta
- Order: Lepidoptera
- Superfamily: Noctuoidea
- Family: Notodontidae
- Subfamily: Nystaleinae
- Genus: Elasmia; Möschler, 1886

= Elasmia =

Genus of moths

Elasmia is a genus of moths of the family Notodontidae.

== Species ==
- Elasmia cave Metzler, 2011
- Elasmia insularis (Grote, 1866)
- Elasmia mandela (Druce, 1887)
- Elasmia packardii (Morrison, 1875)
