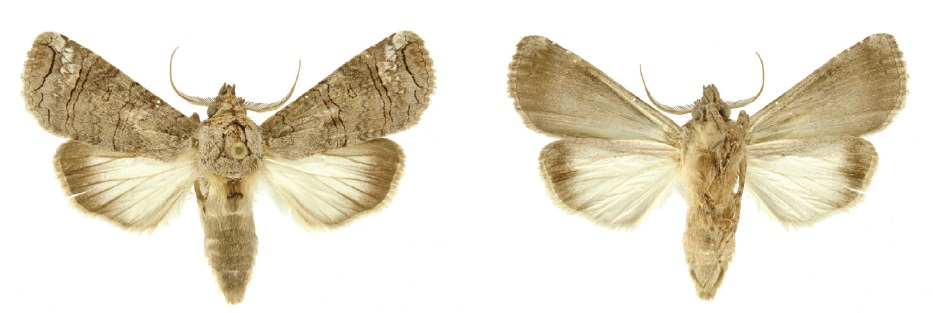
- Male dorsal (left) and ventral views
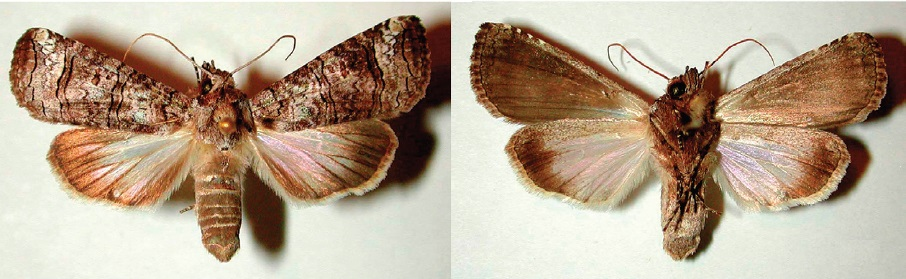
- Female dorsal (left) and ventral views

Scientific classification
- Domain: Eukaryota
- Kingdom: Animalia
- Phylum: Arthropoda
- Class: Insecta
- Order: Lepidoptera
- Superfamily: Noctuoidea
- Family: Notodontidae
- Genus: Elymiotis
- Species: E. tlotzin

Binomial name
- Elymiotis tlotzin (Schaus, 1892)

Synonyms
- Edema tlotzin Schaus, 1892; Symmerista tlotzin

= Elymiotis tlotzin =

Species of moth

Elymiotis tlotzin is a moth in the family Notodontidae first described by William Schaus in 1892. It is found in Costa Rica, where it has been collected in the dry forest ecosystem of Peninsula de Nicoya, and in the dry forests of Sector Santa Rosa and Sector Pailas at elevations between 0 and 800 meters.

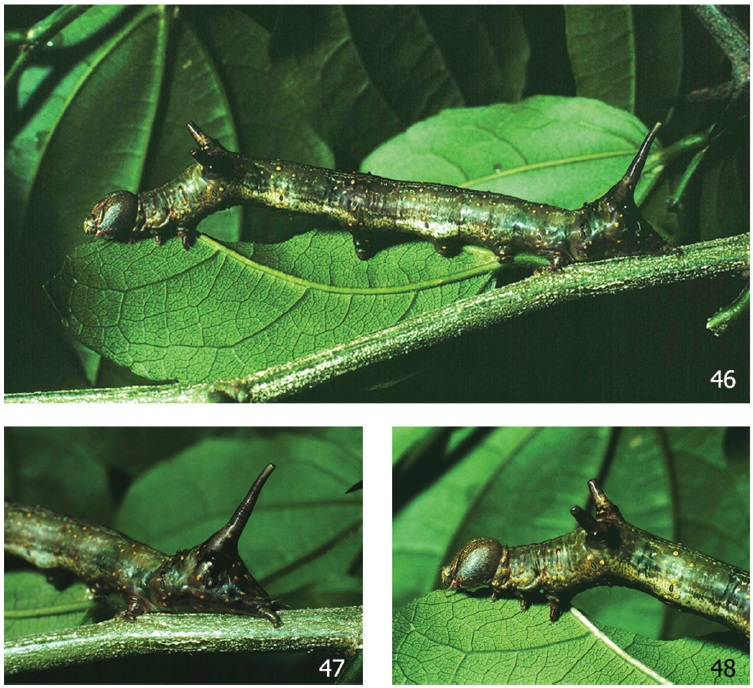
Last instar larva

The length of the forewings 15.42–19.28 mm.

The larvae feed on Zizyphus guatemalensis.
