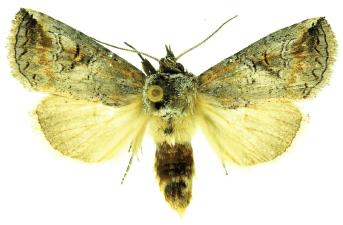
- Male
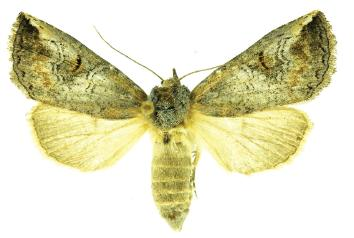
- Female

Scientific classification
- Domain: Eukaryota
- Kingdom: Animalia
- Phylum: Arthropoda
- Class: Insecta
- Order: Lepidoptera
- Superfamily: Noctuoidea
- Family: Notodontidae
- Genus: Elasmia
- Species: E. packardii

Binomial name
- Elasmia packardii (Morrison, 1875)

Synonyms
- Edema packardii Morrison, 1875; Hippia packardii

= Elasmia packardii =

Species of moth

Elasmia packardii is a species of moth of the family Notodontidae. It occurs in Texas, Arizona, New Mexico, Oklahoma, Kansas and Mexico.

The wingspan is 30–41 mm. The overall colour is light grey blue to grey with obscure transverse forewing markings, sometimes showing slight brownish shadings over the reniform spot and in the postmedial and subterminal areas. Males and females are similar in appearance. Adults are on wing from April to early October.

The larvae feed on Ungnadia speciosa and Sapindus saponaria var. drummondii.
