= Lepasta =

Scientific classification
- Kingdom: Animalia
- Phylum: Arthropoda
- Class: Insecta
- Order: Lepidoptera
- Superfamily: Noctuoidea
- Family: Notodontidae
- Genus: Lepasta; Moschler, 1878

Genus of moths

Lepasta is a genus of moths of the family Notodontidae.

== Selected species ==
- Lepasta bractea (Felder, 1874)
- Lepasta grammodes Felder, 1874
- Lepasta majorina Dognin, 1914
