= Lepasta bractea =

Scientific classification
- Kingdom: Animalia
- Phylum: Arthropoda
- Class: Insecta
- Order: Lepidoptera
- Superfamily: Noctuoidea
- Family: Notodontidae
- Genus: Lepasta
- Species: L. bractea

Binomial name
- Lepasta bractea (Felder, 1874)

Synonyms
- Nystalea bractea Felder, 1874

Species of moth

Lepasta bractea is a moth of the family Notodontidae. It is found in Venezuela and Peru.

== Subspecies ==
- Lepasta bractea bractea (Venezuela)
- Lepasta bractea gigantea Rothschild, 1917 (south-eastern Peru)
