= Elasmia insularis =

Scientific classification
- Kingdom: Animalia
- Phylum: Arthropoda
- Class: Insecta
- Order: Lepidoptera
- Superfamily: Noctuoidea
- Family: Notodontidae
- Genus: Elasmia
- Species: E. insularis

Binomial name
- Elasmia insularis (Grote, 1866)

Synonyms
- Edema insularis Grote, 1866; Hippia insularis; Elasmia lignosa Möschler 1886

Species of moth

Elasmia insularis is a species of moth of the family Notodontidae. It is found in Cuba. It has been recorded from Texas, but these are probably misidentifications and the species is not thought to be present in the United States.
