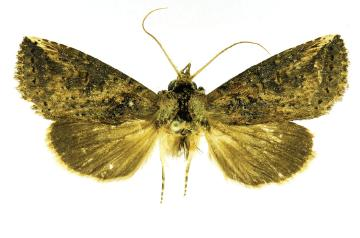
- Male
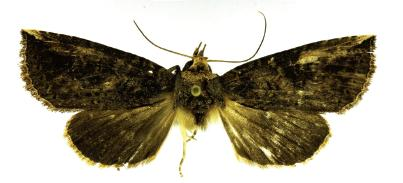
- Female

Scientific classification
- Domain: Eukaryota
- Kingdom: Animalia
- Phylum: Arthropoda
- Class: Insecta
- Order: Lepidoptera
- Superfamily: Noctuoidea
- Family: Notodontidae
- Genus: Elasmia
- Species: E. mandela

Binomial name
- Elasmia mandela (H. Druce, 1887)

Synonyms
- Edema mandela H. Druce, 1887

= Elasmia mandela =

Species of moth

Elasmia mandela is a species of moth of the family Notodontidae first described by Herbert Druce in 1887. It occurs in Mexico, Costa Rica, and the US states of Texas and Oklahoma.

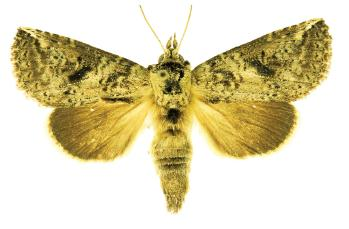
Elasmia mandela santaana male

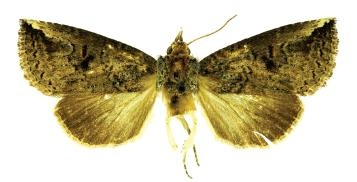
Elasmia mandela santaana female

Overall colour is dark grey brown with obscure transverse forewing markings. Males and females are similar in appearance. Elasmia mandela santaana is grey overall with a contrasting dark scale patch in the reniform/subreniform area. Adults are on wing from April to early October.

The larvae have been recorded feeding on Rhamnaceae and Sapindaceae species, including Unganadia speciosa for subspecies Elasmia mandela santaana.

== Subspecies ==
- Elasmia mandela mandela (Mexico and Costa Rica)
- Elasmia mandela santaana Metzler & Knudson, 2011 (Texas, Oklahoma and probably Mexico)

== Etymology ==
The name of subspecies Elasmia mandela santaana refers to its type locality, the Santa Ana National Wildlife Refuge in Texas.
