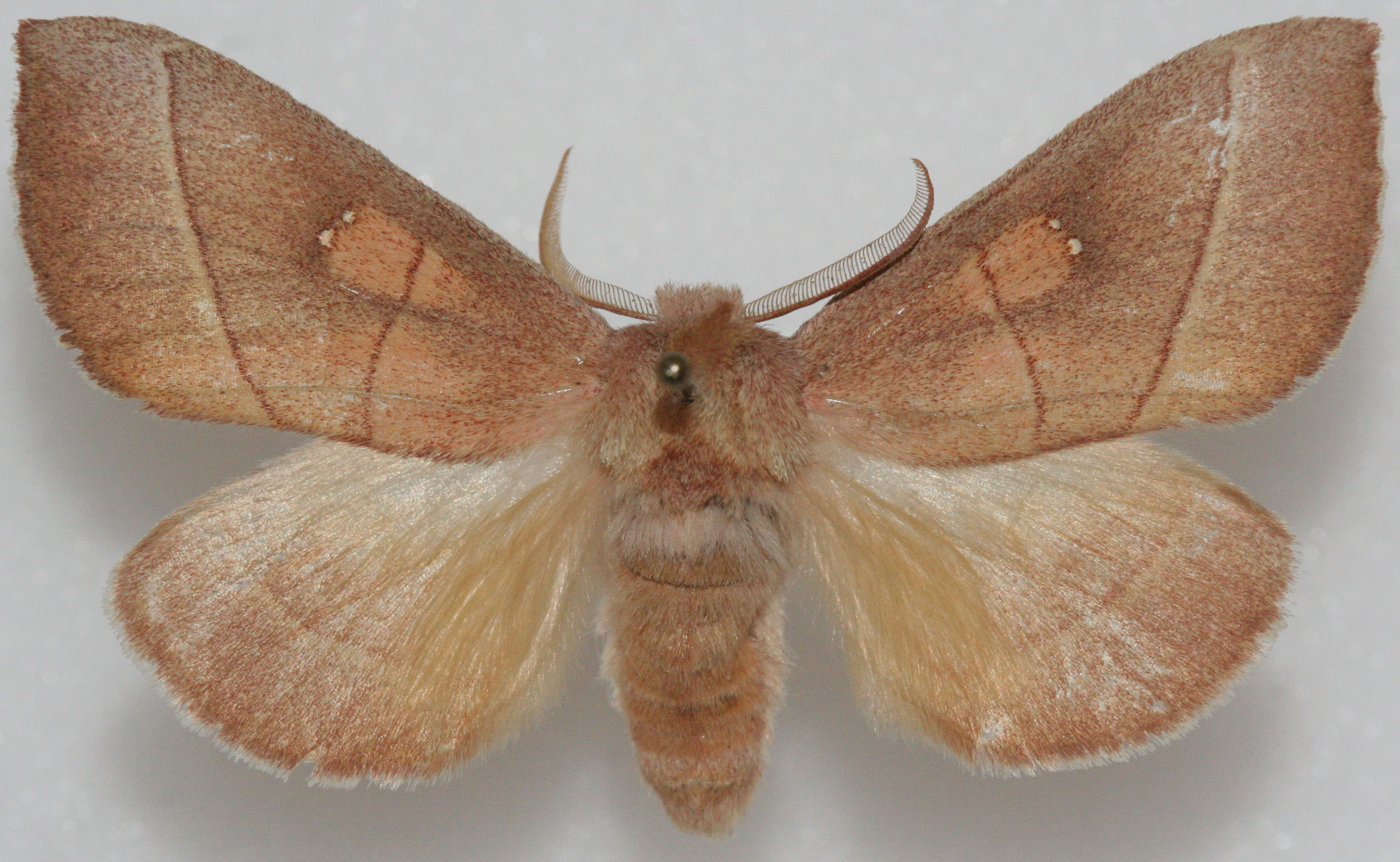
- Nadata gibbosa

Scientific classification
- Kingdom: Animalia
- Phylum: Arthropoda
- Class: Insecta
- Order: Lepidoptera
- Superfamily: Noctuoidea
- Family: Notodontidae
- Subfamily: Phalerinae
- Genus: Nadata; Walker, 1855

= Nadata =

Genus of moths

Nadata is a genus of moths of the family Notodontidae erected by Francis Walker in 1855.

== Species ==
- Nadata gibbosa (J. E. Smith, 1797)
- Nadata oregonensis Butler, 1881
