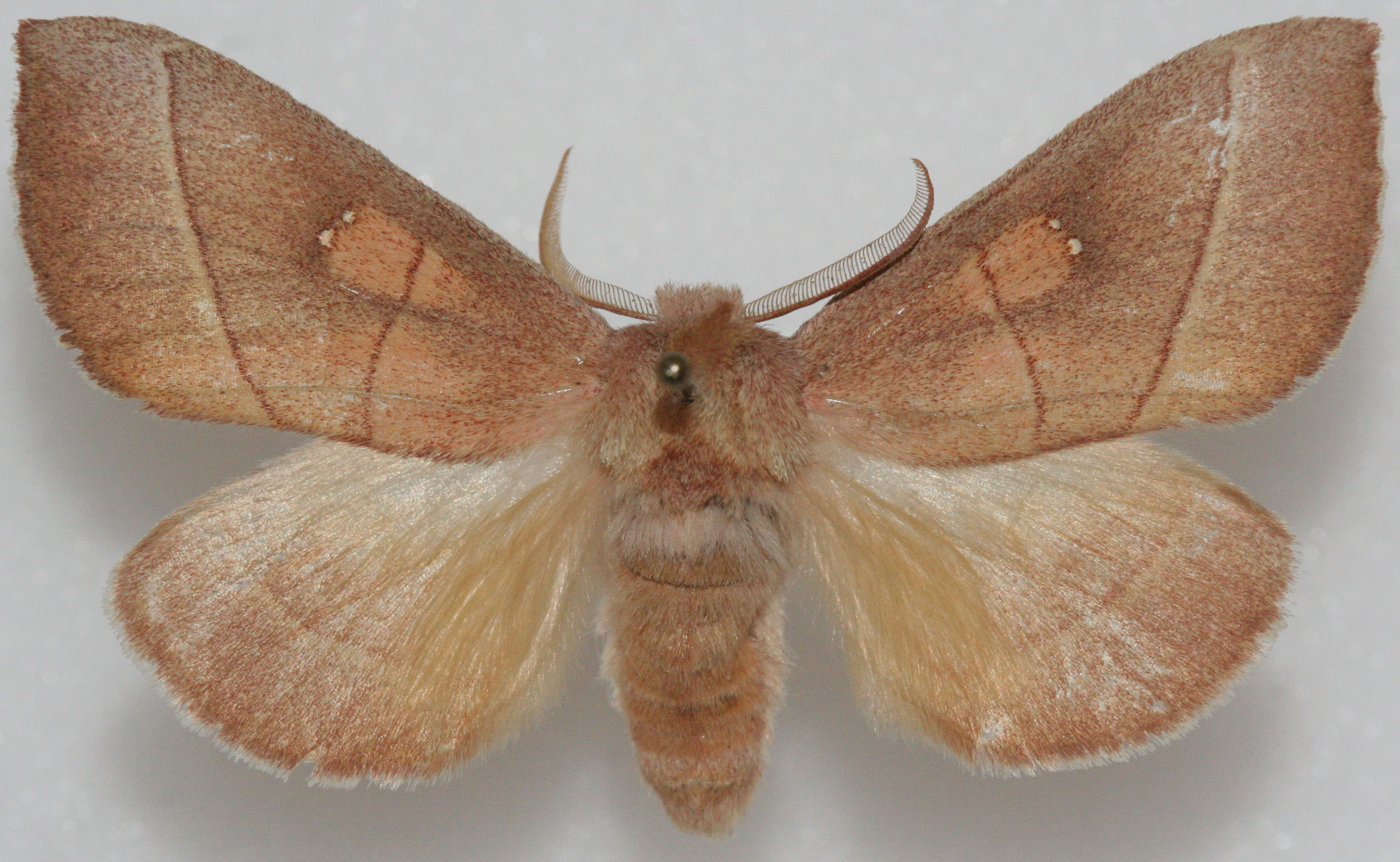

Scientific classification
- Kingdom: Animalia
- Phylum: Arthropoda
- Class: Insecta
- Order: Lepidoptera
- Superfamily: Noctuoidea
- Family: Notodontidae
- Genus: Nadata
- Species: N. gibbosa

Binomial name
- Nadata gibbosa (J. E. Smith, 1797)

= Rough prominent =

Species of moth

The rough prominent (Nadata gibbosa) is a moth of the family Notodontidae, subfamily Phalerinae. It is also known as the white-dotted prominent and the tawny prominent. The species was first described by James Edward Smith in 1797. This common moth is found across North America from the northern boreal forests to as far south as Florida. It is most common in deciduous forests at some elevation. It is nocturnal but attracted to lights. The moths start to fly soon after dusk and return to resting places some time before dawn breaks (Fullard & Napoleone 2001). The adults live through late spring and early summer, and larvae are active until fall. They then pupate until the following spring.

The moth is tan or dull orange, with two small silver spots on each forewing. The wingspan is approximately 2 inches (5 cm). It sports a pointed thoracic tuft between its wings.

== Life cycle ==
=== Larva ===
The larva is blue green, turning bright green as it approaches pupation age. It has a large head capsule, yellow mandibles, and yellow longitudinal stripes down its body. It feeds on the leaves of oaks and other deciduous trees (see list below). The larva is sometimes called the green oak caterpillar.

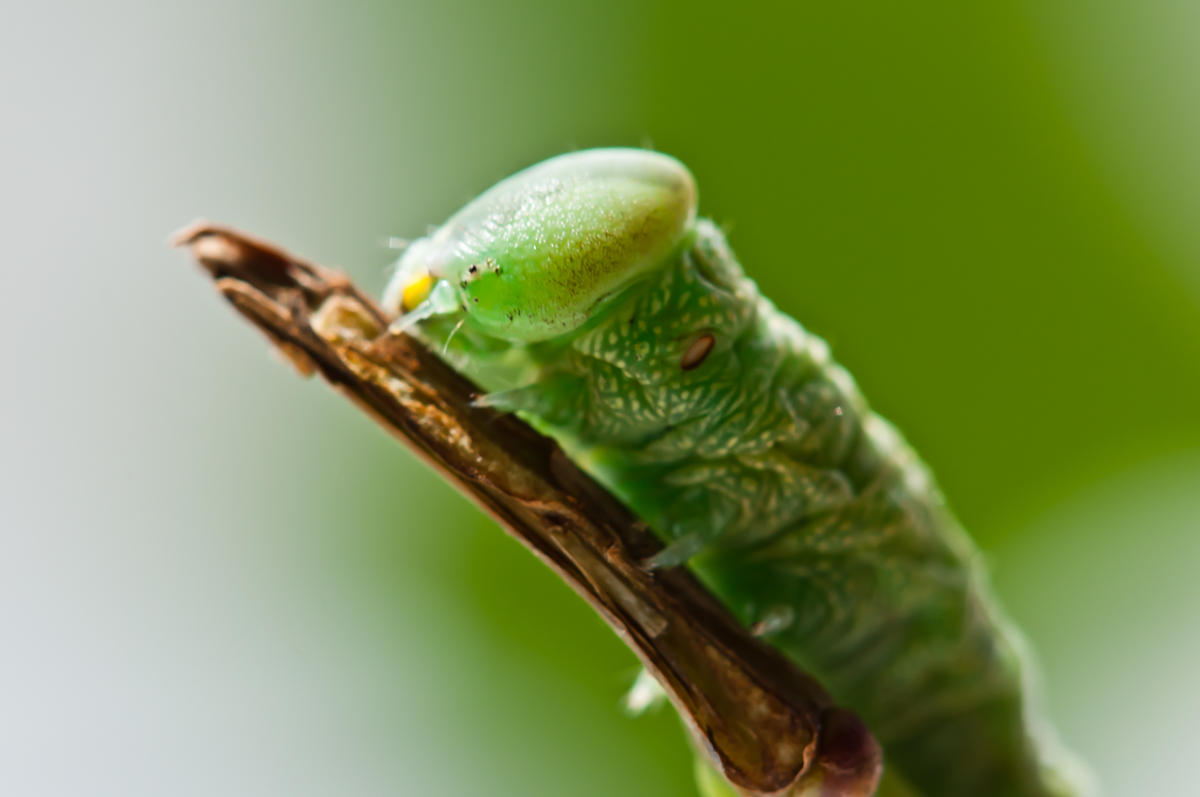

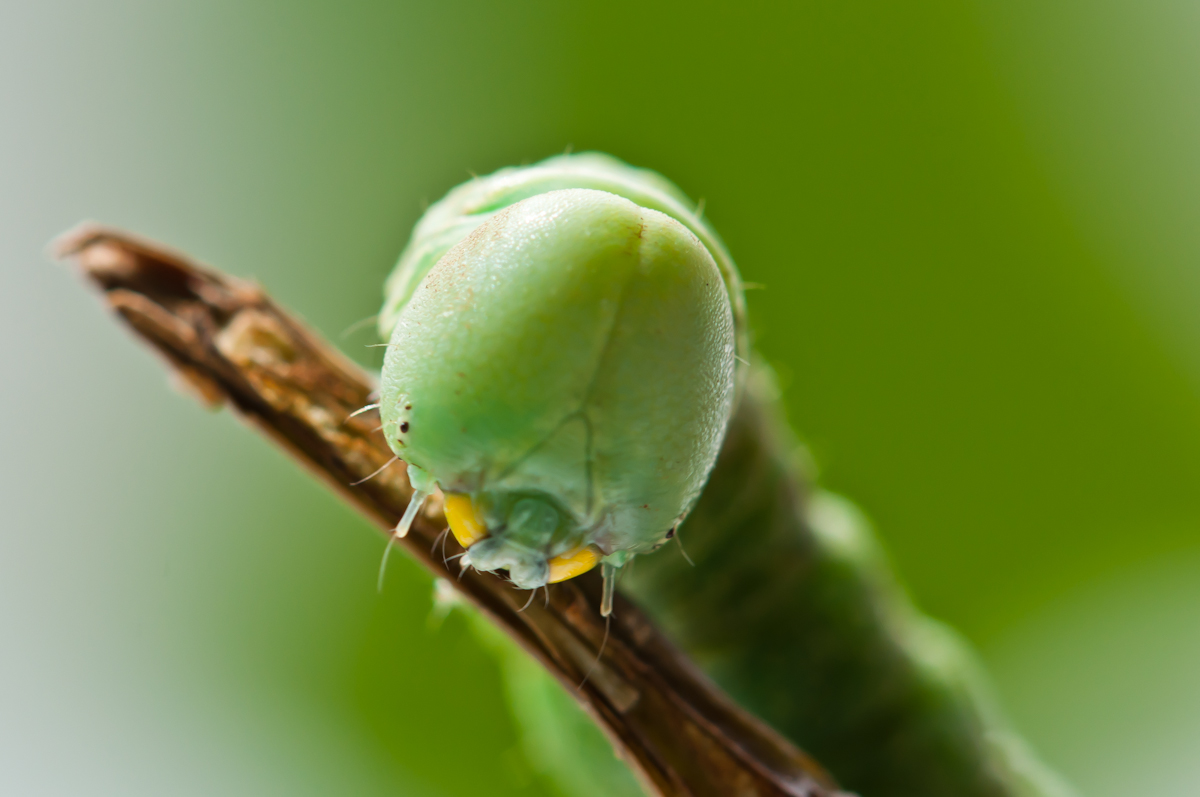

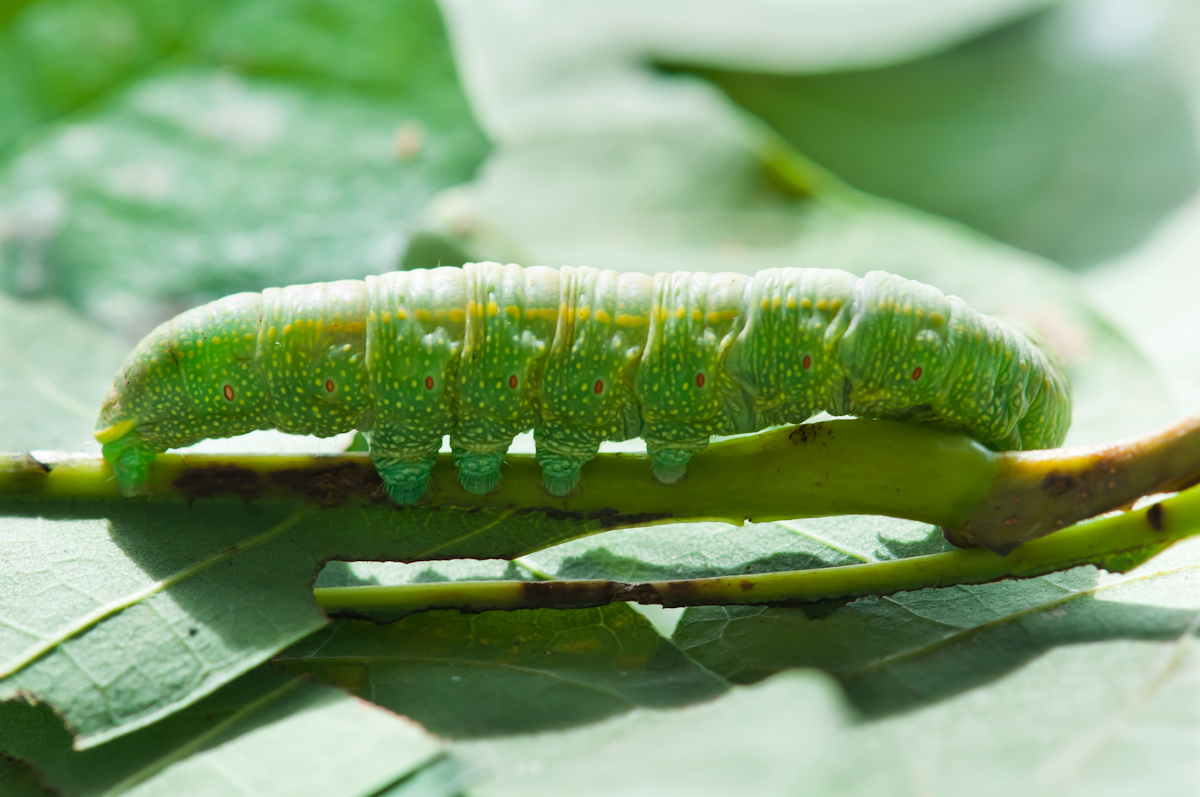

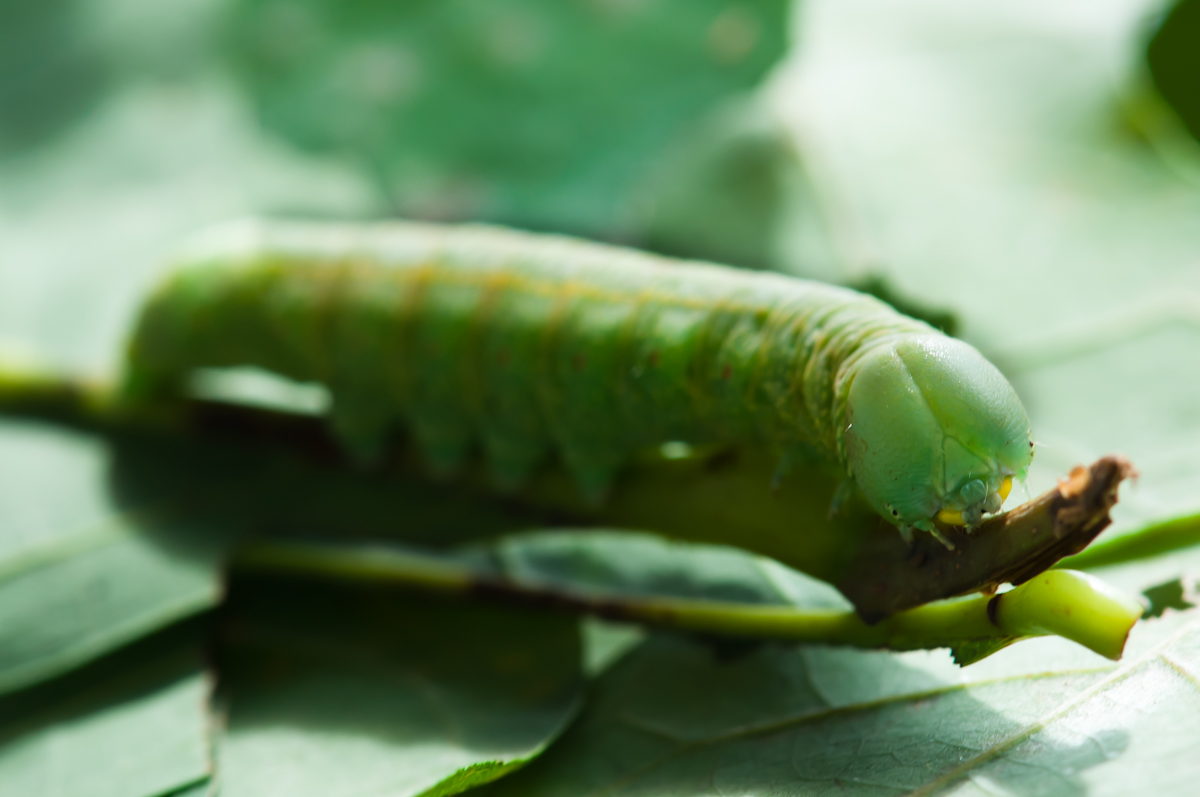

== Recorded food plants ==
- Acer – maple
- Alnus – alder
- Amelanchier
- Betula – birch
- Castanea – chestnut
- Corylus – hazel
- Fagus – beech
- Fraxinus americana – white ash
- Populus – poplar
- Prunus
- Quercus – oak
- Rosa – rose
- Salix – willow
