= Nadata oregonensis =

Scientific classification
- Domain: Eukaryota
- Kingdom: Animalia
- Phylum: Arthropoda
- Class: Insecta
- Order: Lepidoptera
- Superfamily: Noctuoidea
- Family: Notodontidae
- Genus: Nadata
- Species: N. oregonensis

Binomial name
- Nadata oregonensis Butler, 1881

Species of moth

Nadata oregonensis is a species of moth in the family Notodontidae (the prominents). It was first described by Arthur Gardiner Butler in 1881 and it is found in North America.

The MONA or Hodges number for Nadata oregonensis is 7916.
