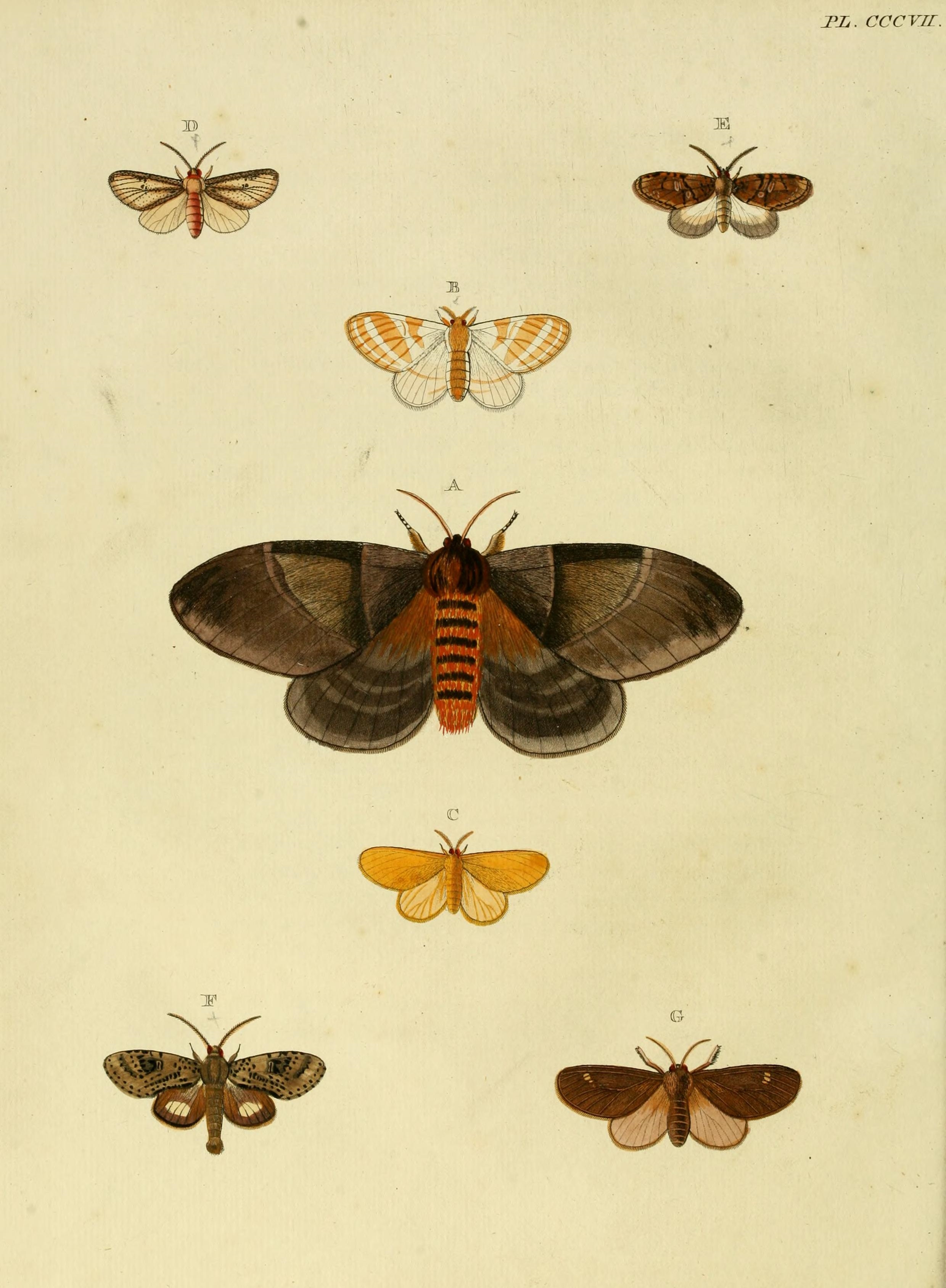

Scientific classification
- Domain: Eukaryota
- Kingdom: Animalia
- Phylum: Arthropoda
- Class: Insecta
- Order: Lepidoptera
- Superfamily: Noctuoidea
- Family: Erebidae
- Subfamily: Arctiinae
- Genus: Purius
- Species: P. pilumnia

Binomial name
- Purius pilumnia (Stoll, [1780])

Synonyms
- Phalaena pilumnia Stoll, [1780]; Purius sordidus Walker, 1855

= Purius pilumnia =

Species of moth

Purius pilumnia is a moth in the family Erebidae. It was described by Stoll in 1780. It is found in Costa Rica, Panama, Venezuela, Suriname, French Guiana and Brazil.
