= Purius superpulverea =

Scientific classification
- Kingdom: Animalia
- Phylum: Arthropoda
- Class: Insecta
- Order: Lepidoptera
- Superfamily: Noctuoidea
- Family: Erebidae
- Subfamily: Arctiinae
- Genus: Purius
- Species: P. superpulverea

Binomial name
- Purius superpulverea (Dyar, 1925)

Synonyms
- Spodarctia superpulverea Dyar, 1925

Species of moth

Purius superpulverea is a moth in the family Erebidae. It was described by Harrison Gray Dyar Jr. in 1925. It is found in Mexico and southern Texas.

Adults have been recorded on wing in March, October and November.
