= Purius =

Scientific classification
- Kingdom: Animalia
- Phylum: Arthropoda
- Class: Insecta
- Order: Lepidoptera
- Superfamily: Noctuoidea
- Family: Erebidae
- Subfamily: Arctiinae
- Subtribe: Phaegopterina
- Genus: Purius; Walker, 1855

Synonyms
- Spodarctia Dyar, 1925

Genus of moths

Purius is a genus of moths in the family Erebidae. The genus was erected by Francis Walker in 1855.

== Species ==
- Purius pilumnia (Stoll, [1780])
- Purius superpulverea (Dyar, 1925)
