= Puerto Rico Highway 194 =

Highway in Puerto Rico

Highway 194
- Ruta 194

Route information
- Maintained by Puerto Rico DTPW
- Length: 4.9 km (3.0 mi)

Major junctions
- South end: PR-3 in Quebrada Vueltas
- PR-195 in Fajardo barrio-pueblo; PR-986 in Quebrada Fajardo–Fajardo barrio-pueblo
- North end: PR-3 / PR-940 in Quebrada Fajardo

Location
- Country: United States
- Territory: Puerto Rico
- Municipalities: Fajardo

Highway system
- Roads in Puerto Rico; List
← PR-193	→ PR-195

Puerto Rico Highway 194 (PR-194) is a road located in Fajardo, Puerto Rico, passing through its downtown. This highway begins at its intersection with PR-3 and PR-53 in Quebrada Vueltas and ends at its junction with PR-3 and PR-940 in Quebrada Fajardo.

== Major intersections ==
The entire route is located in Fajardo.

Location	km	mi	Destinations	Notes
Quebrada Vueltas	4.9	3.0	PR-3 to PR-53 (Autopista Dr. José Celso Barbosa) – Ceiba, Luquillo	Southern terminus of PR-194; roundabout
Fajardo barrio-pueblo	4.0	2.5	PR-Avenida Marcelito Gotay – Fajardo	
Fajardo barrio-pueblo	3.3	2.1	PR-195 – Fajardo, Luquillo, Ceiba	PR-194 southbound access via Calle Luis Muñoz Rivera (PR-195 west)
Fajardo barrio-pueblo	2.0	1.2	PR-Avenida El Conquistador – Fajardo	
Quebrada Fajardo–Fajardo barrio-pueblo line	1.5	0.93	PR-986 (Avenida El Veterano) – Fajardo	
Quebrada Fajardo	0.0	0.0	PR-3 – Luquillo, Ceiba	Northern terminus of PR-194 and eastern terminus of PR-940
Quebrada Fajardo	0.0	0.0	PR-940	Continuation beyond PR-3
1.000 mi = 1.609 km; 1.000 km = 0.621 mi: Incomplete access
