= Puerto Rico Highway 195 =

Highway in Puerto Rico

Highway 195
- Ruta 195

Route information
- Maintained by Puerto Rico DTPW
- Length: 3.3 km (2.1 mi)

Major junctions
- West end: PR-3 in Fajardo barrio-pueblo
- PR-976 in Fajardo barrio-pueblo; PR-986 in Fajardo barrio-pueblo; PR-194 in Fajardo barrio-pueblo; PR-987 in Fajardo barrio-pueblo
- East end: Port of Fajardo in Fajardo barrio-pueblo

Location
- Country: United States
- Territory: Puerto Rico
- Municipalities: Fajardo

Highway system
- Roads in Puerto Rico; List
← PR-194	→ PR-196

Puerto Rico Highway 195 (PR-195) is a road located in Fajardo, Puerto Rico, passing through its downtown. This highway begins at PR-3 west of downtown Fajardo and ends at the Port of Fajardo.

== Major intersections ==
The entire route is located in Fajardo.

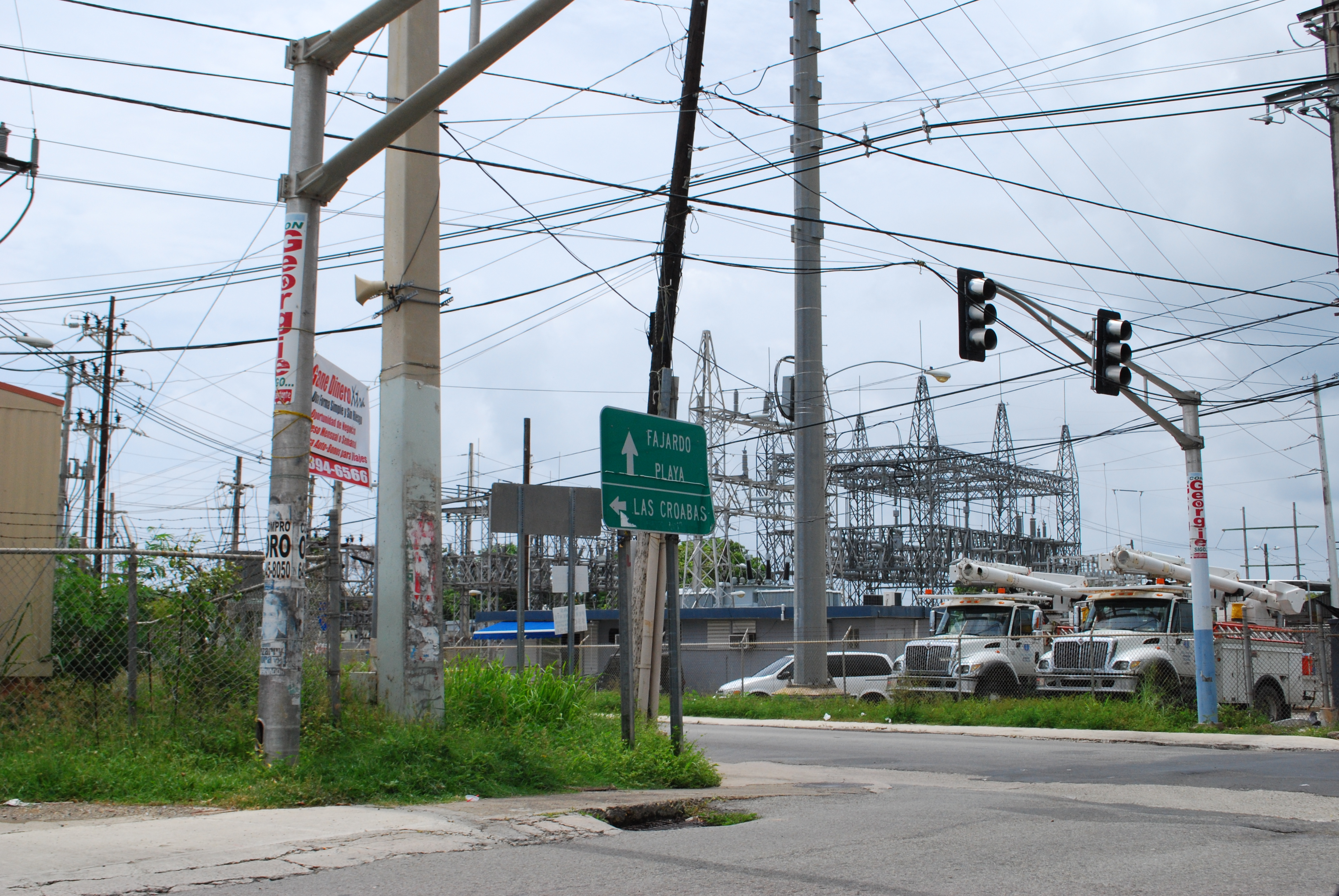
Puerto Rico Highway 195 and Puerto Rico Highway 987 intersection in Fajardo

Location	km	mi	Destinations	Notes
Fajardo barrio-pueblo	0.0	0.0	PR-3 – San Juan, Humacao	Western terminus of PR-195; diamond interchange
Fajardo barrio-pueblo	0.3	0.19	PR-976 (Calle San Rafael) – Florencio	One-way street; southbound access via Calle Victoria
Fajardo barrio-pueblo	0.4	0.25	PR-986 (Calle Diego Zalduondo Veve) – Fajardo	One-way street
Fajardo barrio-pueblo	0.5	0.31	To PR-194 / PR-Calle Luis Muñoz Rivera – Luquillo, Ceiba	One-way street; PR-195 eastbound access via Calle Celis Aguilera (PR-194 north)
Fajardo barrio-pueblo	1.0	0.62	PR-194 north (Avenida General Valero) – Luquillo	Southbound access via Calle Luis Muñoz Rivera (PR-195 west)
Fajardo barrio-pueblo–Quebrada Vueltas line	1.5	0.93	PR-987 – Las Croabas; PR-Avenida Marcelito Gotay – Ceiba	
Fajardo barrio-pueblo	3.3	2.1	Port of Fajardo – Fajardo	Eastern terminus of PR-195
1.000 mi = 1.609 km; 1.000 km = 0.621 mi: Incomplete access
