= Río Arriba =

Río or Rio Arriba is the name of the following places in the United States:

- Rio Arriba County, New Mexico
- Río Arriba, Añasco, Puerto Rico, a barrio
- Río Arriba, Arecibo, Puerto Rico, a barrio
- Río Arriba, Fajardo, Puerto Rico, a barrio
- Río Arriba, Vega Baja, Puerto Rico, a barrio

== See also ==
- Río Arriba Rebellion, an 1837 revolt in New Mexico
