= Quebrada Vueltas =

Barrio of Fajardo, Puerto Rico

- Barrio
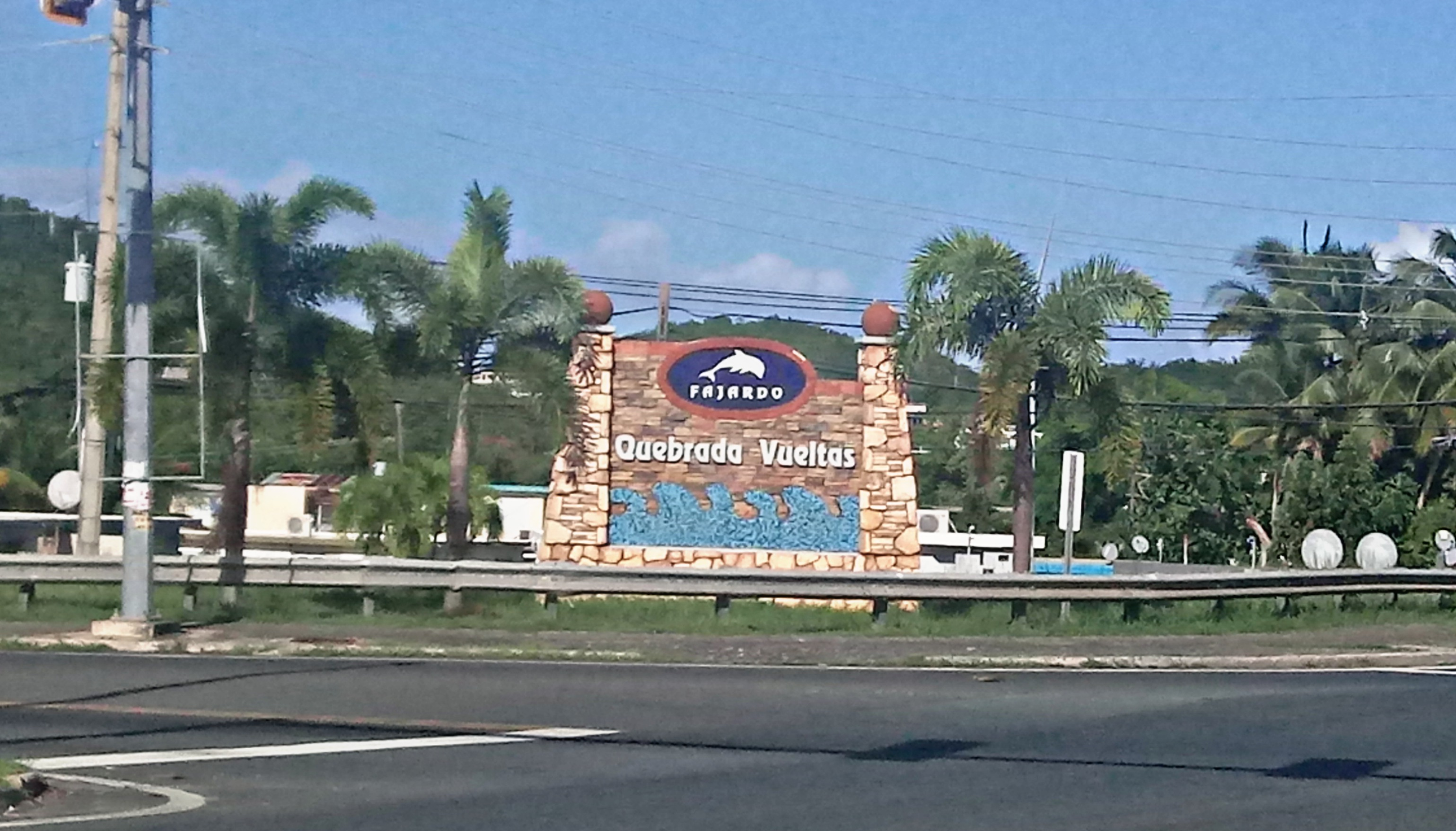
- Entrance to Quebrada Vueltas

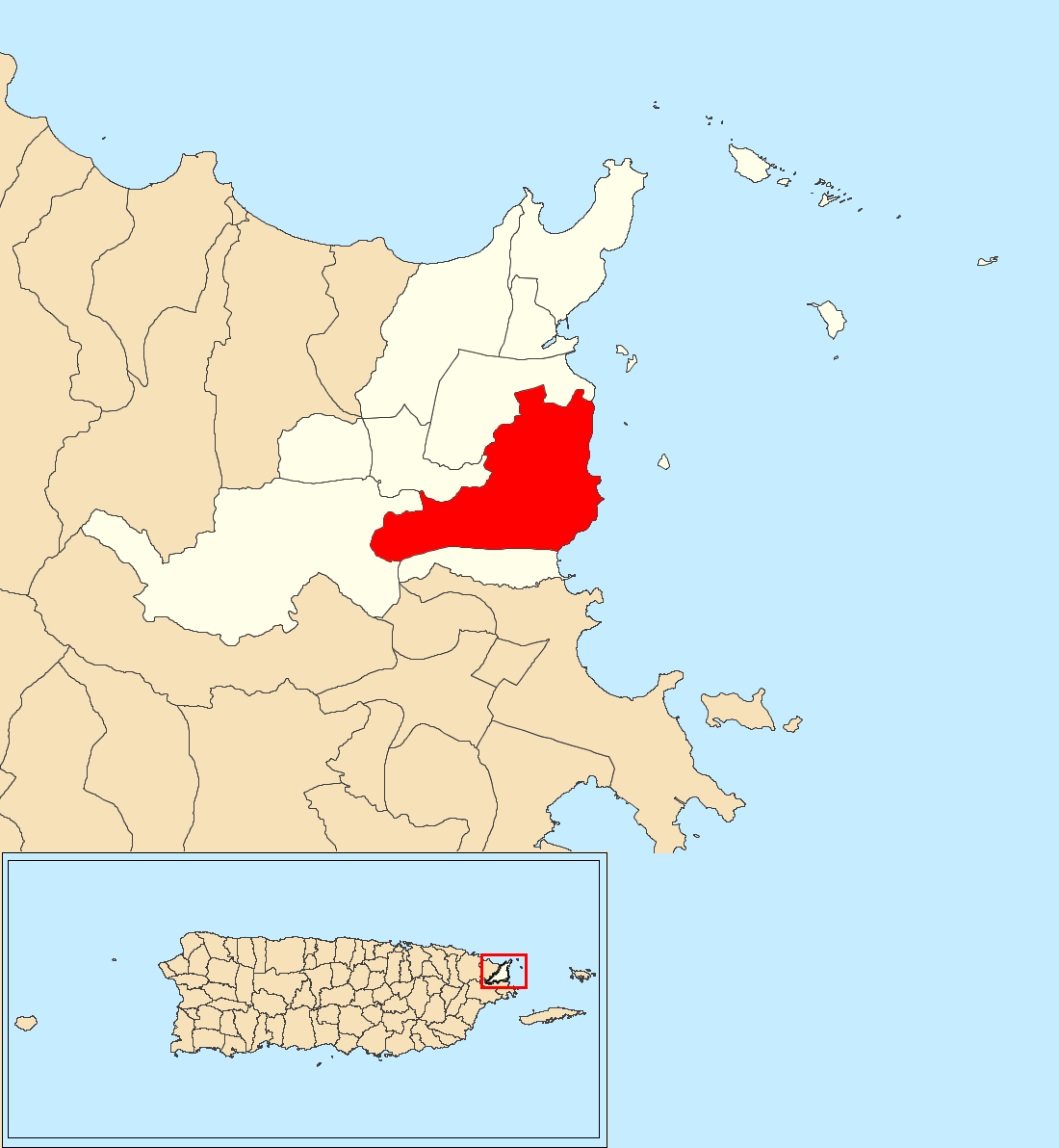
- Location of Quebrada Vueltas within the municipality of Fajardo shown in red

- Location of Puerto Rico
- Coordinates: 18°18′09″N 65°38′12″W
- Commonwealth: Puerto Rico
- Municipality: Fajardo

Area
  - Total: 6.23 sq mi (16.1 km^{2})
  - Land: 5.56 sq mi (14.4 km^{2})
  - Water: 0.67 sq mi (1.7 km^{2})
- Elevation: 33 ft (10 m)

Population (2010)
  - Total: 3,665
  - Density: 661.6/sq mi (255.4/km^{2})
- Source: 2010 Census
- Time zone: UTC−4 (AST)
- ZIP Code: 00738

Quebrada Vueltas is a barrio in the municipality of Fajardo, Puerto Rico. Its population in 2010 was 3,665.

== History ==
Quebrada Vueltas was in Spain's gazetteers until Puerto Rico was ceded by Spain in the aftermath of the Spanish–American War under the terms of the Treaty of Paris of 1898 and became an unincorporated territory of the United States. In 1899, the United States Department of War conducted a census of Puerto Rico finding that the population of Quebrada Vueltas and Florencio barrios was 1,289.

Historical population
Census	Pop.	Note	%±
1910	591		—
1920	1,133		91.7%
1930	1,865		64.6%
1940	2,124		13.9%
1950	1,740		−18.1%
1960	1,558		−10.5%
1970	1,727		10.8%
1980	2,427		40.5%
1990	2,483		2.3%
2000	3,239		30.4%
2010	3,665		13.2%
U.S. Decennial Census; 1899 (shown as 1900) 1910-1930; 1930-1950 1980-2000 2010

== Sites ==
Montesol Shopping Center is in Quebrada Vueltas.

== Gallery ==
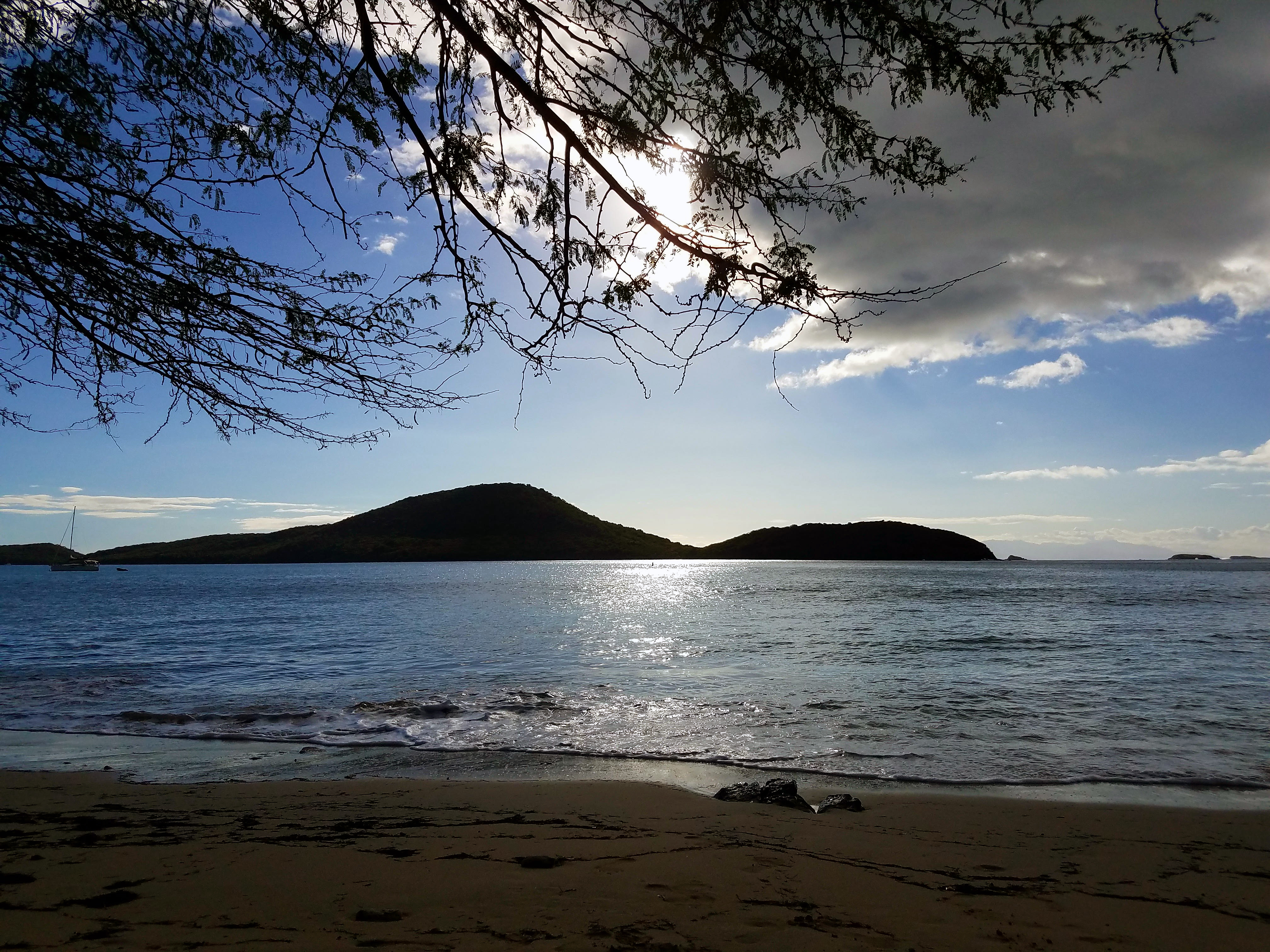
View of Melones Beach in Culebra from Quebrada Vueltas

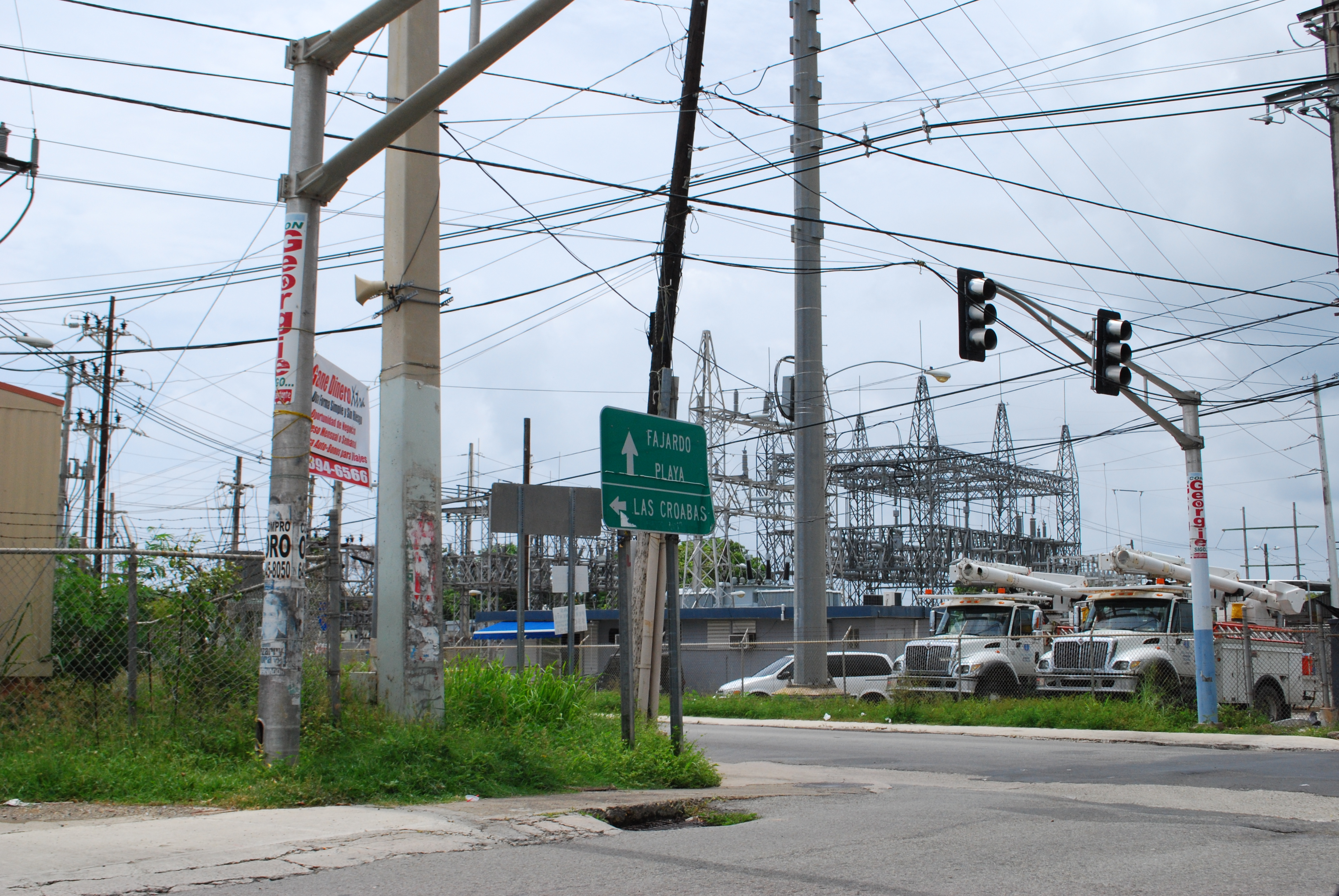
PR-195 and PR-987 intersection in Fajardo barrio-pueblo and electric substation in Quebrada Vueltas

== See also ==
- List of communities in Puerto Rico
