= Air St. Thomas =

Airline operating from the U.S. Virgin Islands

IATA	ICAO	Call sign
ZP	STT	—
- Founded: 1975; 51 years ago
- Ceased operations: December 2005; 20 years ago
- Operating bases: Cyril E. King Airport, St Thoma
- Destinations: Culebra, Fajardo, San Juan; Virgin Gorda
- Headquarters: Columbia, South Carolina

Air St. Thomas was an airline based on the island of St. Thomas, in the United States Virgin Islands. It operated regular and charter passenger services. Its main base was Cyril E. King Airport, St Thomas. The company, founded in 1975, was banned in March 2004 on the French airports and is since then blacklisted. This commuter air carrier had a very small fleet and did not operate long haul routes. It ceased operations in December 2005.

== Code data ==
- IATA Code: ZP
- ICAO Code: STT

== History ==
The airline was established in 1970 and was known as Virgin Air until 1984. Through the 1970s and well into the 1990s, Air St. Thomas faced stiff competition from Puerto Rico International Airlines, Aero Virgin Islands and Vieques Air Link, among others. Because of this, the airline concentrated mainly on intra island flights.

Puerto Rico International Airlines (Prinair) flew from 1966 to 1984, and Aero Virgin Islands flew until 2000. While Vieques Air Link still operates, Air St. Thomas did not directly compete with it as Vieques Air Link did not serve St. Thomas. One of Air St. Thomas largest competitors was American Eagle. American Eagle in the Caribbean was a code sharing partner for American Airlines and its hub operations at Luis Muñoz Marín International Airport (SJU) have been since shut down and are no longer being operated on behalf of American in the region.

After Puerto Rico International Airlines and Aero Virgin Islands began to slowly pull away from the market, Air St. Thomas began to grow, adding flights, specifically to Puerto Rican airports as well as other regional destinations in the Caribbean. The airline officially became an international airline when it added flights to the British Virgin Islands. The airline was owned by Paul Wikander (51%) and M. Wikander (49%).

== Destinations ==
Air St. Thomas served the following destinations in January 2005: Culebra, Fajardo, San Juan and Virgin Gorda.

The main route was between St.Thomas and St.Barthlemey F.W.I up until 2004.

== Fleet ==
- Britten-Norman Trislander
- 2 Cessna 402
- 5 Piper Aztec
- 2 Piper Apache
- 4 Beech 18 ( 2 Cargo 2 Passenger )
- 2 Douglas DC-3 Cargo

== See also ==
- List of defunct airlines of the United States
