= Río Arriba, Fajardo, Puerto Rico =

Barrio of Puerto Rico

Río Arriba
- Barrio
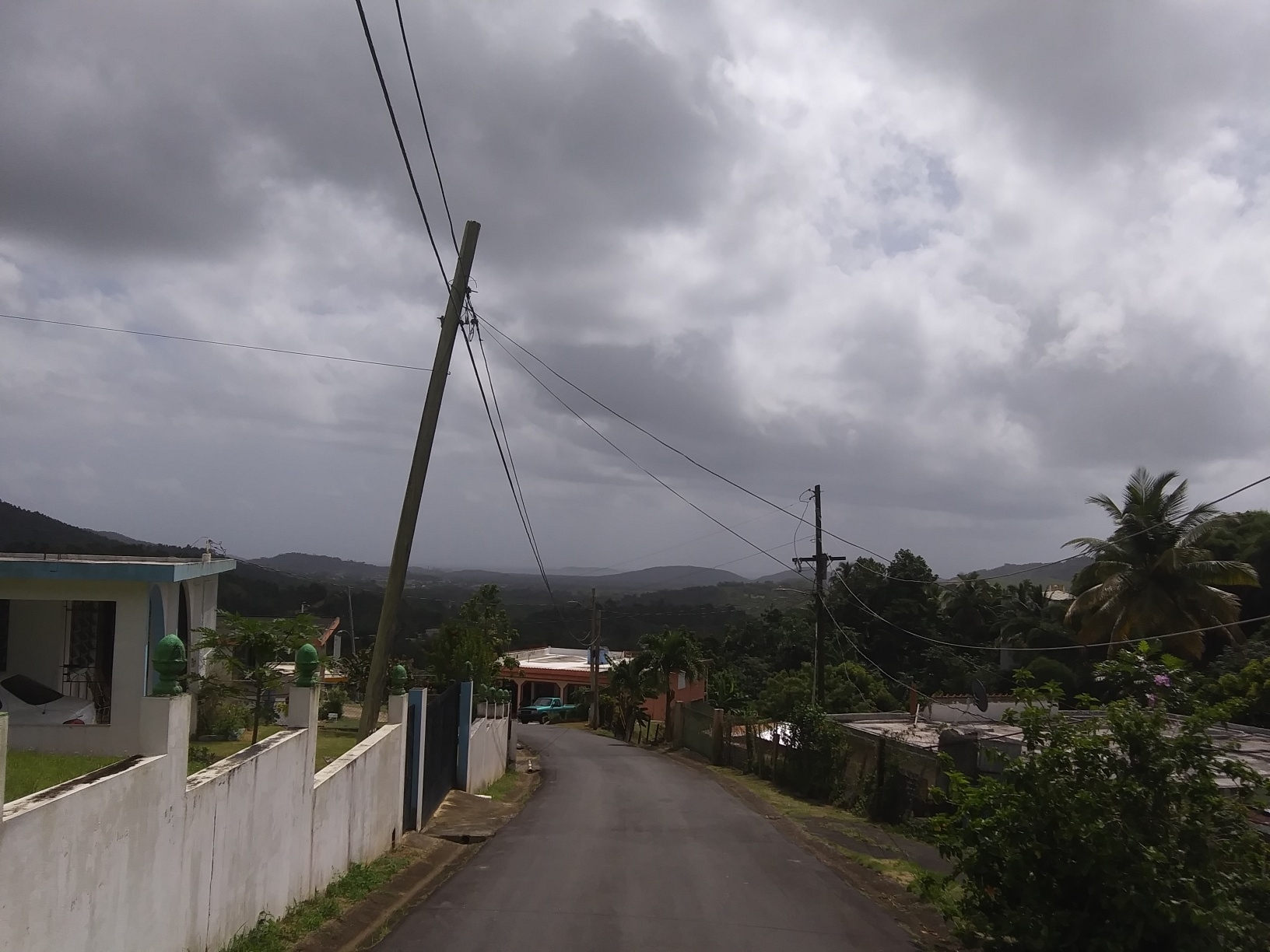
- Road in Río Arriba

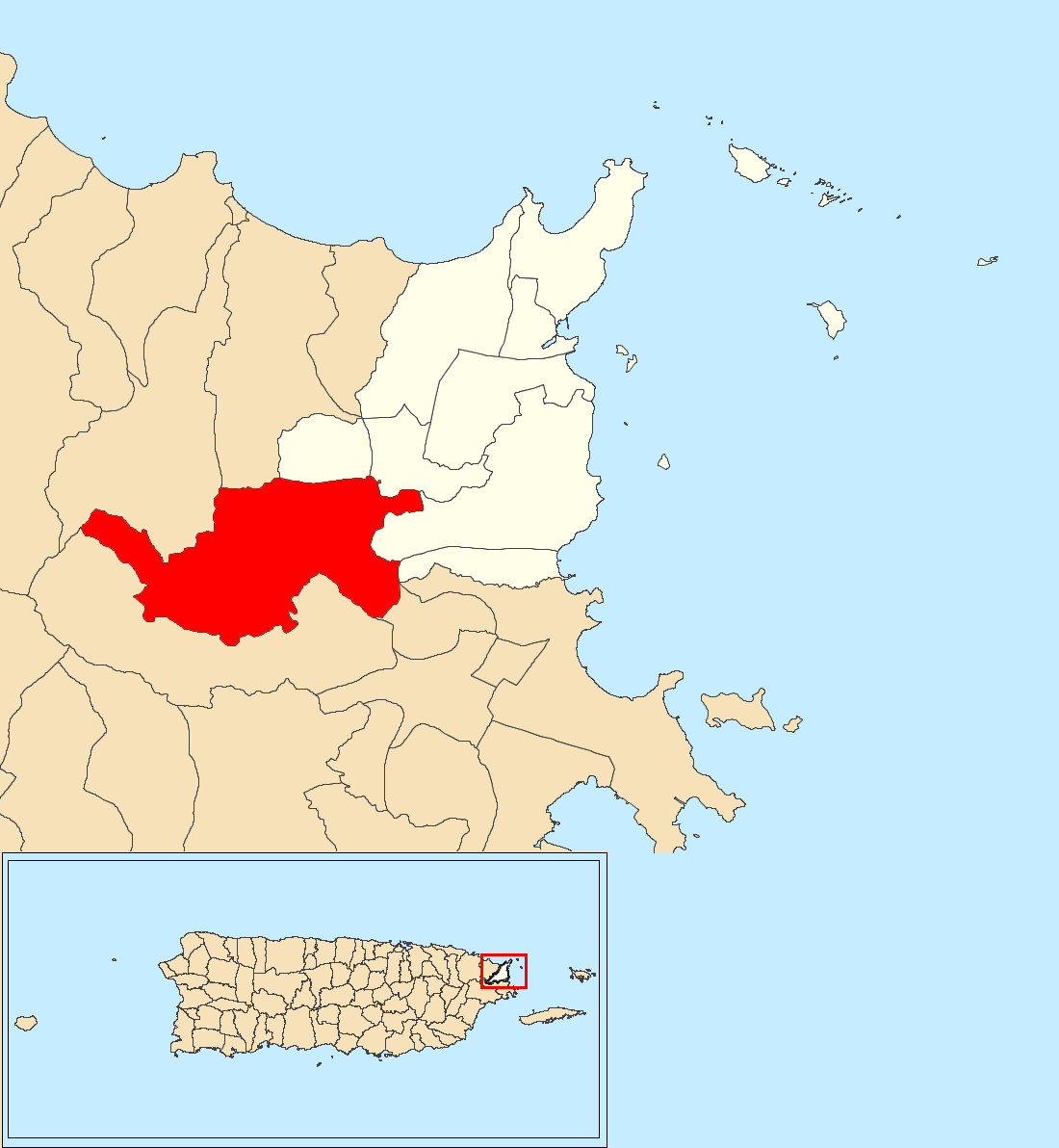
- Location of Río Arriba within the municipality of Fajardo shown in red

- Location of Puerto Rico
- Coordinates: 18°17′26″N 65°43′35″W
- Commonwealth: Puerto Rico
- Municipality: Fajardo

Area
  - Total: 8.56 sq mi (22.2 km^{2})
  - Land: 8.56 sq mi (22.2 km^{2})
  - Water: 0 sq mi (0 km^{2})
- Elevation: 430 ft (130 m)

Population (2010)
  - Total: 1,377
  - Density: 160.9/sq mi (62.1/km^{2})
- Source: 2010 Census
- Time zone: UTC−4 (AST)
- ZIP Code: 00738

Río Arriba is a barrio in the municipality of Fajardo, Puerto Rico. Its population in 2010 was 1,377.

== History ==
Río Arriba was in Spain's gazetteers until Puerto Rico was ceded by Spain in the aftermath of the Spanish–American War under the terms of the Treaty of Paris of 1898 and became an unincorporated territory of the United States. In 1899, the United States Department of War conducted a census of Puerto Rico finding that the population of Río Arriba barrio was 726.

Historical population
Census	Pop.	Note	%±
1900	726		—
1910	1,340		84.6%
1920	1,776		32.5%
1930	2,061		16.0%
1940	2,373		15.1%
1950	1,749		−26.3%
1960	1,072		−38.7%
1970	1,207		12.6%
1980	1,267		5.0%
1990	1,409		11.2%
2000	1,545		9.7%
2010	1,377		−10.9%
U.S. Decennial Census; 1899 (shown as 1900) 1910-1930; 1930-1950 1980-2000 2010

== See also ==
- List of communities in Puerto Rico
