= USS Puritan =

USS Puritan may refer to the following ships of the United States Navy:

- USS Puritan (1864) was a single-turret monitor that was never commissioned. She remained in the docks until 1874 when she was broken up and her name transferred to a new vessel.
- USS Puritan (BM-1) was a Puritan-class monitor. After a long fitting out period, she was commissioned on 10 December 1896 and served in the Spanish–American War and as a militia vessel thereafter. She was sold for scrap 26 January 1922.
- USS Puritan (ID-2222), (1918), was a transport, commissioned 20 November 1918 and used to ferry US troops home following World War I. She was decommissioned at New York 30 September 1919, and sold. In 1933, she was renamed George M. Cox. Sunk near the Rock of Ages Light off Isle Royale in 1933.
- USS Puritan (IX-69) was an auxiliary schooner, commissioned 19 May 1942 and served as a San Diego Coastal Patrol ship during World War II. She was struck from the Navy Register 28 June 1944 and transferred to the War Shipping Administration for return to her former owner 18 November 1944.
- Puritan (ACM-16) was the Army mine planter USAMP Col. Alfred A. Maybach transferred to the Navy, 7 March 1951 and placed directly in reserve. She was later reclassified as MMA–16 and renamed Puritan effective 1 May 1955. She was struck from the Navy List in 1959.
