= Quebrada Fajardo =

Barrio of Fajardo, Puerto Rico

- Barrio
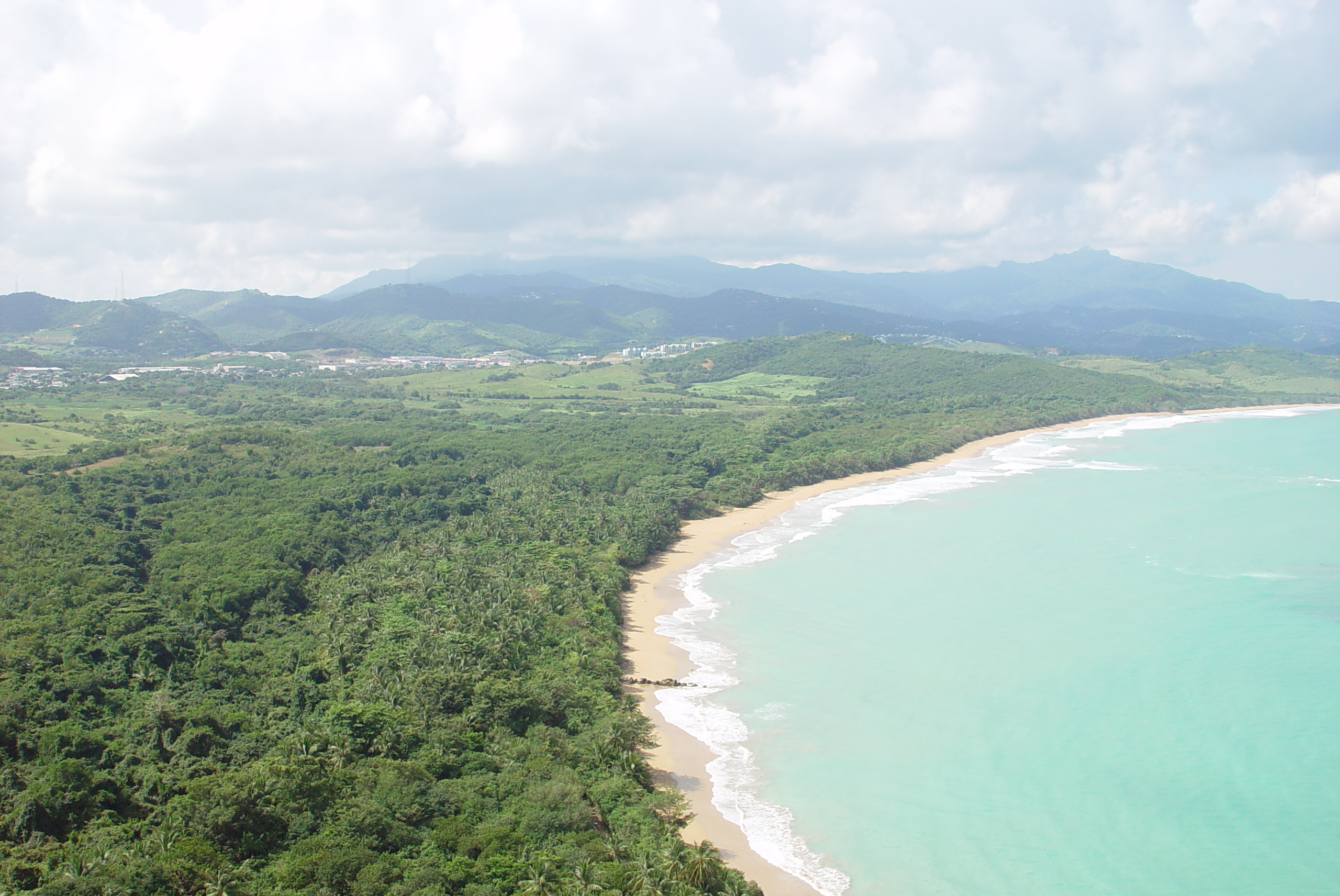
- Coast of Quebrada Fajardo

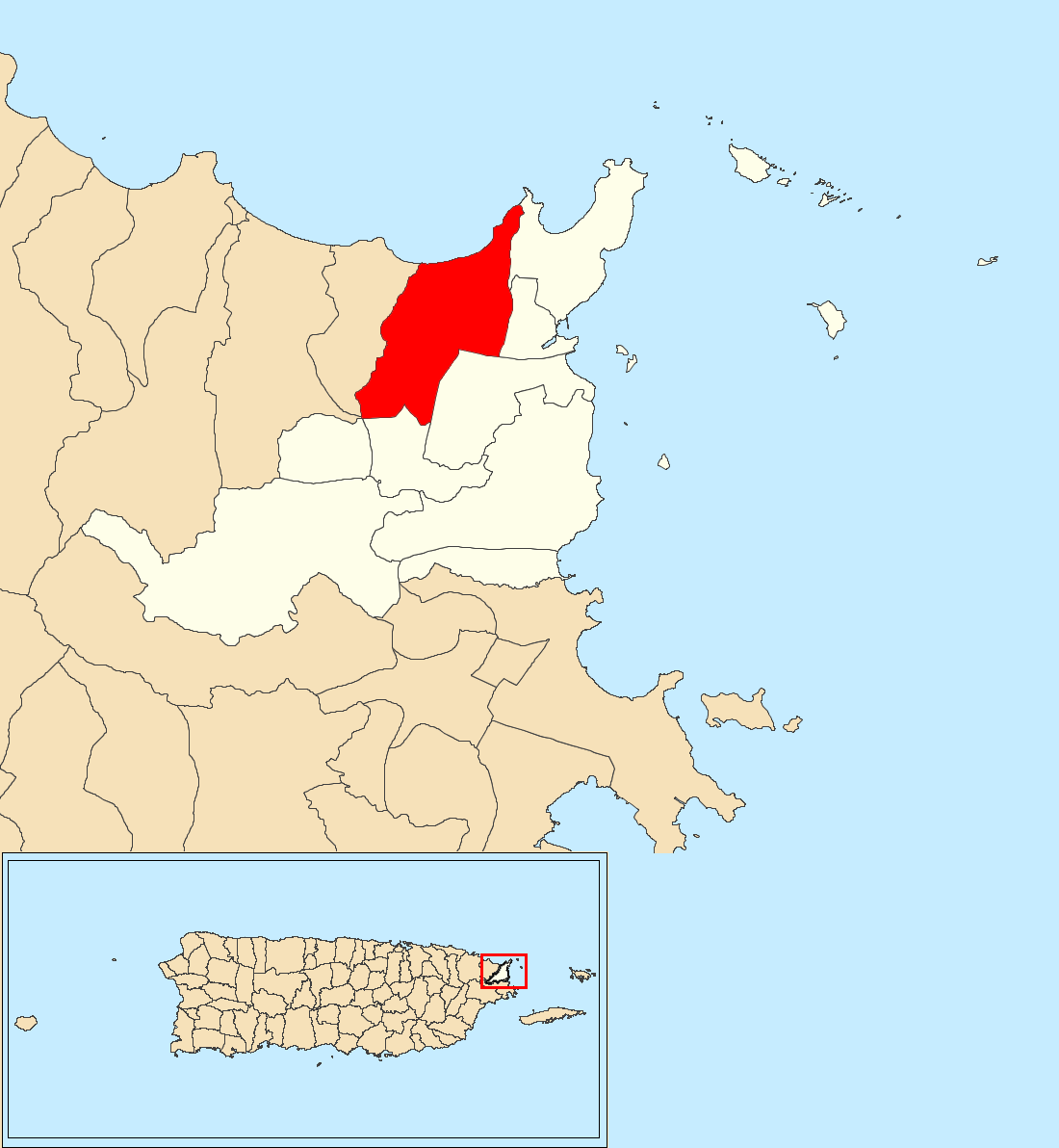
- Location of Quebrada Fajardo within the municipality of Fajardo shown in red

- Location of Puerto Rico
- Coordinates: 18°21′41″N 65°39′47″W
- Commonwealth: Puerto Rico
- Municipality: Fajardo

Area
  - Total: 7.97 sq mi (20.6 km^{2})
  - Land: 4.51 sq mi (11.7 km^{2})
  - Water: 3.46 sq mi (9.0 km^{2})
- Elevation: 0 ft (0 m)

Population (2010)
  - Total: 9,789
  - Density: 2,170.5/sq mi (838.0/km^{2})
- Source: 2010 Census
- Time zone: UTC−4 (AST)
- ZIP Code: 00738

Quebrada Fajardo is a barrio in the municipality of Fajardo, Puerto Rico. Its population in 2010 was 9,789.

== History ==
Quebrada Fajardo was in Spain's gazetteers until Puerto Rico was ceded by Spain in the aftermath of the Spanish–American War under the terms of the Treaty of Paris of 1898 and became an unincorporated territory of the United States. In 1899, the United States Department of War conducted a census of Puerto Rico finding that the population of Quebrada Fajardo barrio was 888.

Historical population
Census	Pop.	Note	%±
1900	888		—
1910	964		8.6%
1920	821		−14.8%
1930	1,086		32.3%
1940	1,423		31.0%
1950	542		−61.9%
1960	301		−44.5%
1970	0		−100.0%
1980	8,122		—
1990	10,372		27.7%
2000	10,137		−2.3%
2010	9,789		−3.4%
U.S. Decennial Census; 1899 (shown as 1900) 1910-1930; 1930-1950 1980-2000 2010

== Sectors ==
Repairs to Igualdad Street in Quebrada Fajarda, for damage that was caused by Hurricane Maria in 2017 were approved in August 2020.

Sector Los Chicos is located in Quebrada Fajardo.

== See also ==
- List of communities in Puerto Rico
