= Florencio, Fajardo, Puerto Rico =

Barrio of Puerto Rico

Florencio
- Barrio
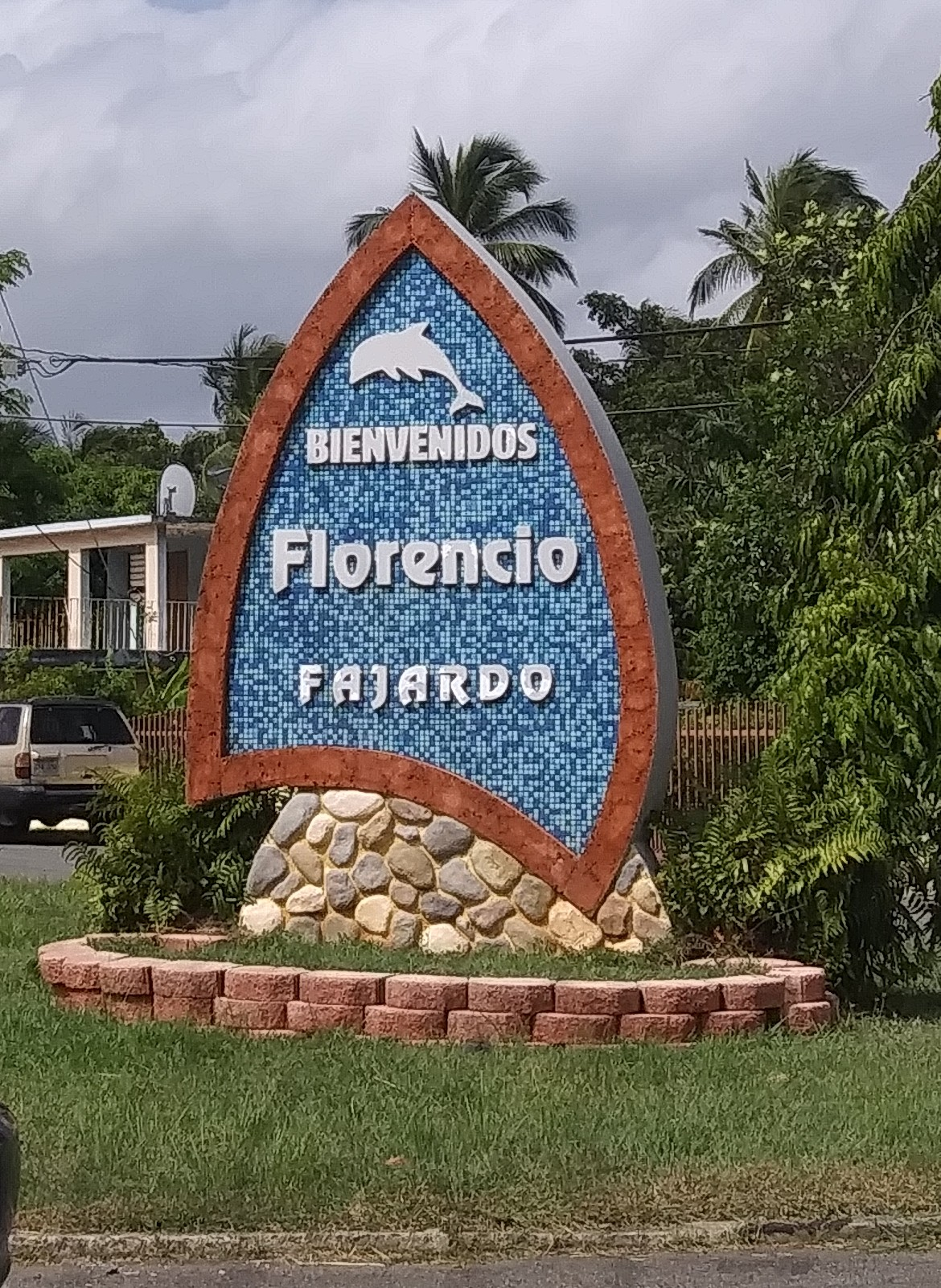
- Welcome to Florencio sign

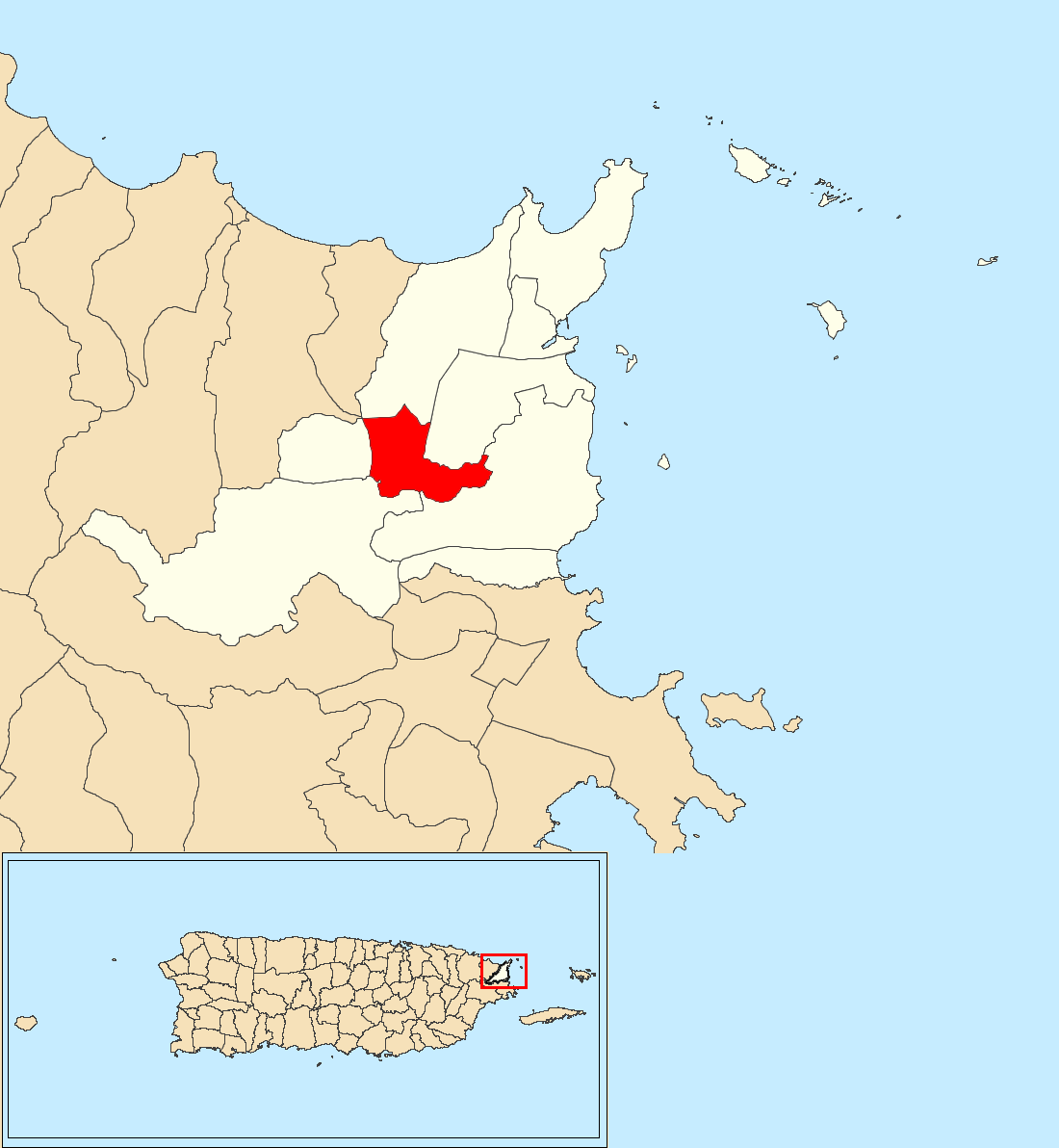
- Location of Florencio within the municipality of Fajardo shown in red

- Location of Puerto Rico
- Coordinates: 18°18′49″N 65°40′14″W
- Commonwealth: Puerto Rico
- Municipality: Fajardo

Area
  - Total: 1.66 sq mi (4.3 km^{2})
  - Land: 1.66 sq mi (4.3 km^{2})
  - Water: 0 sq mi (0 km^{2})
- Elevation: 95 ft (29 m)

Population (2010)
  - Total: 4,145
  - Density: 2,497/sq mi (964/km^{2})
- Source: 2010 Census
- Time zone: UTC−4 (AST)
- ZIP Code: 00738

Florencio is a barrio in the municipality of Fajardo, Puerto Rico. Its population in 2010 was 4,145.

== History ==
Florencio was in Spain's gazetteers until Puerto Rico was ceded by Spain in the aftermath of the Spanish–American War under the terms of the Treaty of Paris of 1898 and became an unincorporated territory of the United States. In 1899, the United States Department of War conducted a census of Puerto Rico finding that the population of Florencio and Quebrada Vueltas barrios was 1,289.

Historical population
| Census | Pop. | Note | %± |
|---|---|---|---|
| 1910 | 408 | | — |
| 1920 | 624 | | 52.9% |
| 1930 | 702 | | 12.5% |
| 1940 | 3,233 | | 360.5% |
| 1950 | 1,107 | | −65.8% |
| 1960 | 1,253 | | 13.2% |
| 1970 | 0 | | −100.0% |
| 1980 | 1,662 | | — |
| 1990 | 1,909 | | 14.9% |
| 2000 | 4,225 | | 121.3% |
| 2010 | 4,145 | | −1.9% |
U.S. Decennial Census; 1899 (shown as 1900) 1910-1930; 1930-1950 1980-2000 2010

== Features ==
PR-976 is the main east–west road through Florencio.

== See also ==
- List of communities in Puerto Rico
