= Fajardo, Puerto Rico =

Town and municipality in Puerto Rico

Fajardo Municipio Autónomo de Fajardo
- Town and Municipality
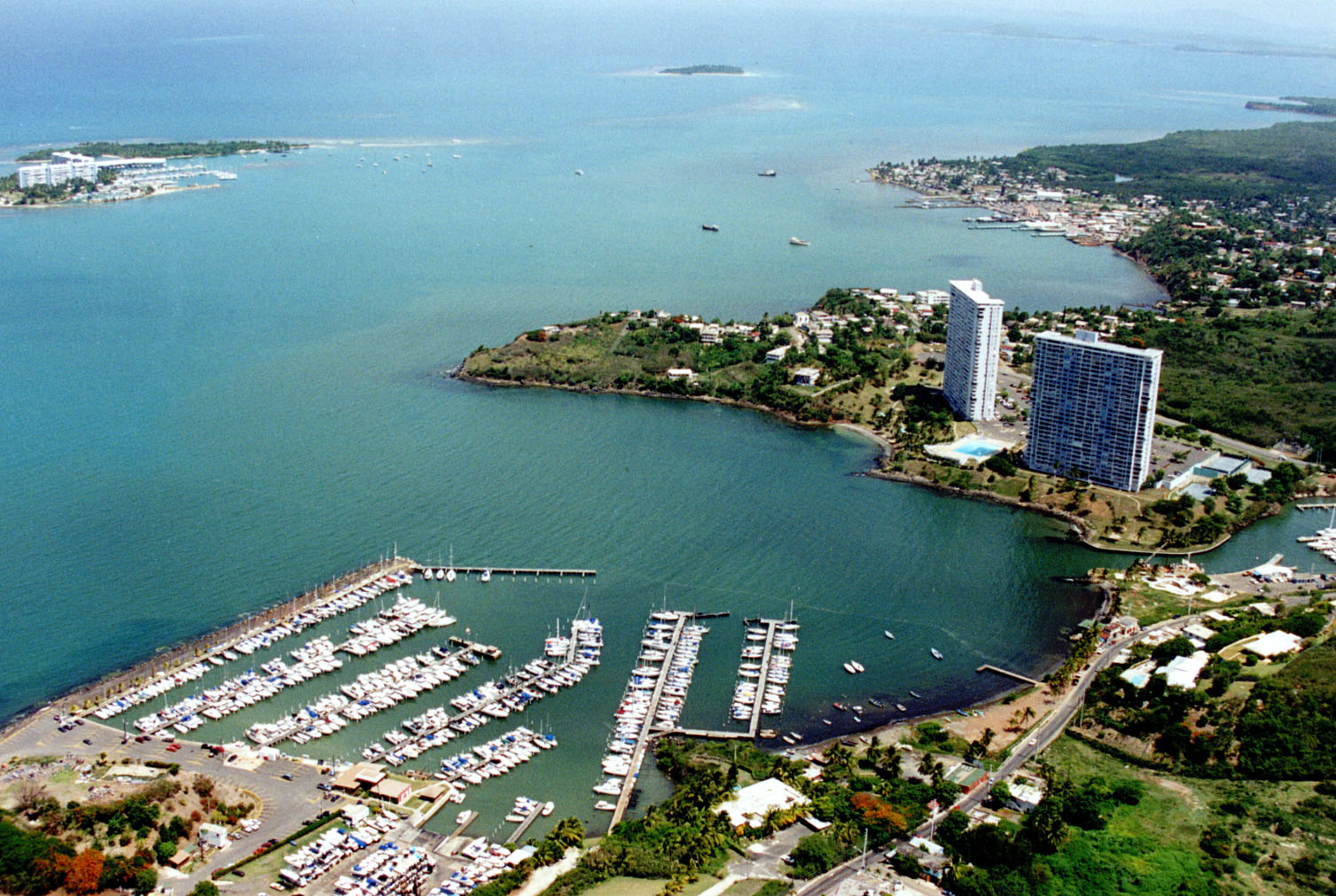
- Aerial view of Fajardo's basin

- Flag Coat of arms
- Nicknames: "Los Cariduros", "La Metrópolis del Sol Naciente"
- Anthem: "Fajardo que aquí en el oriente"
- Map of Puerto Rico highlighting Fajardo Municipality
- Coordinates: 18°19′33″N 65°39′09″W
- Sovereign state: United States
- Commonwealth: Puerto Rico
- Settled: early 16th century
- Founded: October 26, 1772
- Founder: Santiago de Mexía
- Barrios: 9 barrios: Cabezas; Demajagua; Fajardo barrio-pueblo; Florencio; Naranjo; Quebrada Fajardo; Quebrada Vueltas; Río Arriba; Sardinera

Government
  - Mayor: José Aníbal “Joey” Meléndez Méndez (PNP)
  - Senatorial dist.: 8 - Carolina
  - Representative dist.: 36

Area
  - Total: 60.41 sq mi (156.45 km^{2})
  - Land: 31 sq mi (81 km^{2})
  - Water: 29.13 sq mi (75.45 km^{2})

Population (2020)
  - Total: 32,124
  - Estimate (2025): 30,780 ▼
  - Rank: 38th in Puerto Rico
  - Density: 1,000/sq mi (400/km^{2})
- Demonym: Fajardeños
- Time zone: UTC−4 (AST)
- ZIP Codes: 00738, 00740
- Area code: 787/939
- Website: fajardopr.org

Fajardo (Spanish pronunciation: [faˈxaɾðo]) is a town and a municipality part of the San Juan-Caguas-Fajardo Combined Statistical Area in Puerto Rico.

Fajardo is the hub of much of the recreational boating in Puerto Rico and a popular launching port to Culebra, Vieques, and the U.S. and British Virgin Islands. It is also home to the largest marina in the Caribbean, called Puerto del Rey. The town contains various hotels and inns.

Offshore, near Fajardo, a few islets can be found. These are Icacos, Isla Palomino, Palominito, and Diablo, among other uninhabited coral islands and barrier reefs.

== History ==
Fajardo was founded in 1760, 1773 or 1774 (depending on the authority) as Santiago de Fajardo. It was one of the locations used by the American troops to invade Puerto Rico. On August 1, 1898 the USS Puritan under the command of Captain Frederic W. Rodgers, sailed the coastline near the city of Fajardo when he spotted the Faro de Las Cabezas de San Juan (Cape San Juan lighthouse), which was supposed to be the landing site for the US Army in Puerto Rico. Rodgers ordered some of his men ashore, including Puerto Rican volunteers, with the mission to post the American flag atop the lighthouse.

On November 14, 1824, in what was dubbed the "Foxhardo" Affair, US Naval Officer David Porter landed at Fajardo with 200 seamen and marines, threatening to destroy Fajardo because one of his men had been arrested in Puerto Rico. For taking this action without US approval, Porter was later court-martialed.

After the Spanish–American War, Puerto Rico was ceded by Spain under the terms of the Treaty of Paris of 1898 and became a territory of the United States. In 1899, the United States Department of War conducted a census of Puerto Rico and determined that the population of Fajardo was 16,782.

On September 20, 2017 Hurricane Maria struck the island of Puerto Rico. In Fajardo, the hurricane triggered numerous landslides with its strong winds and significant amount of rainfall.

== Geography ==
Fajardo is a coastal municipality with a number of islets.

- Fajardo River
- Aguas Buenas Gorge, Fajardo Gorge, Juan Diego Gorge and the Mata Redonda Gorge
- Aguas Prietas and Grande lagoons

=== Barrios ===
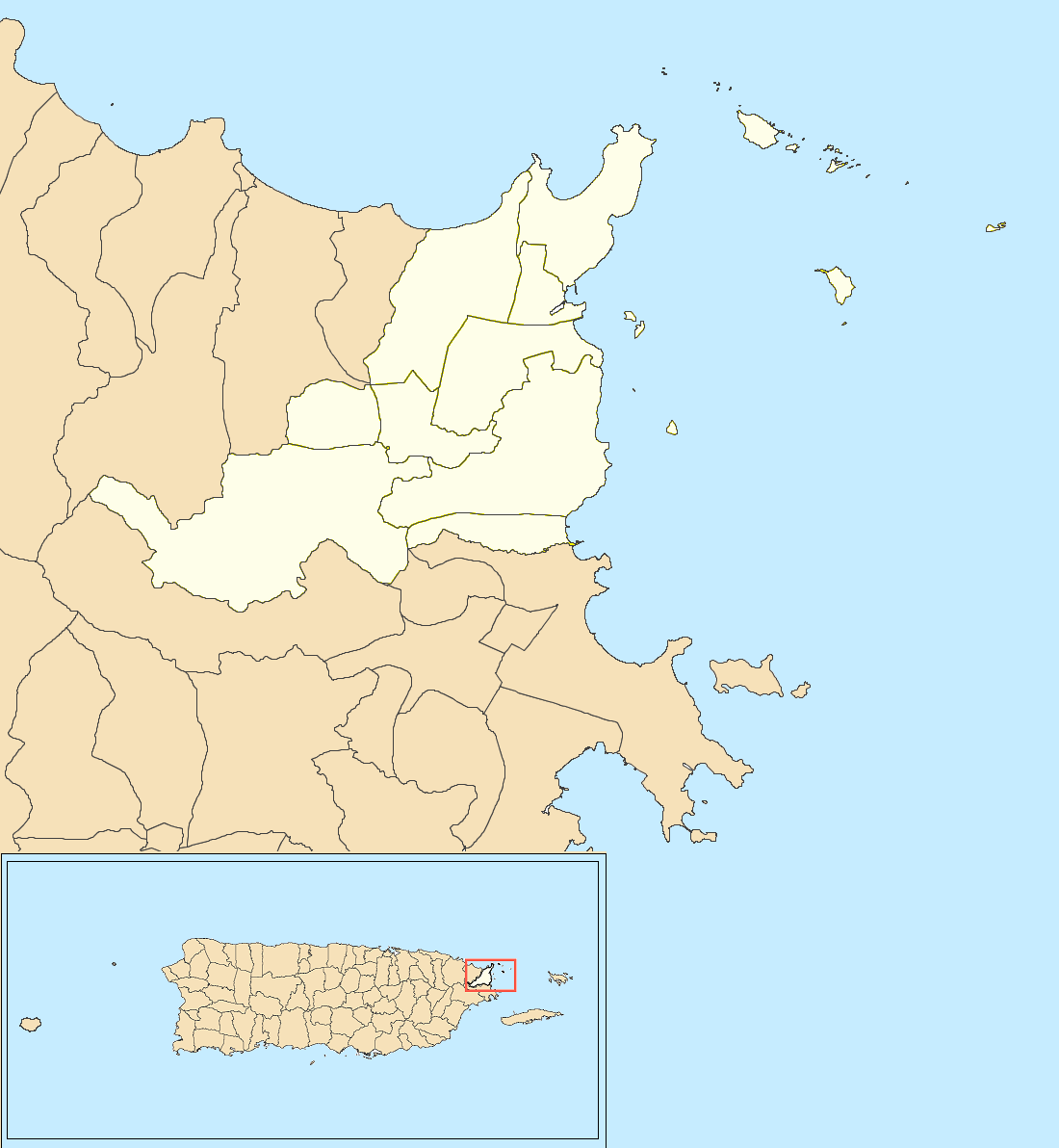
Subdivisions of Fajardo.

Like all municipalities of Puerto Rico, Fajardo is subdivided into barrios. The municipal buildings, central square and large Catholic church are located in a barrio referred to as "el pueblo".

1. Cabezas (Las Croabas)
2. Demajagua
3. Fajardo barrio-pueblo
4. Florencio
5. Naranjo
6. Quebrada Fajardo
7. Quebrada Vueltas
8. Río Arriba
9. Sardinera

=== Sectors ===
Barrios (which are, in contemporary times, roughly comparable to minor civil divisions) and subbarrios, are further subdivided into smaller areas called sectores (sectors in English). The types of sectores may vary, from normally sector to urbanización to reparto to barriada to residencial, among others.

=== Special Communities ===
Comunidades Especiales de Puerto Rico (Special Communities of Puerto Rico) are marginalized communities whose citizens are experiencing a certain amount of social exclusion. A map shows these communities occur in nearly every municipality of the commonwealth. Of the 742 places that were on the list in 2014, the following barrios, communities, sectors, or neighborhoods were in Fajardo: Obrera neighborhood, Roosevelt neighborhood, Mansión del Sapo, Maternillo, Media Luna, Sector Camacho, Vevé Calzada, and Vieques en el Aire.

== Tourism ==
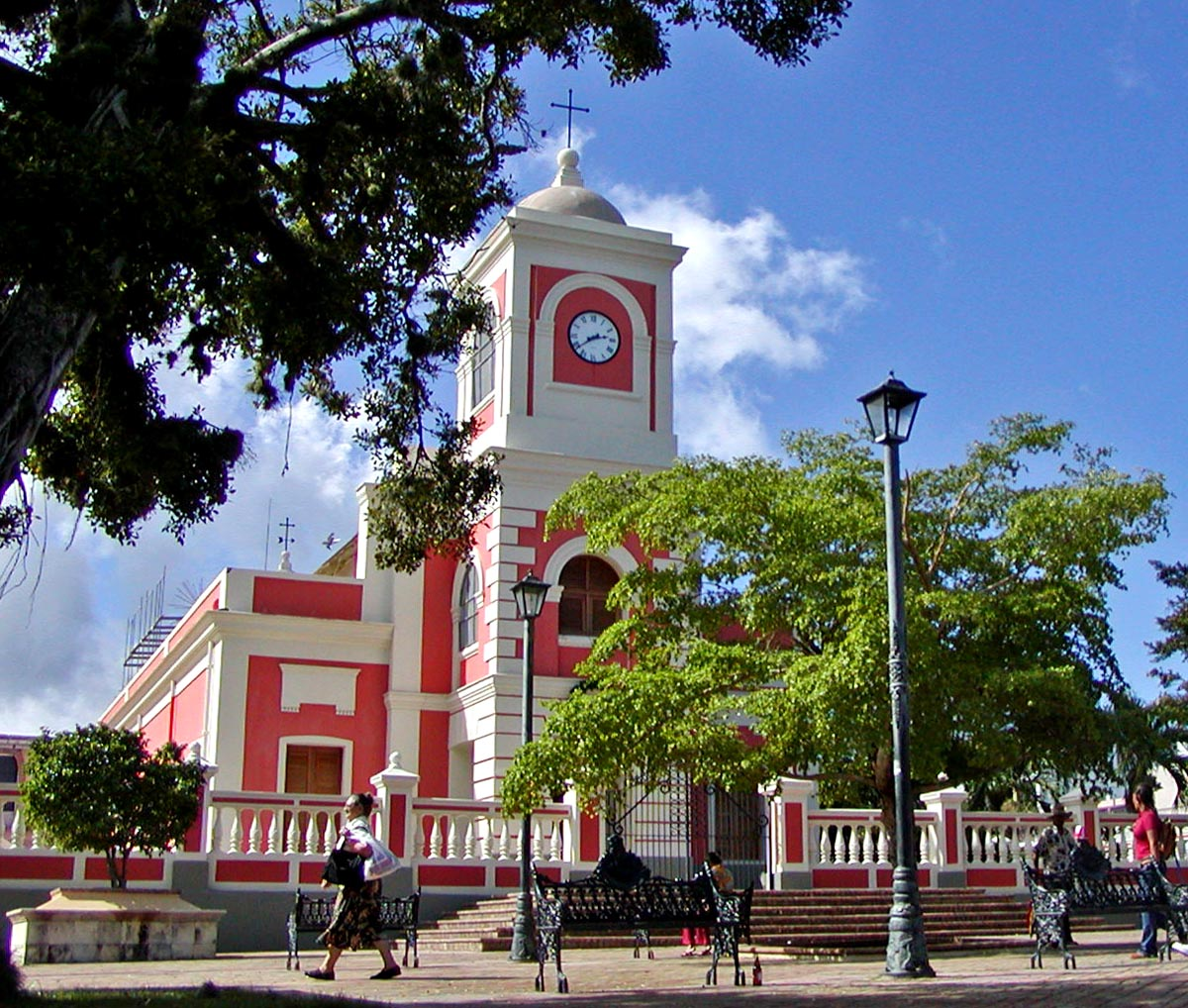
View of the church in the Fajardo town square

Fajardo is a tourist destination, especially among local tourists, because of its seafood, hotels, closeness to the small islands of Palomino, Icacos and Palominito, and the many daily trips that are available to Vieques and Culebra, both by boat and by the four airlines that served Fajardo Airport (now closed): Air Culebra, Air St. Thomas, Isla Nena Air and Vieques Air Link.

Fajardo has 46 beaches. Seven Seas Beach is one of the municipality's better-known coastal recreation areas and is used for activities including swimming, snorkeling, sailing, and scuba diving.

Fajardo is also home to one of the few Bioluminescent Lagoons in the world. Nightly trips are offered by kayak by local companies who give educational tours.

=== Landmarks and places of interest ===
To stimulate local tourism, the Puerto Rico Tourism Company launched the Voy Turistiendo ("I'm Touring") campaign, with a passport book and website. The Fajardo page lists Reserva Natural de Las Cabezas de San Juan, Cayo Icacos, and Hacienda Chocolat, as places of interest.

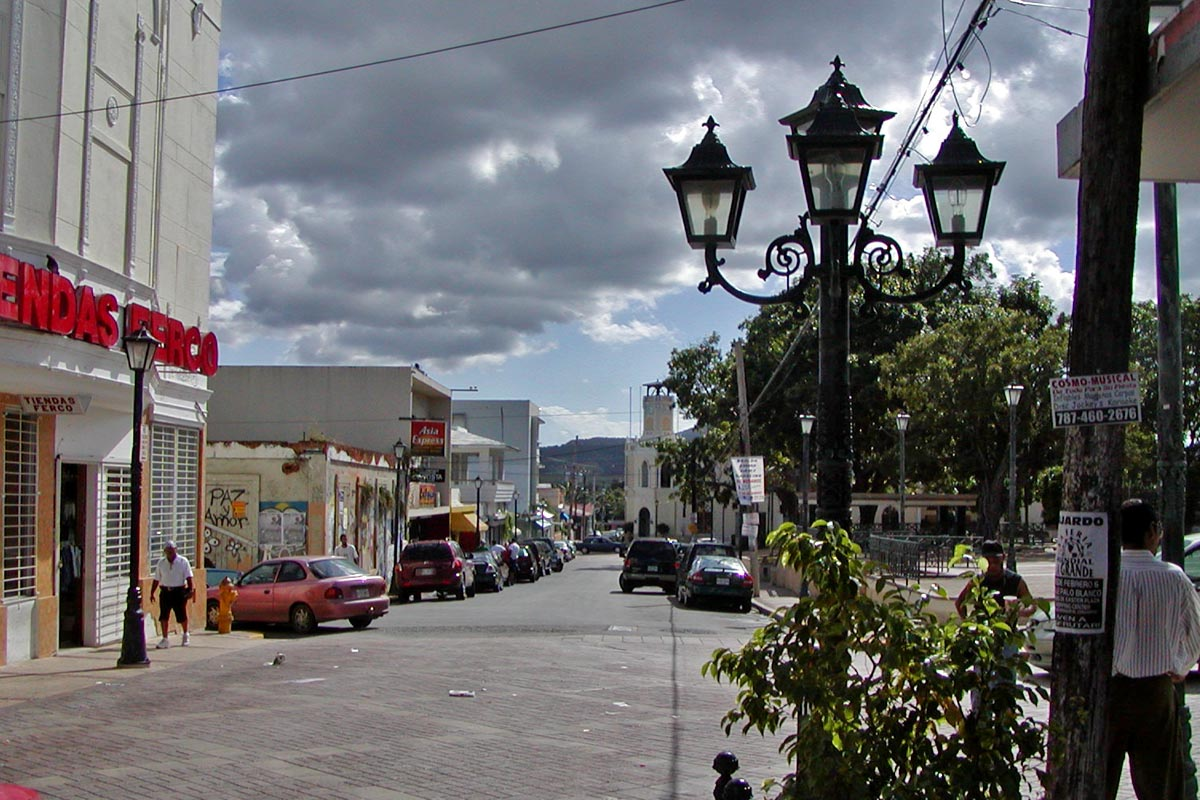
Street scene near Fajardo plaza and square

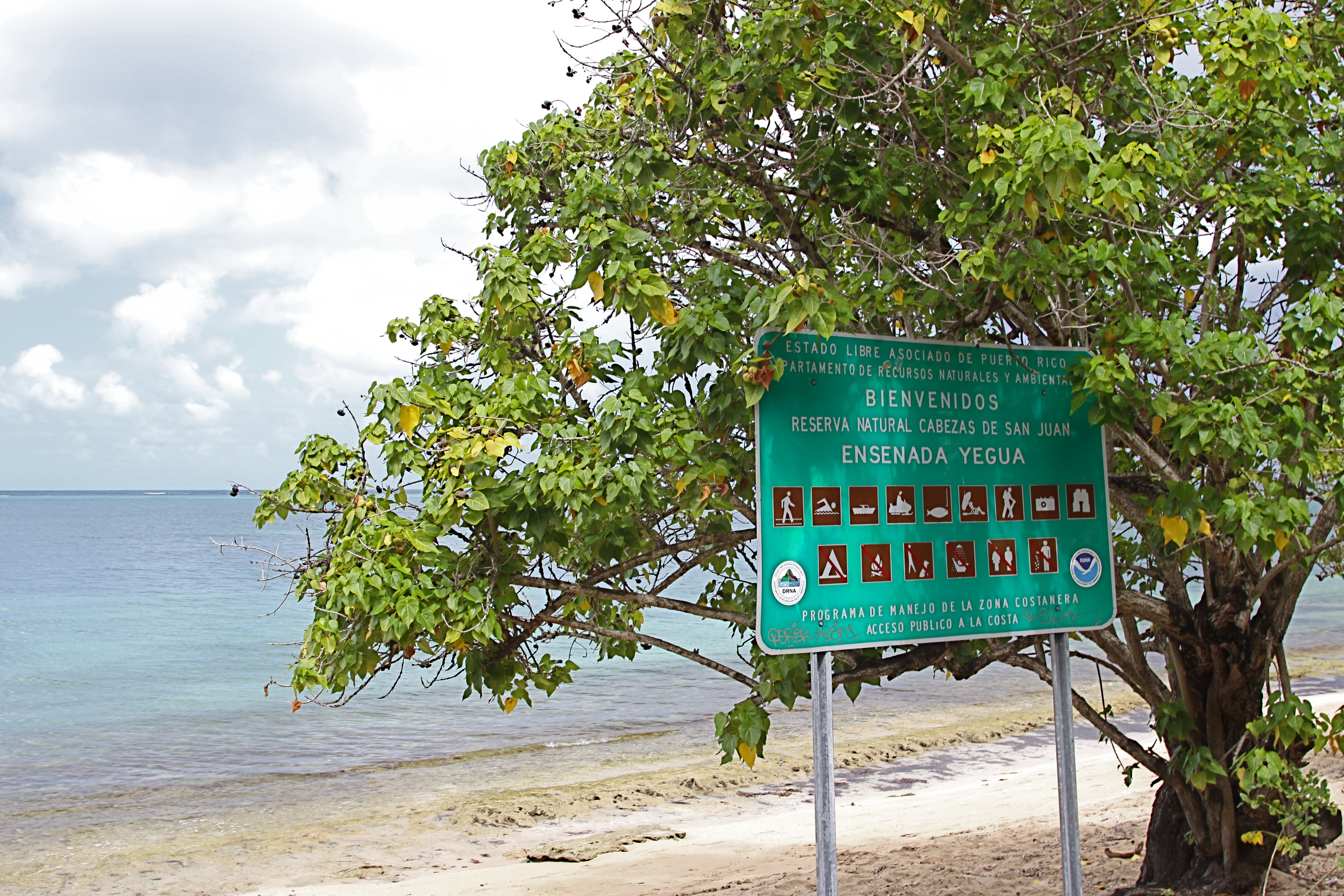
Reserva Natural Cabezas de San Juan

- Las Cabezas de San Juan Light House - One of the oldest lighthouses in Puerto Rico. Only one used for nautical reasons in the entire island.
- Laguna Grande - One of the few Bioluminescent bays in the world that glow and offers night kayaking tours all year round.
- Puerto del Rey Marina - Biggest marina in the Caribbean.
- U.S. Customs House - Constructed in 1930 still in use by the U.S. Customs & Border Protection.
- Santiago Apostol Cathedral
- El Conquistador Resort - An historic 700+ room resort and convention center with its own private island (Palomino Island), water park (El Coqui Water Park), and 3 ft 10 in (1,168 mm) narrow-gauge funicular railway connecting its main hotel building with its marina. It was closed in 2017 after Hurricane Maria, and was reopened in 2022.
- Seven Seas Beach - Classified Blue Flag for its sanitary health guarantees.
- Las Cabezas de San Juan Nature Reserve - Home to mangroves and to the lighthouse.
- Fajardo Port - Used by locals and tourists to visit the island municipalities of Vieques and Culebra.
- The main town square - A colonial-style town square in the downtown.
- Old Fajardo Sugar Cane Refinery
- Isleta Marina
- Las Croabas Nature Reserve
- Bioluminescent Bay Fajardo
- Las Croabas Recreational Park
- Hipolito Robles Sports Complex
- Icacos, Palomino and Palominito Cays (islets)

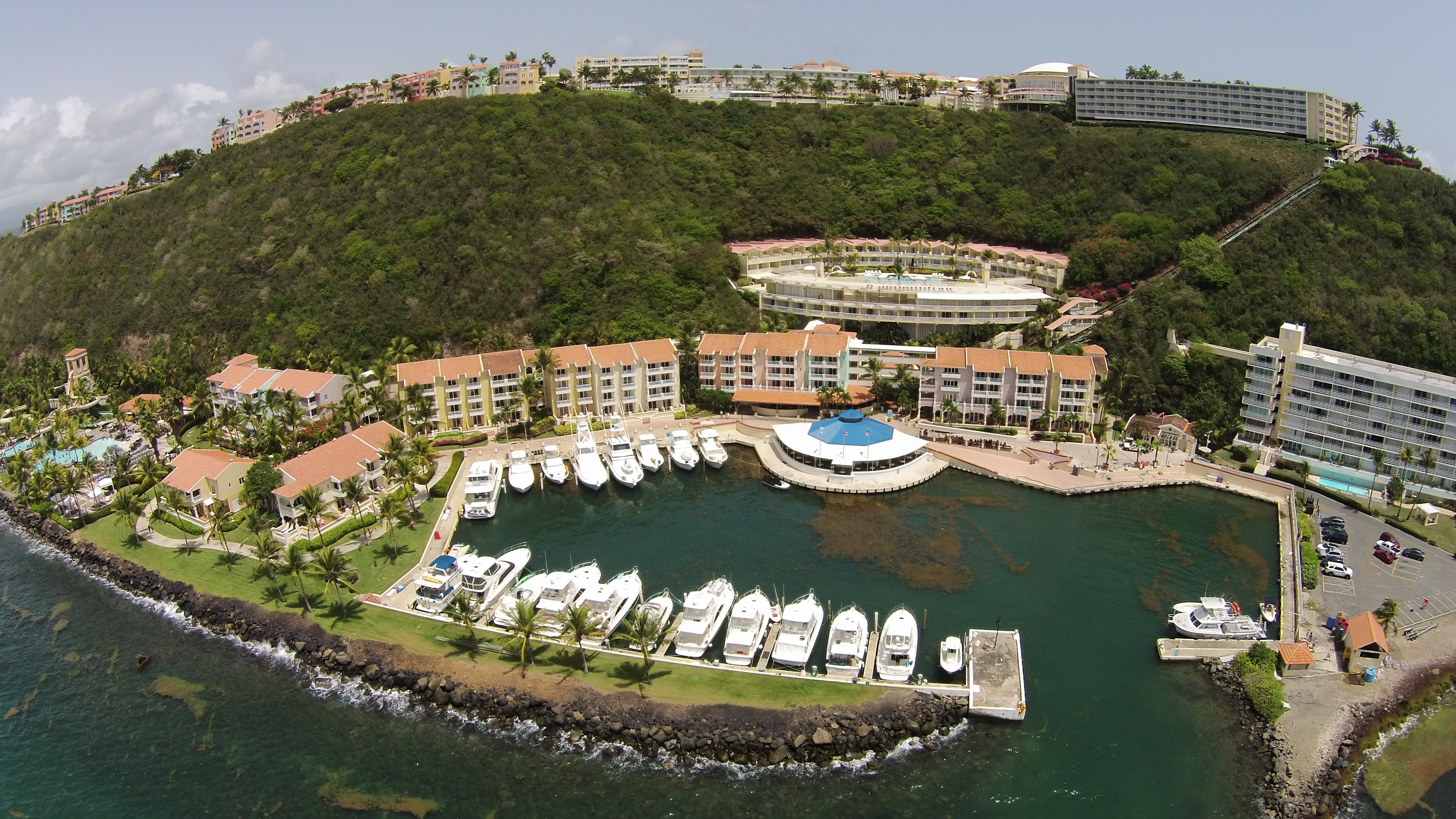
Aerial view of El Conquistador Resort and Harbor

== Economy ==
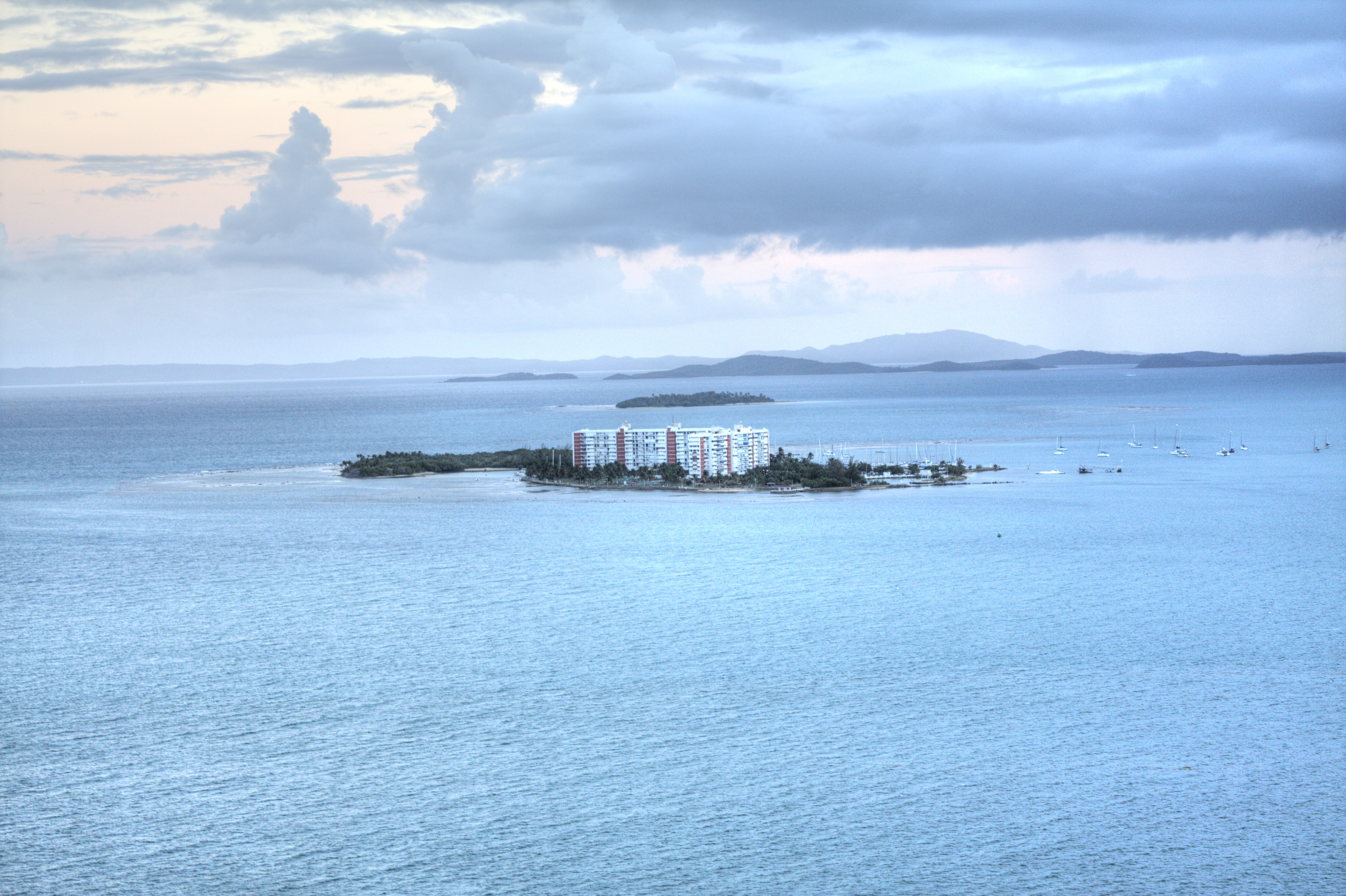
Island off the coast of Fajardo

=== Industry ===
Electrical components, metal work, furniture manufacturing. Fajardo is also home to pharmaceutical and bio-sciences companies.

Due to its rich ports and closeness to smaller islands, Fajardo is also known for its fishing industries.

== Culture ==
=== Festivals and events ===
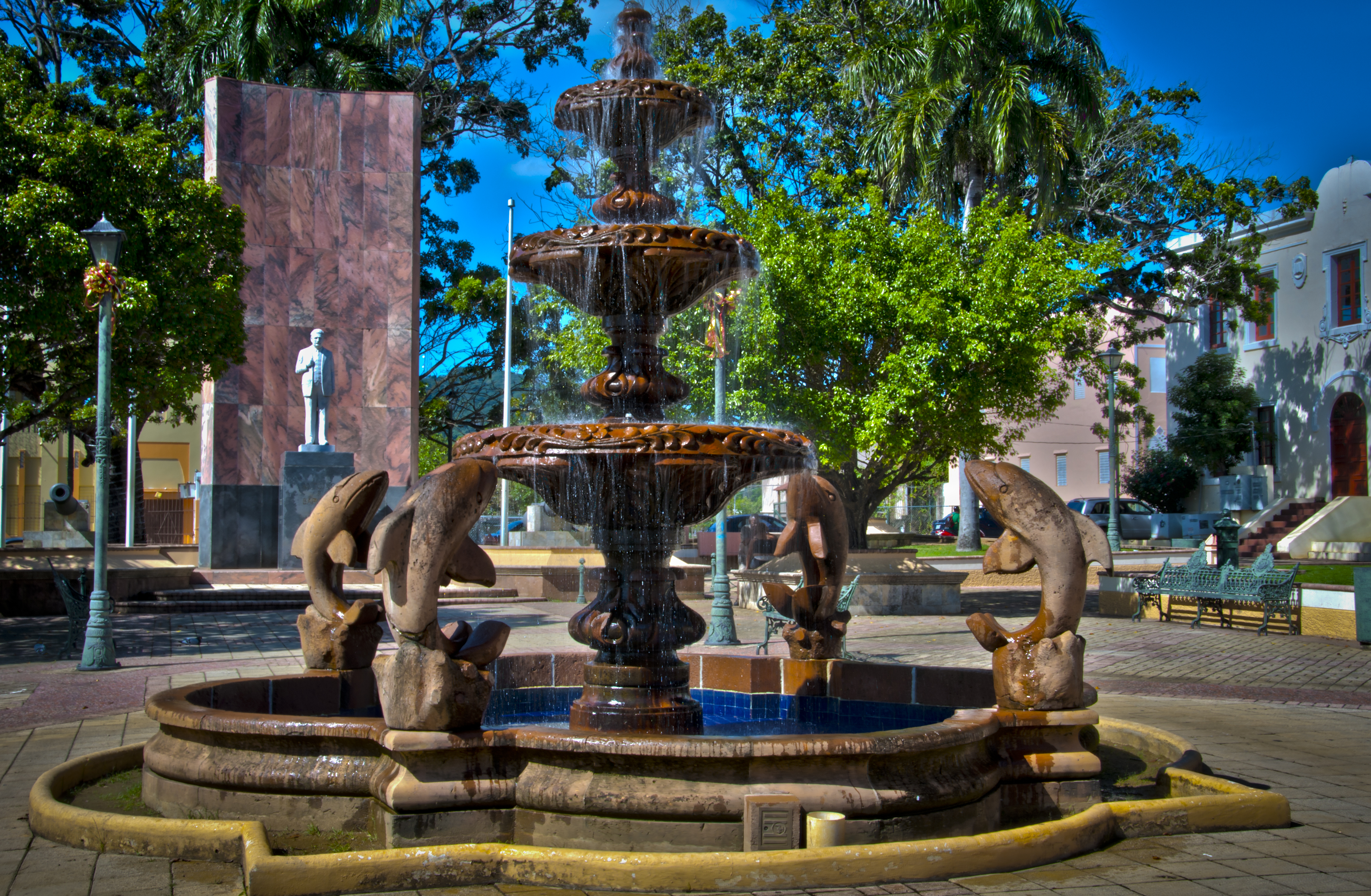
Fountain in Fajardo's plaza

Fajardo celebrates its patron saint festival in July. The Fiestas Patronales de Santiago Apostol is a religious and cultural celebration that generally features parades, games, artisans, amusement rides, regional food, and live entertainment. The festival has featured live performances by well-known artists such as Tito Nieves, Johnny Ventura and Sonora Ponceña.

Other festivals and events celebrated in Fajardo include:

- Bicycletada Fajardeña - April
- Kite Festival - April
- Kelly Cup Sailboat Regata - April
- Bomba & Plena Festival - May
- Paradise Fiesta - August
- Cocolía Festival - November

=== Sports ===
Fajardo Soccer Stadium is a soccer-specific stadium in Fajardo, Puerto Rico. The 3,800 capacity stadium was developed at a cost of $3.9M, and opened December 12, 2015 and is home venue of Puerto Rico Sol.

Fajardo in the past was home to a National Superior Basketball; Baloncesto Superior Nacional BSN basketball team, the Fajardo Cariduros or as they are known in the Island Cariduros de Fajardo. George Torres, Mario Morales and Mario Butler were three of the most famous players to play for that franchise.

In 2007, the team returned once again to the BSN. The team known as the "Titanes de Morovis" was moved to Fajardo, and was renamed "Cariduros de Fajardo". Unlike the NBA and other sports leagues in the United States, Puerto Rican franchises rarely leave the original name of the franchise when they move to a different city.

Once, there was a basketball team for the Puerto Rican Basketball League known as the "Conquistadores de Fajardo".

Fajardo also has a AA Amateur Baseball Team Los Cariduros de Fajardo and have won over 10 sectional championships, 3 time national runners-up in 1974, 2003 and 2005, and 3 times national champions in 1954, 2004 and 2010.

== Demographics ==
Historical population
Census	Pop.	Note	%±
1900	16,782		—
1910	21,135		25.9%
1920	14,302		−32.3%
1930	16,321		14.1%
1940	20,405		25.0%
1950	22,116		8.4%
1960	18,321		−17.2%
1970	23,032		25.7%
1980	32,087		39.3%
1990	36,882		14.9%
2000	40,712		10.4%
2010	36,993		−9.1%
2020	32,124		−13.2%
2025 (est.)	30,780	▼	−4.2%
U.S. Decennial Census; 1899 (shown as 1900) 1910-1930; 1930-1950 1960-2000 2010 2020

Ethnicity - Fajardo, Puerto Rico - 2010 Census
Ethnicity	Population	% of Total
European	23,964	64.8%
African	6,864	18.6%
Native American and Alaska Native	258	0.7%
Asian	73	0.3%
Native Hawaiian/Pacific Islander	4	0.0%
Some other ethnicity	3,822	10.3%
Two or more ethnicities	1,986	5.4%

As of 2000, speakers of English as a first language accounted for 13.76% of the population.

== Government ==
All municipalities in Puerto Rico are administered by a mayor, elected every four years. The current mayor of Fajardo is José Aníbal "Joey" Meléndez Méndez, of the New Progressive Party (PNP). On February 19, 2020, he took over for his father Aníbal Meléndez Rivera, who resigned after 31 years as mayor, citing health concerns. Meéndez Méndez was first elected in his own right at the 2020 general elections.

The city belongs to the Puerto Rico Senatorial district VIII, which is represented by two Senators. In 2024, Marissa Jiménez and Héctor Joaquín Sánchez Álvarez were elected as District Senators.

== Transportation ==
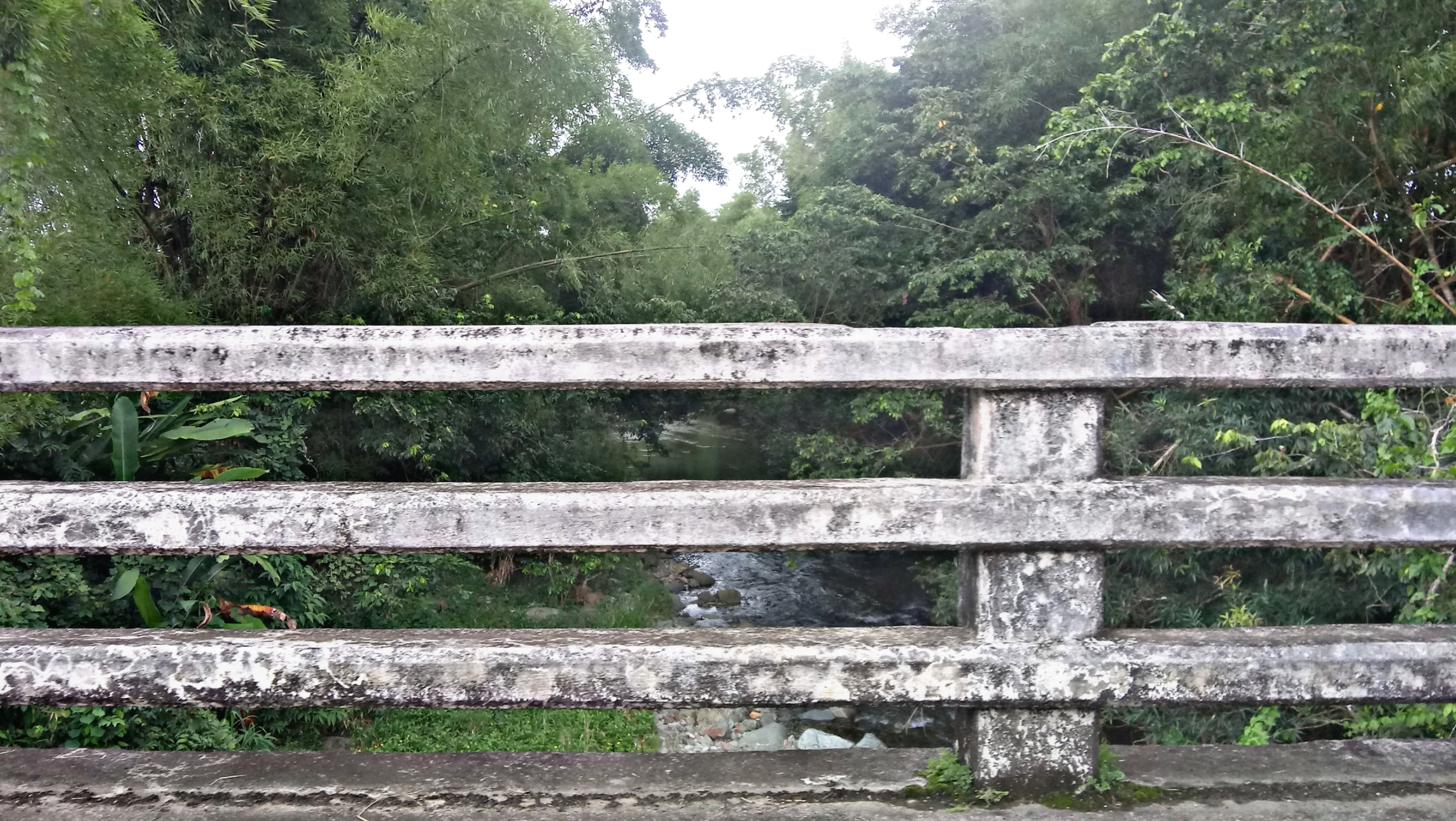
Bridge on PR-971 between Fajardo and Ceiba near Las Tinajas, Charco Frio and Hacienda Tinajas, two tourist attractions located just inside the eastern side of the El Yunque National Forest

There are 20 bridges in Fajardo.

Diego Jiménez Torres Airport was Fajardo's airport and handled commercial airline flights to the city, but it was permanently closed in 2015.

== Symbols ==
The municipio has an official flag and coat of arms.

=== Flag ===
Fajardo's flag is a tricolor triband. The upper band is gules (red), symbolizing the color of the shield's border. Silver (white), the center band, stands for the color of the main pieces that appear in the shield and the crown. Azure (blue), the lower band, represents the color of the sky and the sea of Fajardo. Centered is the coat of arms of the village (villa) in natural colors.

=== Coat of arms ===
The coat of arms is formed as a square with a rounded base and stamped at the top with a crown mural of three towers. It is supported by two dolphins, and underneath the base a banner with the inscription “Santiago de Fajardo”.

== Notable Fajardeños ==
- Félix "Tito" Trinidad - Boxer
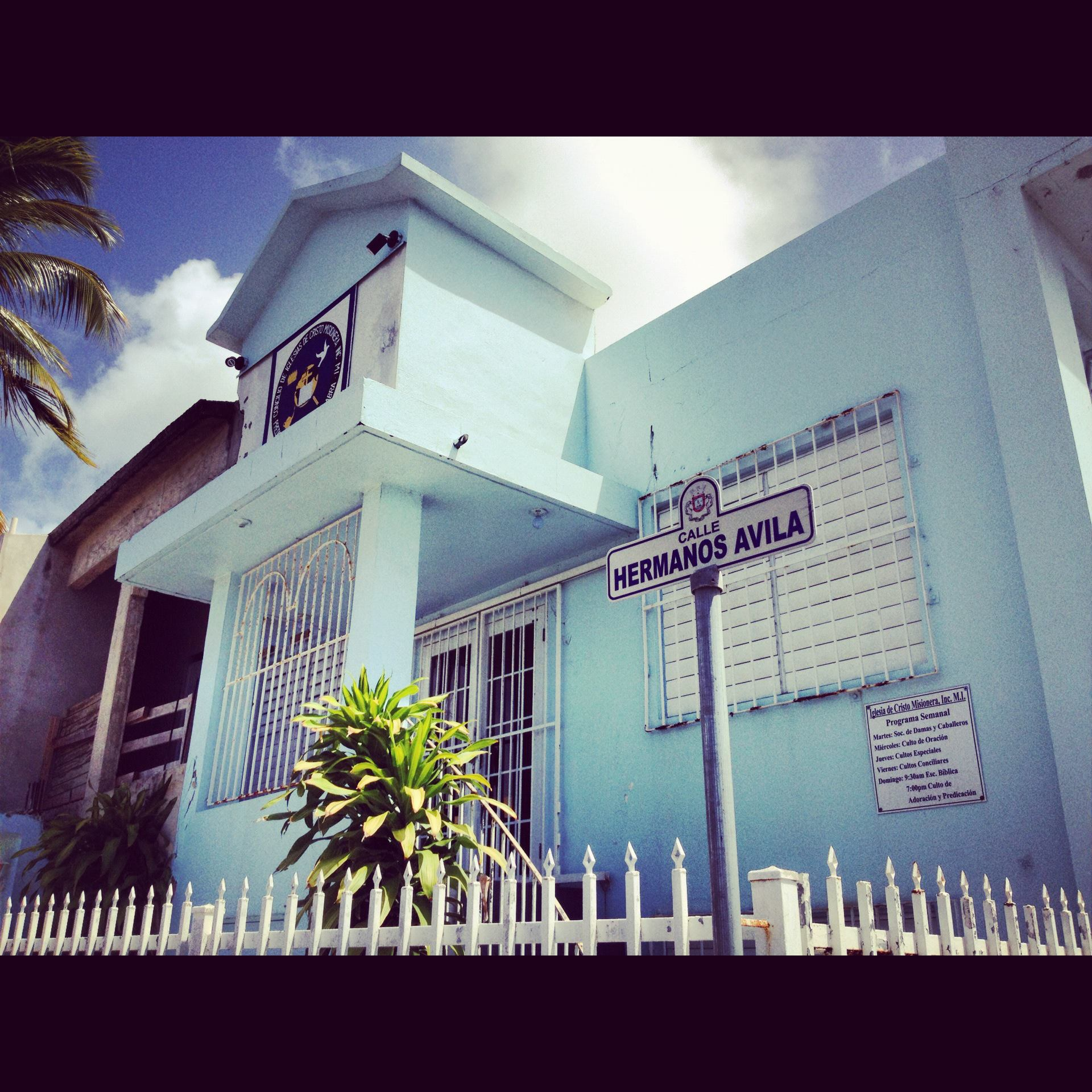
- Calle Hermanos Avila - Parcelas Beltrán
  Hermanos Ávila Esperanza - Military (Andrés; Pedro; Norberto; Justino; Guillermo y Tomás) - A street in Fajardo (Parcelas Beltrán) and Culebra (PR-251) is named after the Ávila Brothers. These six soldiers were honored for their exceptional work in the Korean and Vietnam wars and for returning home to Puerto Rico alive.
- Roberto Angleró - Music composer and singer
- Carlos Arroyo - Basketball Player
- Antonio R. Barceló - Politician & The First President of the Puerto Rico Senate.
- Eugenio S. Belaval - Legislator
- General Antonio Valero de Bernabé - Fought with Simón Bolívar.
- Norma Candal - Comedian
- Ivonne Coll - Actress
- Héctor Cotto - Athlete
- Emilio Belaval Maldonado - Served as Associate Justice for the Puerto Rico Supreme Court.
- John John Molina - Boxer
- Pedro Rosa Nales - TV reporter
- Dr. Antonia Coello de Novelo - Former Surgeon General of the United States.
- Josefina Barceló Bird de Romero - Politician
- Marquita Rivera - first actress from Puerto Rico to appear in a major Hollywood motion picture.
- Peter John Ramos - Basketball Player
- Carlos Rivera - Professional Baseball Player
- José Pérez - Actor
- Ashley Cariño - Miss Universe Puerto Rico 2022
- Subriel Matias - Boxer

== Gallery ==
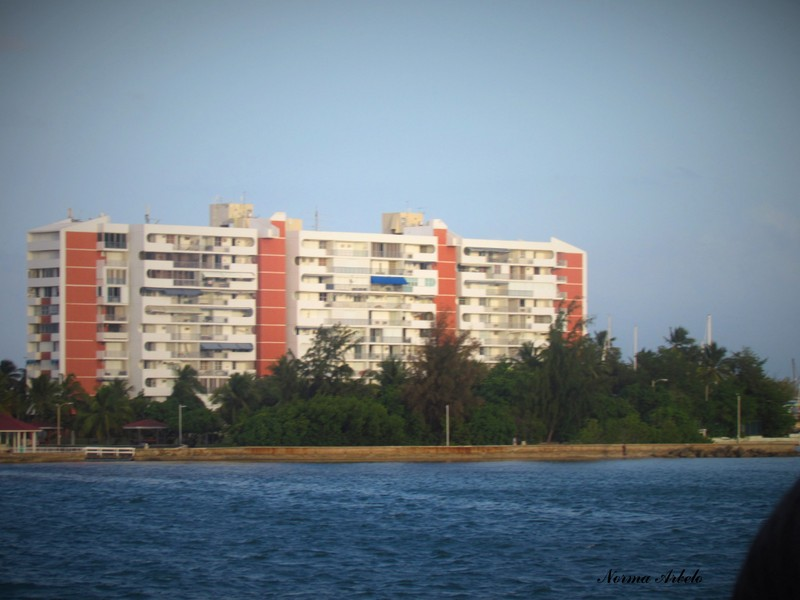
Condos on Isleta Marina, a private island of Fajardo

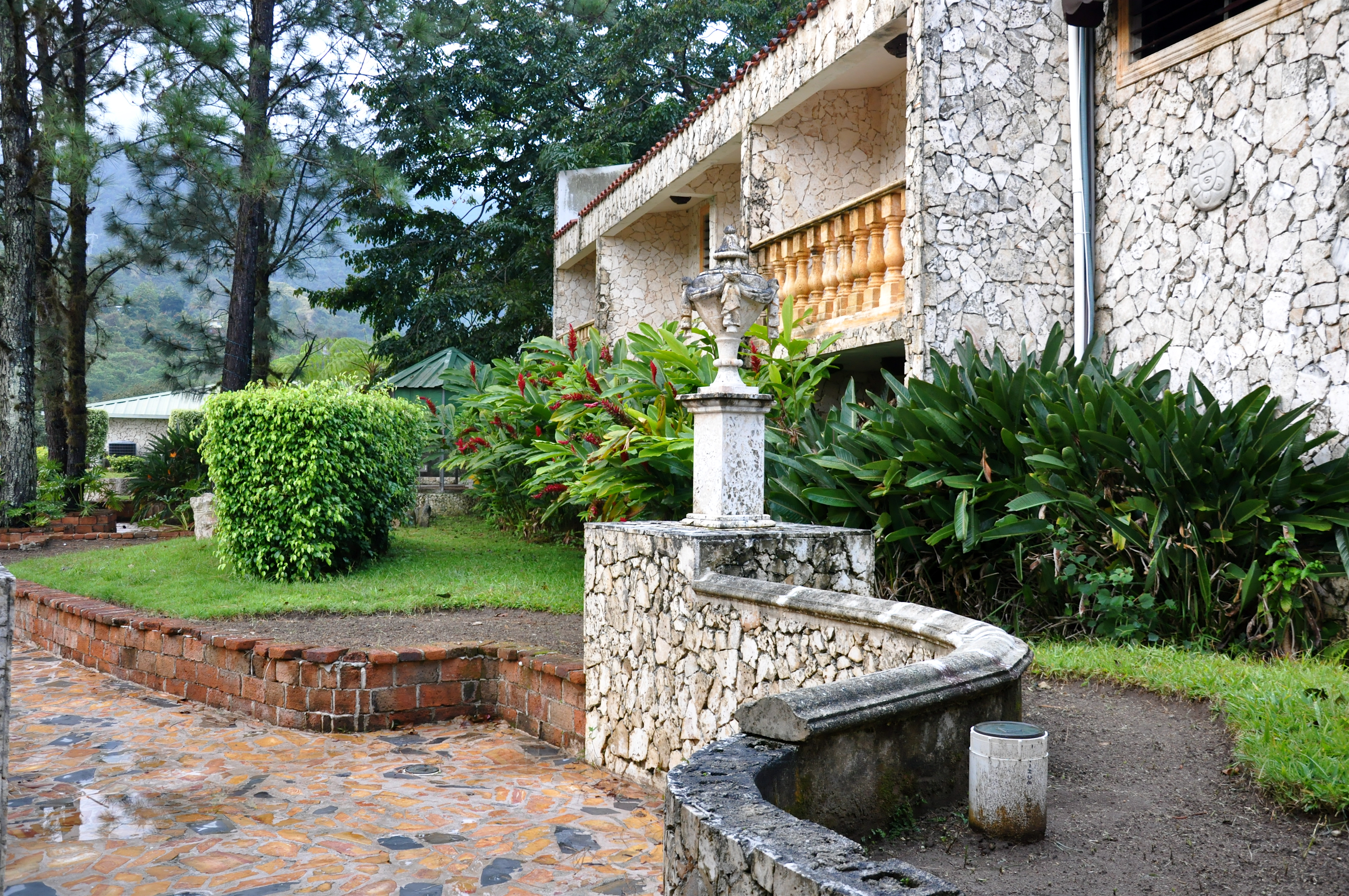
Paved walkway and building in Fajardo

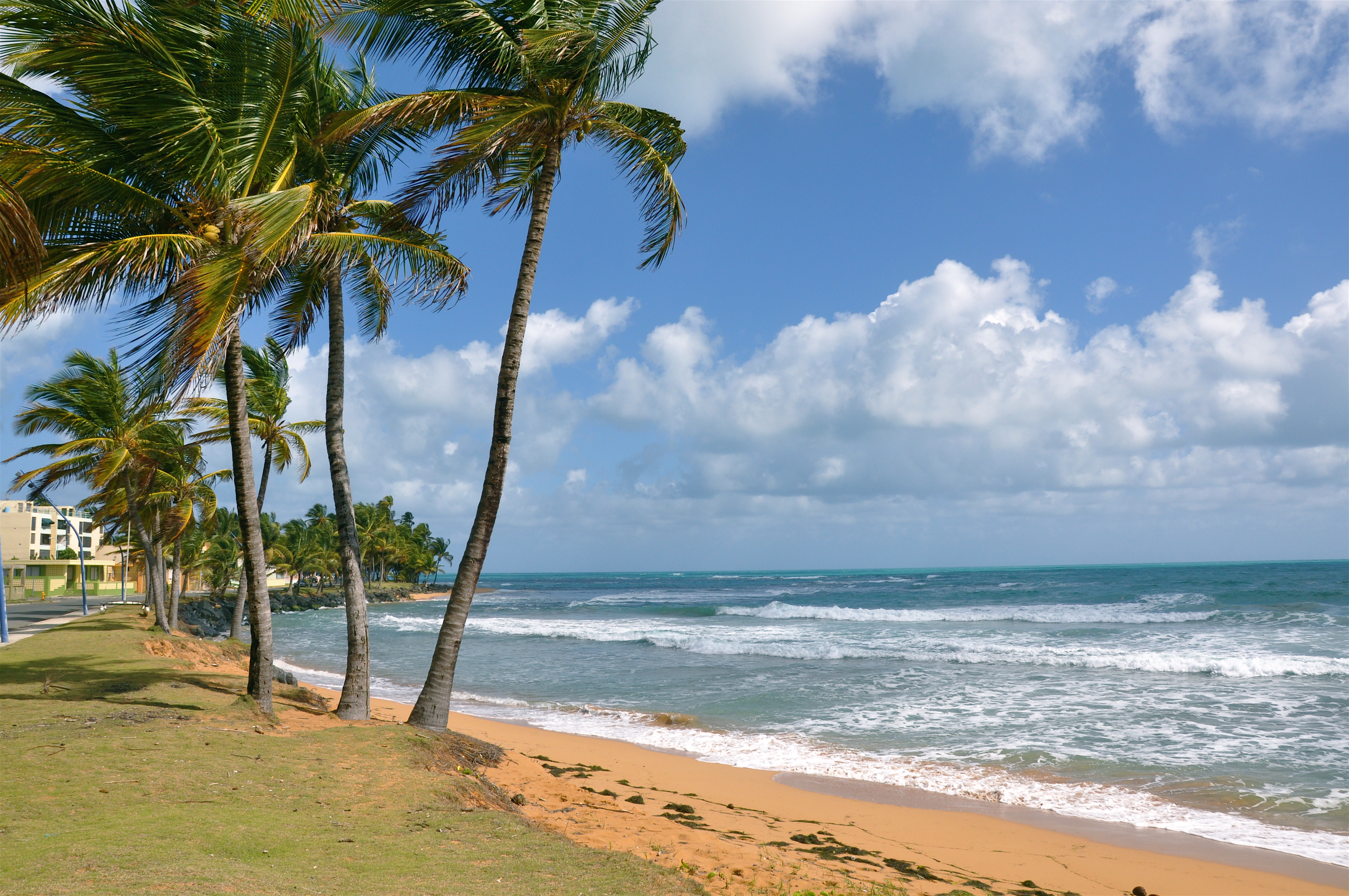
Beach in Fajardo

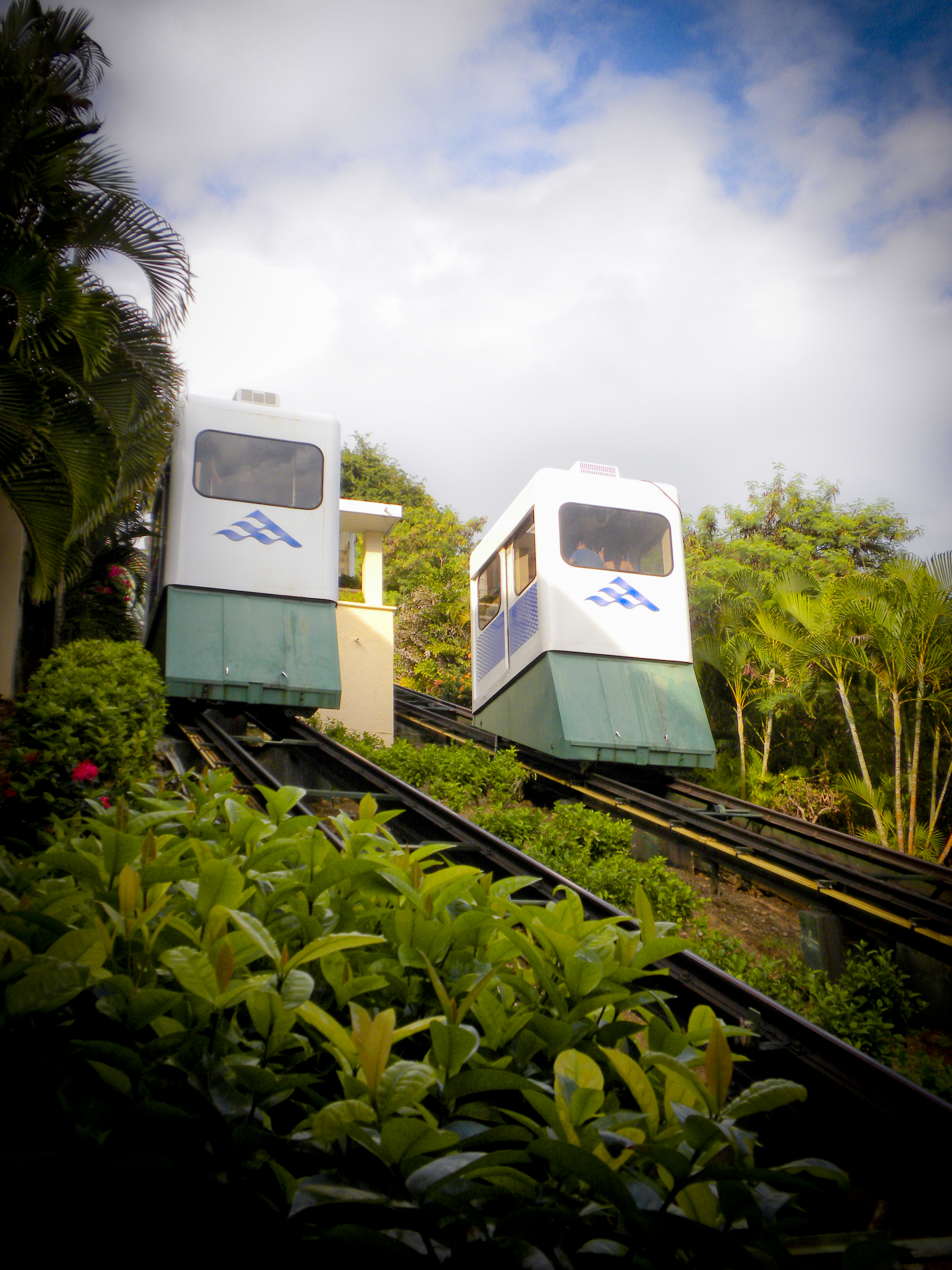
Funicular at El Conquistador Resort in Fajardo

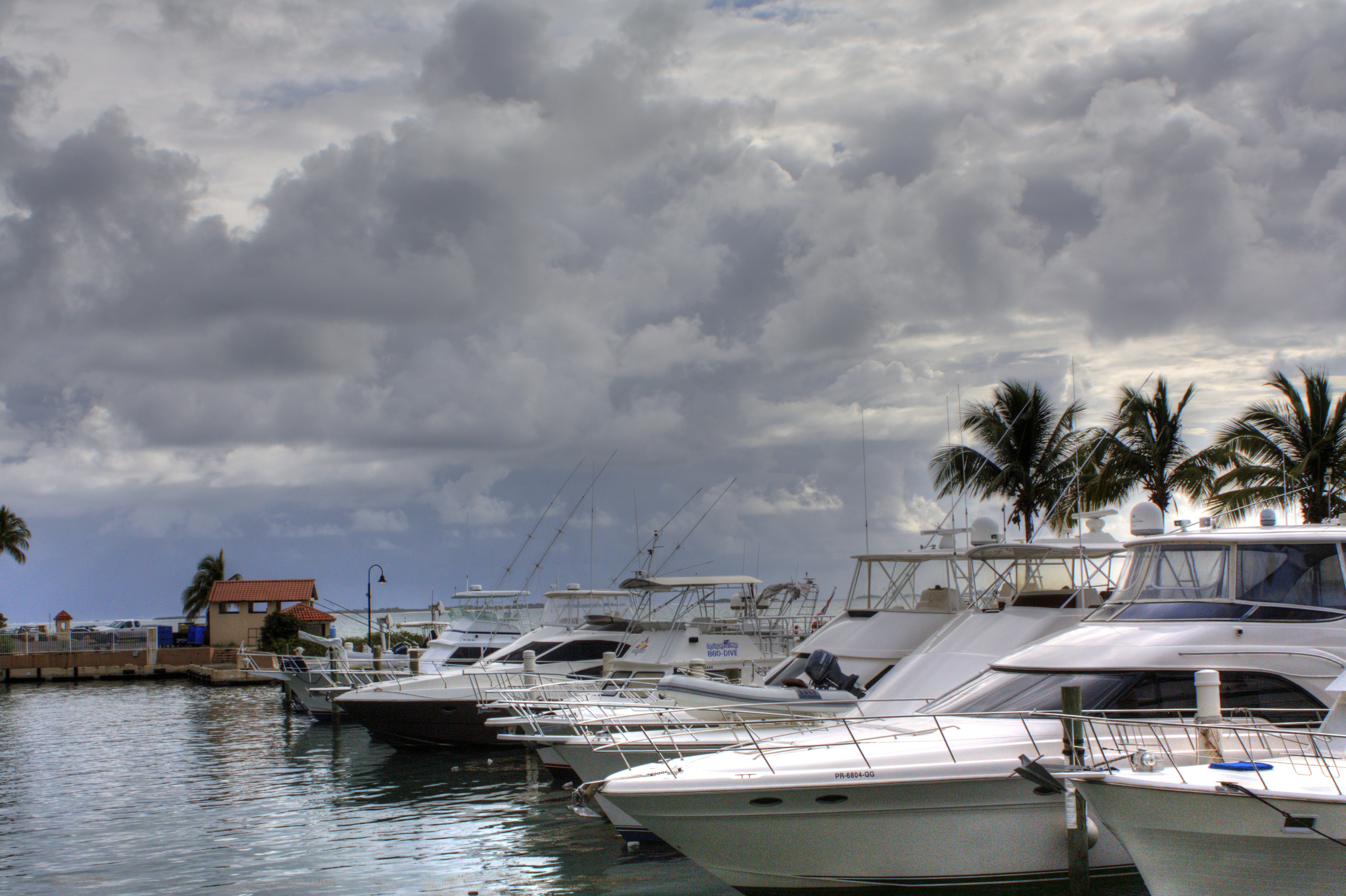
Pier at Cabezas

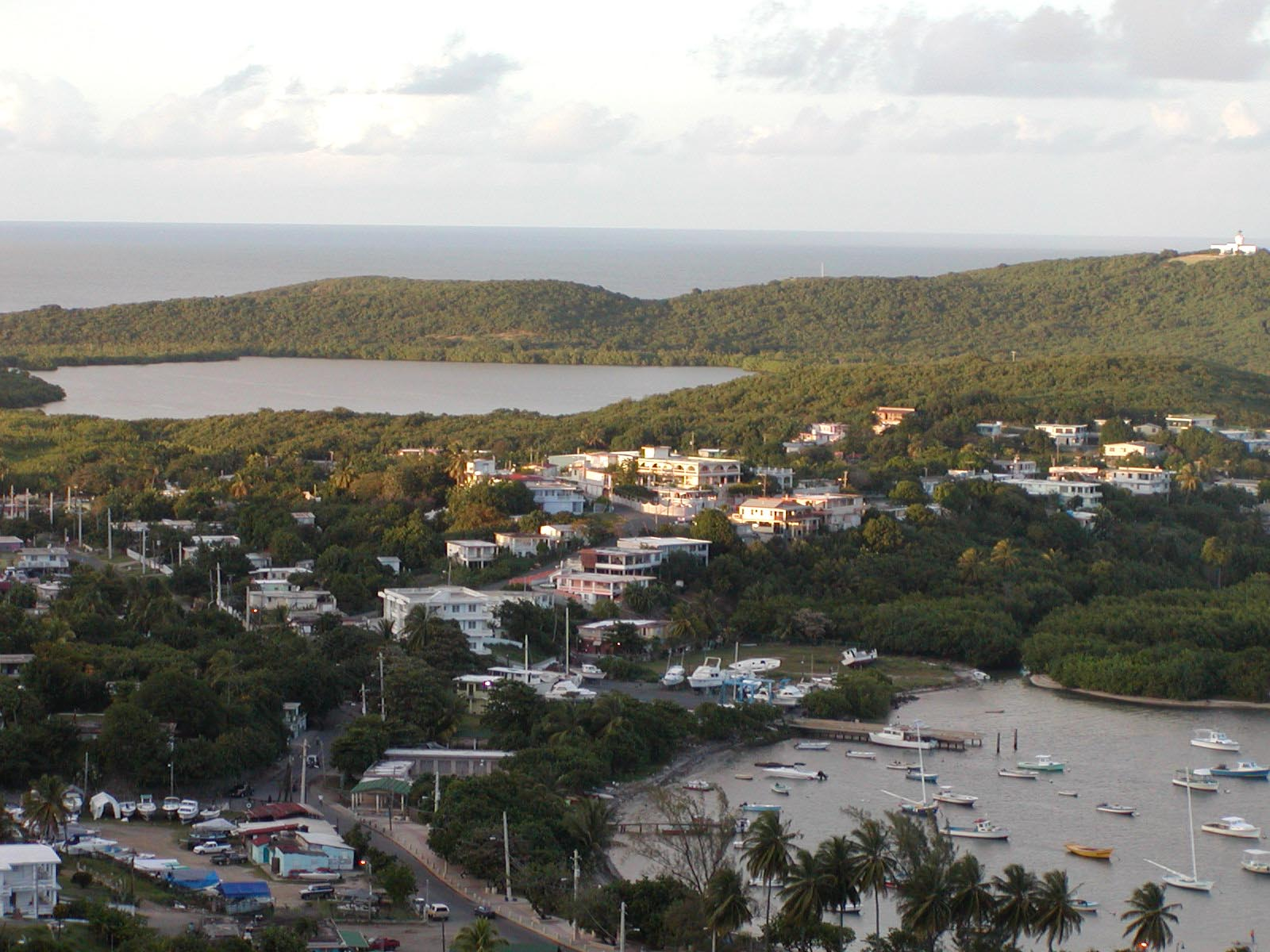
Las Croabas

== See also ==
- Battle of Fajardo
- History of Puerto Rico
- List of Puerto Ricans
