= Fajardo barrio-pueblo =

Historical and administrative center (seat) of Fajardo, Puerto Rico

Fajardo barrio-pueblo Pueblo de Fajardo
- Municipality Seat
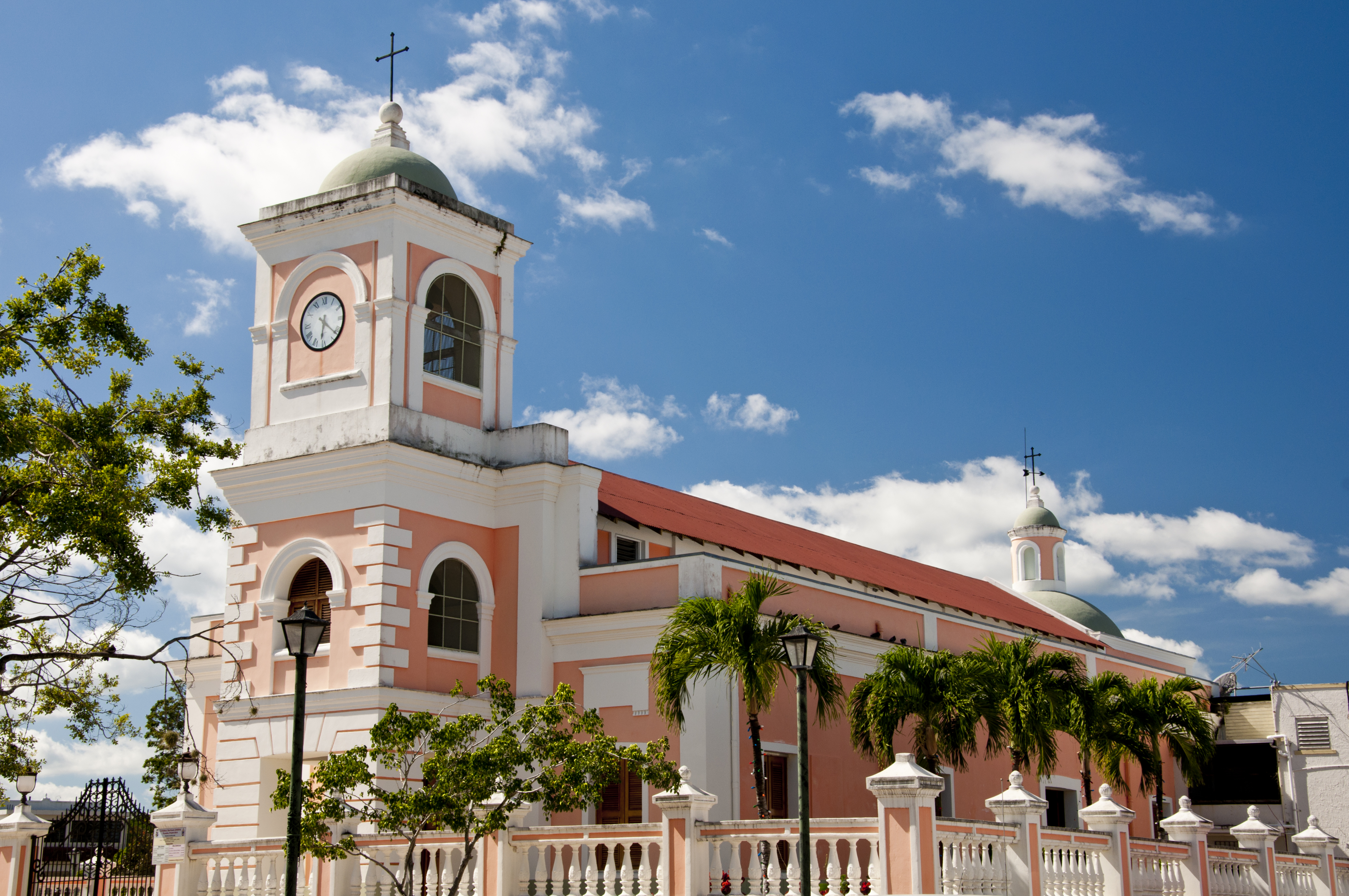
- Catedral Santiago Apóstol

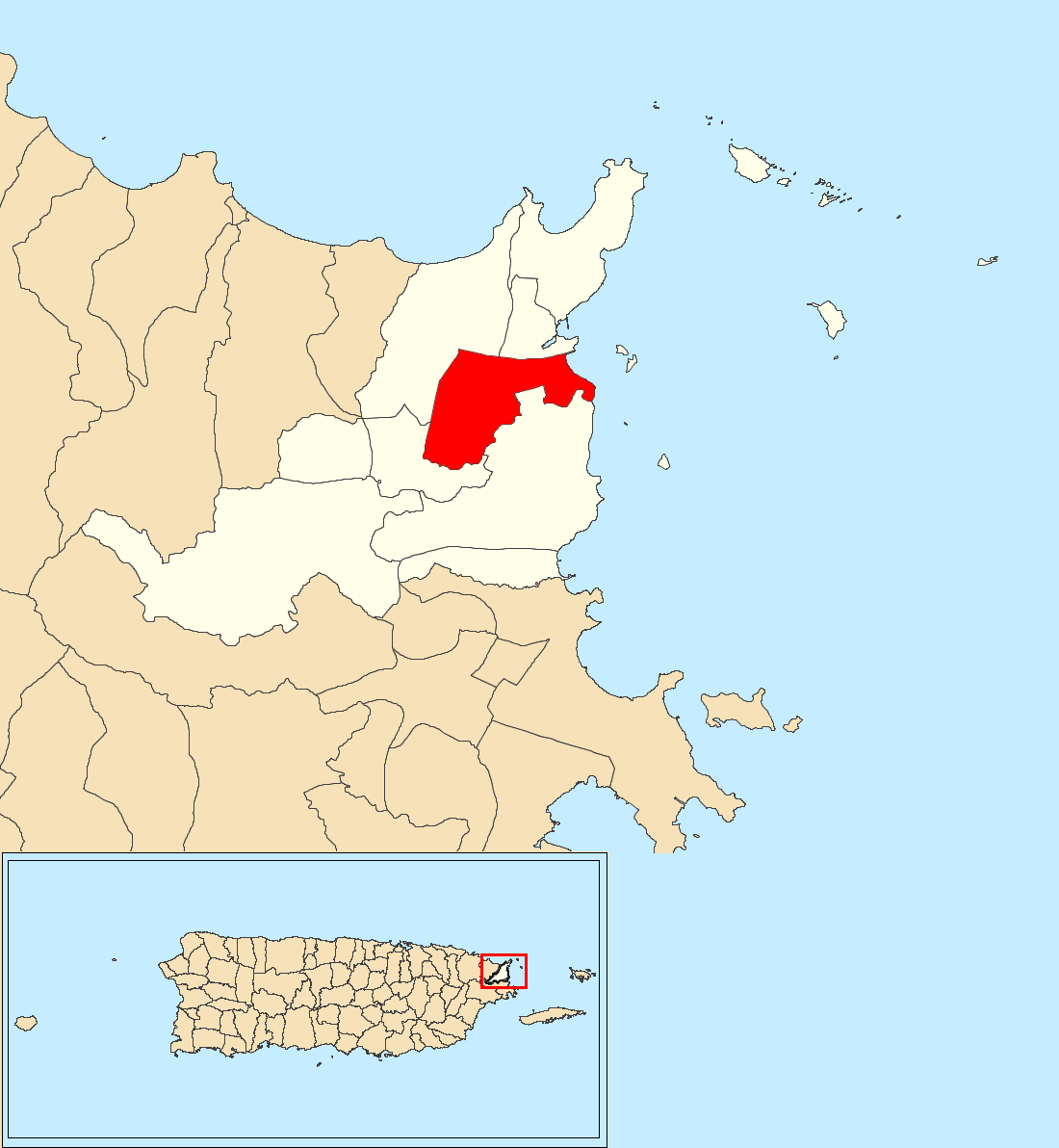
- Location of Fajardo barrio-pueblo within the municipality of Fajardo shown in red

- Location of Puerto Rico
- Coordinates: 18°19′45″N 65°38′57″W
- Commonwealth: Puerto Rico
- Municipality: Fajardo

Area
  - Total: 3.23 sq mi (8.4 km^{2})
  - Land: 2.84 sq mi (7.4 km^{2})
  - Water: 0.39 sq mi (1.0 km^{2})
- Elevation: 33 ft (10 m)

Population (2010)
  - Total: 13,709
  - Density: 4,827.1/sq mi (1,863.8/km^{2})
- Source: 2010 Census
- Time zone: UTC−4 (AST)
- ZIP Code: 00738

Fajardo barrio-pueblo is a barrio and the administrative center (seat) of Fajardo, a municipality of Puerto Rico. Its population in 2010 was 13,709.

As was customary in Spain, in Puerto Rico, the municipality has a barrio called pueblo which contains a central plaza, the municipal buildings (city hall), and a Catholic church. Fiestas patronales (patron saint festivals) are held in the central plaza every year.

== History ==
Fajardo barrio-pueblo was in Spain's gazetteers until Puerto Rico was ceded by Spain in the aftermath of the Spanish–American War under the terms of the Treaty of Paris of 1898 and became an unincorporated territory of the United States. In 1899, the United States Department of War conducted a census of Puerto Rico finding that the population of Fajardo Pueblo was 3,414.

Historical population
Census	Pop.	Note	%±
1900	3,414		—
1910	6,086		78.3%
1920	6,571		8.0%
1930	7,322		11.4%
1940	7,108		−2.9%
1950	15,336		115.8%
1960	12,409		−19.1%
1970	0		−100.0%
1980	16,403		—
1990	18,276		11.4%
2000	17,864		−2.3%
2010	13,709		−23.3%
U.S. Decennial Census; 1899 (shown as 1900) 1910-1930; 1930-1950 1980-2000 2010

== The central plaza and its church ==
The central plaza, or square, is a place for official and unofficial recreational events and a place where people can gather and socialize from dusk to dawn. The Laws of the Indies, Spanish law, which regulated life in Puerto Rico in the early 19th century, stated the plaza's purpose was for "the parties" (celebrations, festivities) (Spanish: a propósito para las fiestas), and that the square should be proportionally large enough for the number of neighbors (Spanish: grandeza proporcionada al número de vecinos). These Spanish regulations also stated that the streets nearby should be comfortable portals for passersby, protecting them from the elements: sun and rain.

The Catedral Santiago Apóstol is located in Fajardo barrio-pueblo. The parish was established in 1766 and the first church building was completed in 1776. It was destroyed by an earthquake in 1867. Construction of the present church began two years later utilizing the side walls and floor tiles of the previous church. It became a cathedral church when Pope Benedict XVI established the Diocese of Fajardo-Humacao on March 11, 2008. It is list on the U.S. National Register of Historic Places.

== Gallery ==
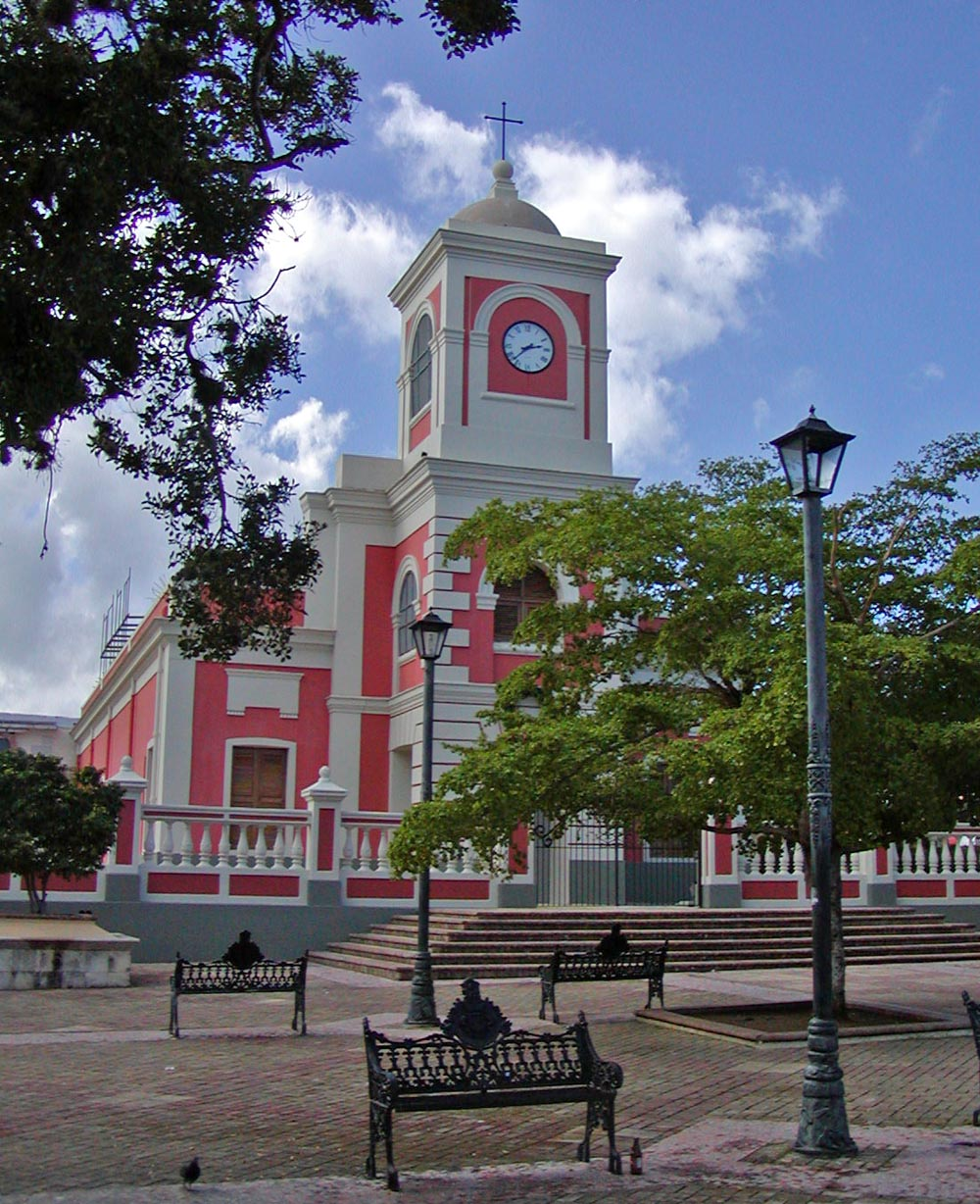
Catholic church in Fajardo barrio-pueblo

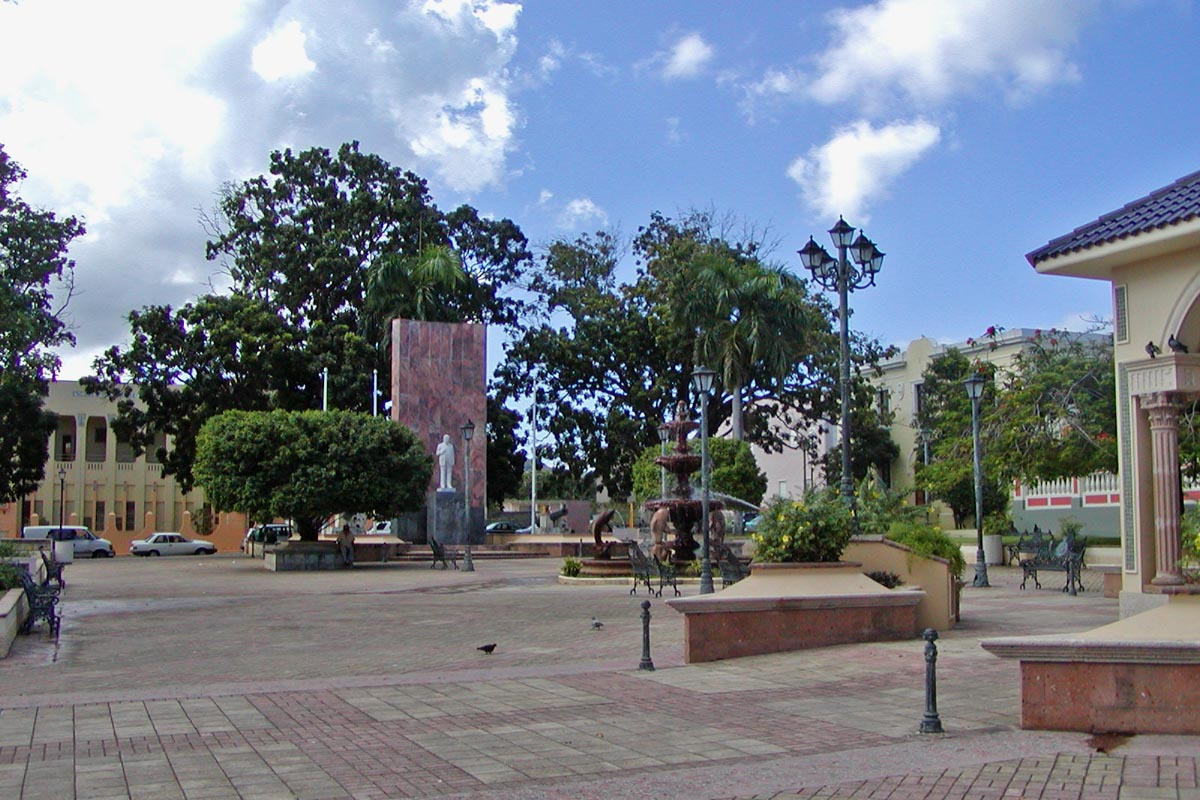
Plaza in Fajardo barrio-pueblo

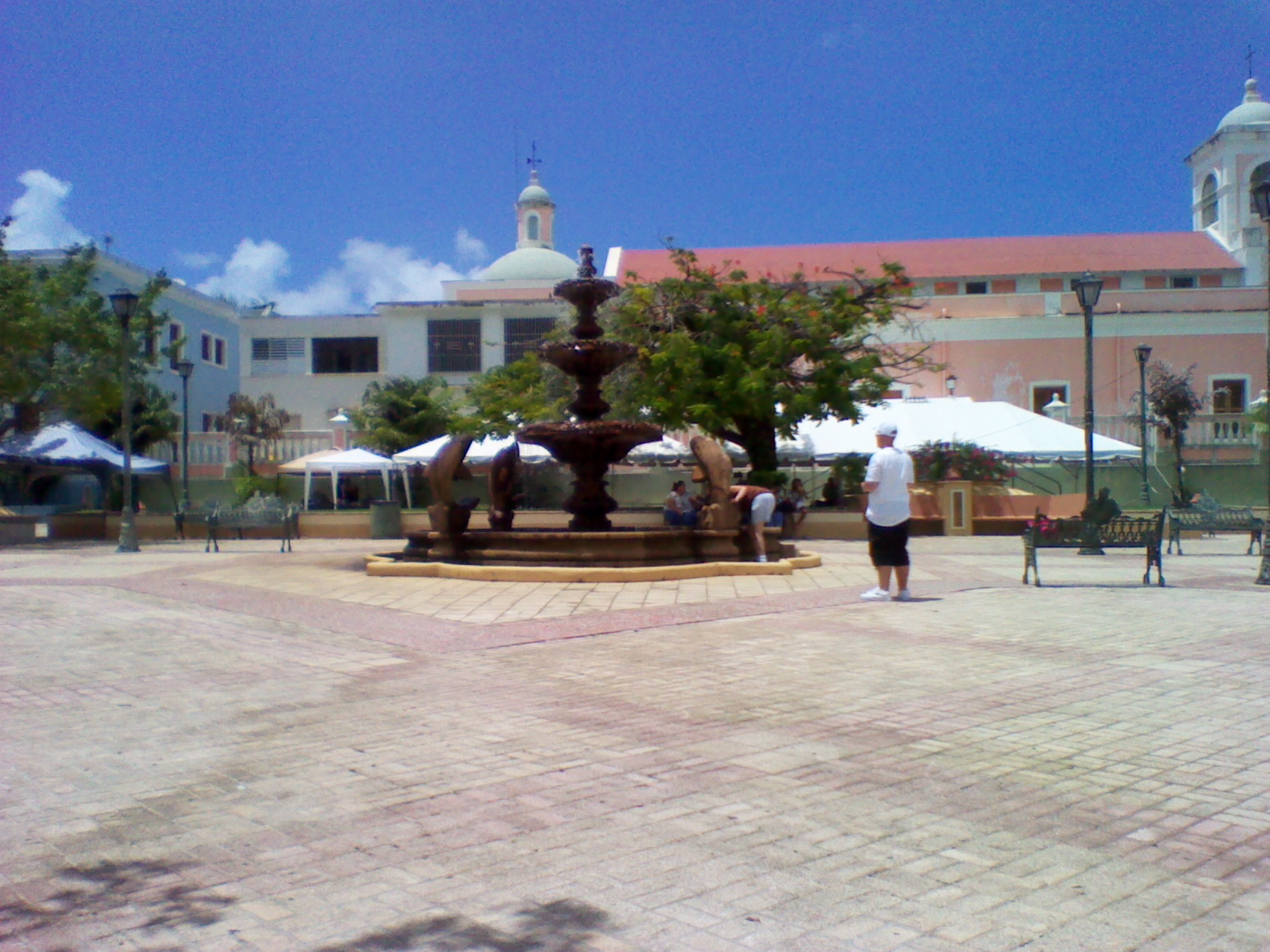
Plaza in Fajardo barrio-pueblo

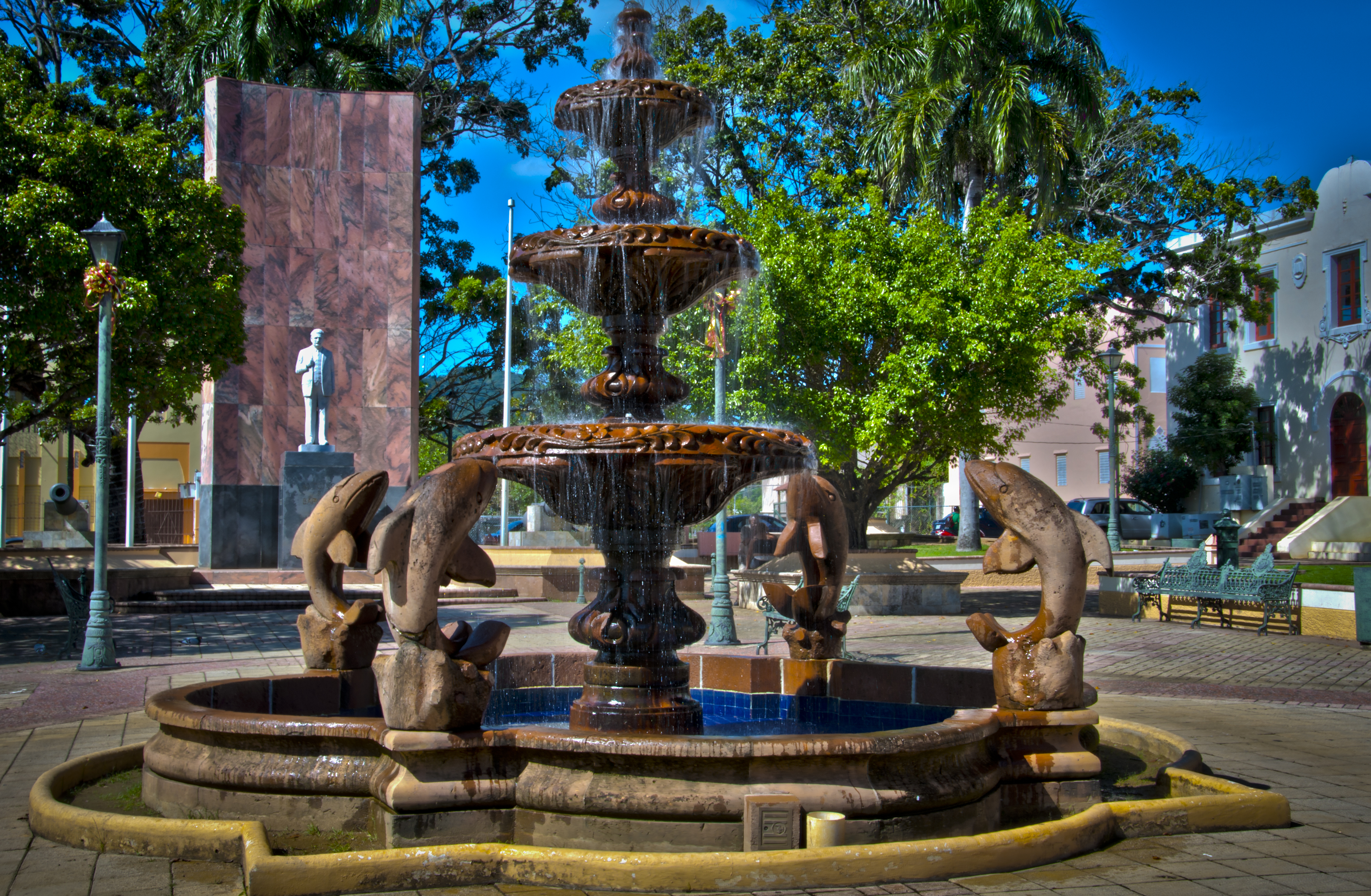
Fountain located in Fajardo's central plaza

== See also ==
- List of communities in Puerto Rico
