= Naranjo (disambiguation) =

Naranjo is a pre-Columbian Maya archaeological site in Guatemala.

Naranjo may also refer to:

== Places ==
=== Argentina ===
- El Naranjo, Salta

=== Costa Rica ===
- Naranjo (canton), in Alajuela
- Naranjo de Alajuela, in the Naranjo canton

=== Guatemala ===
- Río Naranjo (Guatemala)

=== Honduras ===
- Los Naranjos, Honduras, a pre-Columbian archaeological site

=== Mexico ===
- El Naranjo, San Luis Potosi
- El Naranjo, a community in Luvianos

=== Philippines ===
- Naranjo Islands

=== Puerto Rico ===
- Río Naranjo (Puerto Rico), a river in Puerto Rico
- Naranjo, Aguada, Puerto Rico, a barrio in Aguada, Puerto Rico
- Naranjo, Comerío, Puerto Rico, a barrio in Comerío, Puerto Rico
- Naranjo, Fajardo, Puerto Rico, a barrio in Fajardo, Puerto Rico
- Naranjo, Moca, Puerto Rico, a barrio in Moca, Puerto Rico
- Naranjo, Yauco, Puerto Rico, a barrio in Yauco, Puerto Rico

== People ==
- Alberto Naranjo (1941–2020), Venezuelan musician
- Anita Fernandini de Naranjo (1902–1982), Peruvian politician
- Bartolomé Gil Naranjo, 16th century Spanish judge in the province of Mérida, Venezuela
- Carmen Naranjo (1928–2012), Costa Rican author
- Cholly Naranjo (1934–2022), Cuban major league baseball player
- Claudio Naranjo (1932–2019), Chilean anthropologist
- Graciela Naranjo (1916–2001), Venezuelan singer
- Guadalupe Acosta Naranjo (born 1964), Mexican politician
- Javier Naranjo Villegas (1919–2014), Colombian Prelate of Roman Catholic Church
- José Naranjo (scout) (1662–1720), Pueblo Indian scout for the Kingdom of Spain
- José Naranjo (footballer, born 1926) (1926–2012), Mexican footballer
- José Naranjo (footballer, born 1994), Spanish footballer
- José Luis Naranjo y Quintana (born 1944), Mexican politician
- Juan de los Angeles Naranjo (1897–1952), Argentinian painter and draughtsman
- Lisandro Duque Naranjo (born 1943), Colombian film director
- Mónica Naranjo (born 1974), Spaniard singer
- Orlando Antonio Naranjo (born 1951), Venezuelan astronomer
- Oscar Rodríguez Naranjo (1907–2006), Colombian painter
- Rodrigo Naranjo (born 1979), Chilean footballer
- Tomás Carrasquilla Naranjo (1858–1940), Colombian writer
- William Naranjo (born 1978), Colombian long-distance runner

== Other uses ==
- Naranjo algorithm
- "El naranjo", a short story by Carlos Fuentes

== See also ==
- Naranja (disambiguation)
