= Naranja =

Naranja is a Spanish word meaning the color 'orange', or sometimes 'orange fruit', and can refer to:

- Naranja, Florida, a census-designated place
- Naranja, an orange-flavored Mexican liqueur
- Naranja, one of the two academies in Pokémon Scarlet and Violet
- Renato Naranja (born 1940), International Master of chess from the Philippines

== See also ==
- Automeris naranja, a species of moth
- La Gente Naranja, an Ecuadorian rock en español band
- Mi Media Naranja, a 1997 studio album by Labradford
- Naranja-Princeton, Florida, a former census-designated place
- Naranjas de Villa Clara, a Cuban baseball club
- Naranjo (disambiguation)
- Polygrammodes naranja, a species of moth
- Postplatyptilia naranja, a species of moth
- Vino de naranja, a Spanish white wine macerated with orange peel
