= Naranjos =

Naranjos is the plural form of naranjo, the Spanish word for orange tree. It may also refer to:

- Naranjos, Veracruz, a town in Mexico
- Naranjos Amatlán, that town's surrounding municipality
- Naranjos (Rioja), headtown of Pardo Miguel district, province of Rioja, Peru

== See also ==
- Naranjo (disambiguation)
- Los Naranjos (disambiguation)
