= Zephyria =

The name Zephyria derives from zephyr, a light wind. It can refer to:

- Zephyria, a classical albedo feature on Mars
  - Zephyria Tholus, a nearby mountain on Mars
  - Zephyria Planum, a nearby plain on Mars
- Rhagoletis zephyria, a species of fruit fly
- Adaina zephyria, a species of moth
- Automeris zephyria, an extinct species of silkworm
- Zephyria island, the fictional homeland of Zorn in the animated series Son of Zorn
