= LGN (disambiguation) =

LGN may refer to:

- Lateral geniculate nucleus, a component of the visual system in the brain's thalamus
- Longton railway station, the station code LGN
- lgn, the ISO 639-3 code for Opuo language
- La Gente Naranja, a Florida-based Ecuadorian Rock en Espanol music band
- GPSM2, a protein-coding gene (with 10 Leucine-Glycine-Asparagine repeats) in the species Homo sapiens
