= Orange wine (disambiguation) =

Orange wine is a style of wine made from white grapes fermented with the grape skins, giving the wine an amber or orange color

Orange wine may also refer to:

- Fruit wine, made from orange juice rather than grape juice
- Vino de naranja, a sweet white wine macerated with orange fruit peel
- Orange wine region of New South Wales, Australia
