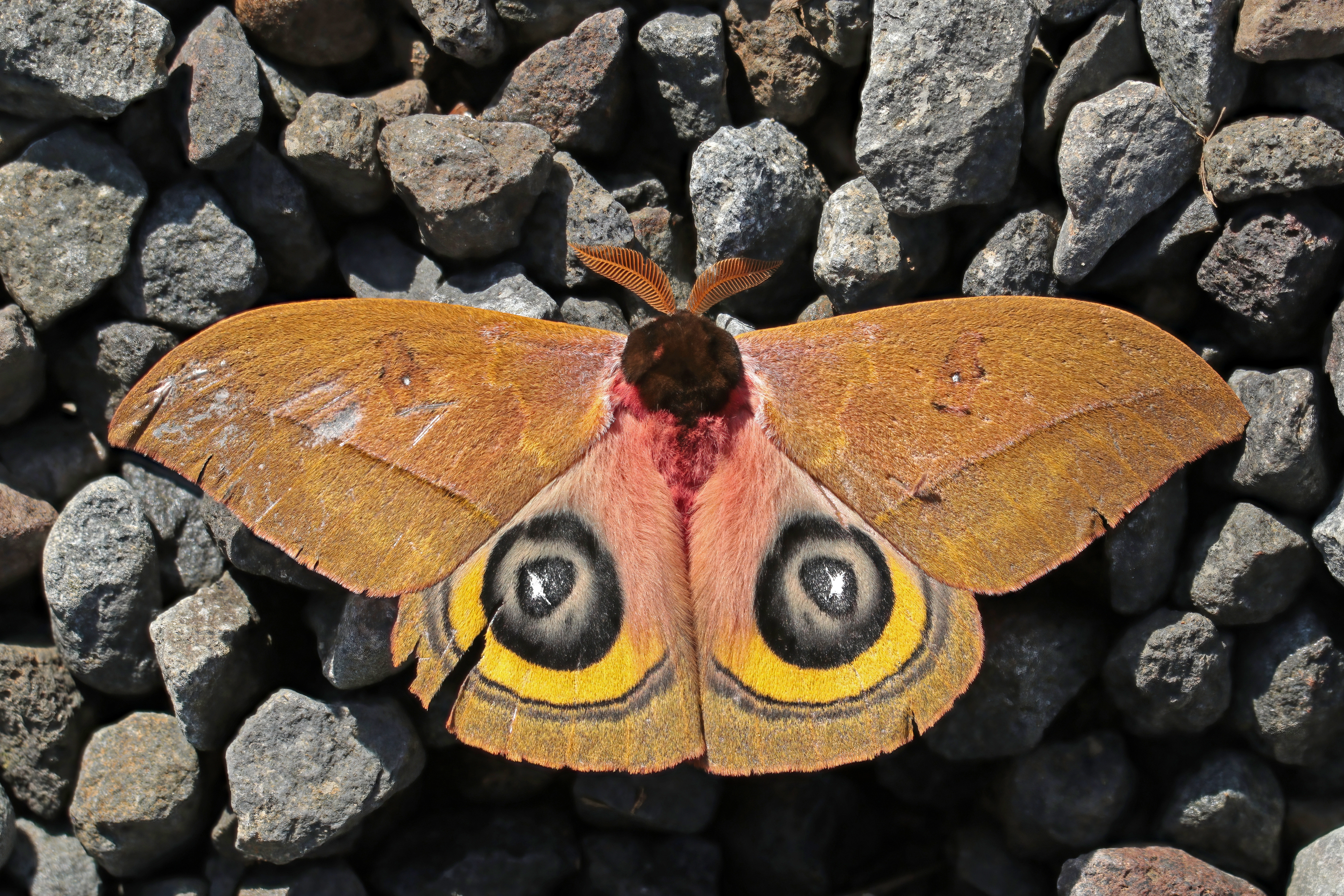
- A. b. belti Mount Totumas cloud forest, Panama

Scientific classification
- Domain: Eukaryota
- Kingdom: Animalia
- Phylum: Arthropoda
- Class: Insecta
- Order: Lepidoptera
- Family: Saturniidae
- Genus: Automeris
- Species: A. belti

Binomial name
- Automeris belti H. Druce, 1886

= Automeris belti =

Species of moth

Automeris belti is a moth of the family Saturniidae first described by Herbert Druce in 1886. A. belti is found from Mexico to Colombia and Ecuador. The wingspan is 95–100 mm.

== Subspecies ==
- Automeris belti belti (Mexico, Nicaragua, Panama)
- Automeris belti zaruma Schaus, 1921 (Ecuador)
