= Automeris celata =

Scientific classification
- Domain: Eukaryota
- Kingdom: Animalia
- Phylum: Arthropoda
- Class: Insecta
- Order: Lepidoptera
- Family: Saturniidae
- Genus: Automeris
- Species: A. celata

Binomial name
- Automeris celata Lemaire, 1969

Species of moth

Automeris celata is a moth of the family Saturniidae. It is found in the forests of tropical America, where it has been recorded from Mexico, Costa Rica, Panama and Colombia.
