= Automeris louisiana =

Scientific classification
- Kingdom: Animalia
- Phylum: Arthropoda
- Class: Insecta
- Order: Lepidoptera
- Family: Saturniidae
- Subfamily: Hemileucinae
- Genus: Automeris
- Species: A. louisiana

Binomial name
- Automeris louisiana Ferguson & Brou, 1981

Species of moth

Automeris louisiana, the Louisiana eyed silkmoth, is a species of moth in the family Saturniidae. It is found in North America.

The MONA or Hodges number for Automeris louisiana is 7749.1.

ITIS Taxonomic note:

- US ESA: Petition to list as threatened or endangered substantial and initiating status review according to 90-day petition finding, as published in Federal Register Volume 76, Number 187, Pages 59836 - 59862, September 27, 2011.
