= Automeris anikmeisterae =

Scientific classification
- Kingdom: Animalia
- Phylum: Arthropoda
- Class: Insecta
- Order: Lepidoptera
- Family: Saturniidae
- Genus: Automeris
- Species: A. anikmeisterae

Binomial name
- Automeris anikmeisterae Brechlin & Meister, 2011

Species of moth

Automeris anikmeisterae is a moth of the family Saturniidae. It is found in Nicaragua and Costa Rica.
