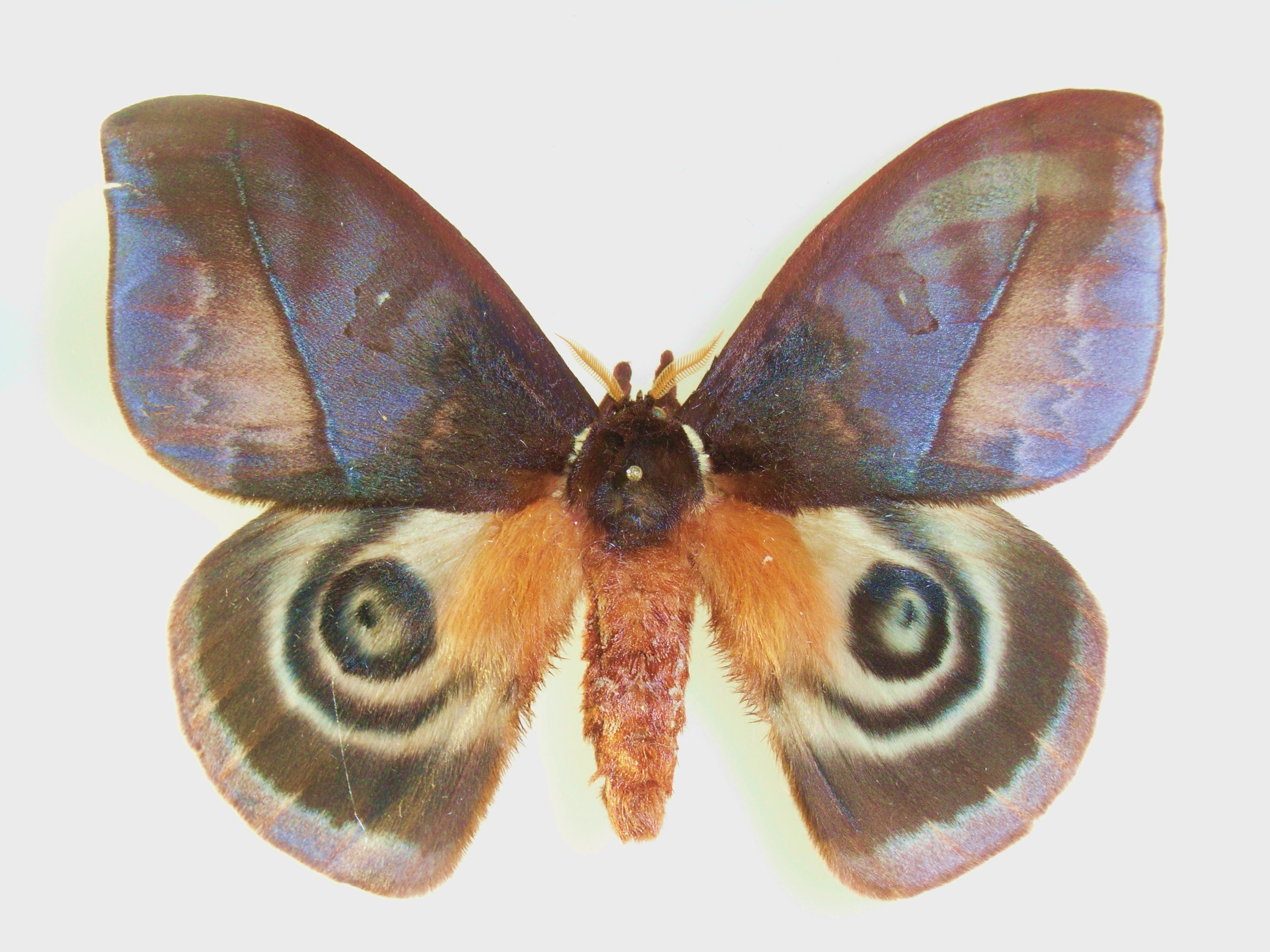

Scientific classification
- Kingdom: Animalia
- Phylum: Arthropoda
- Class: Insecta
- Order: Lepidoptera
- Family: Saturniidae
- Genus: Automeris
- Species: A. larra

Binomial name
- Automeris larra (Walker, 1855)

Synonyms
- Hyperchiria larra Walker, 1855

= Automeris larra =

Species of moth

Automeris larra is a moth of the family Saturniidae. It is found in South America, including Brazil, French Guiana, Venezuela, Colombia, Peru, Bolivia and Ecuador.

== Subspecies ==
- Automeris larra larra
- Automeris larra eitschbergeri (Peru, Ecuador)
