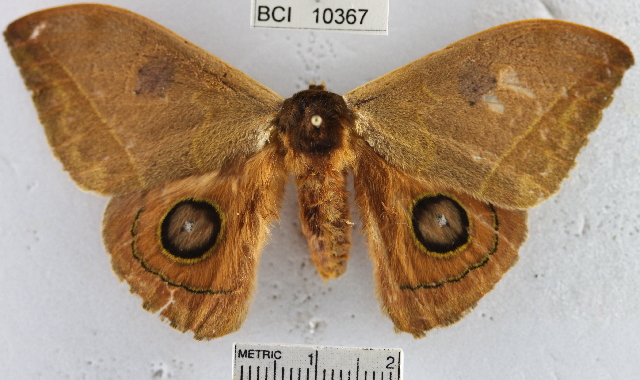

Scientific classification
- Domain: Eukaryota
- Kingdom: Animalia
- Phylum: Arthropoda
- Class: Insecta
- Order: Lepidoptera
- Family: Saturniidae
- Genus: Automeris
- Species: A. duchartrei

Binomial name
- Automeris duchartrei Bouvier, 1936

= Automeris duchartrei =

Species of moth

Automeris duchartrei is a moth of the family Saturniidae first described by Eugène Louis Bouvier in 1936. It is found in Ecuador, Bolivia and Peru.

The wingspan is 70–80 mm.
