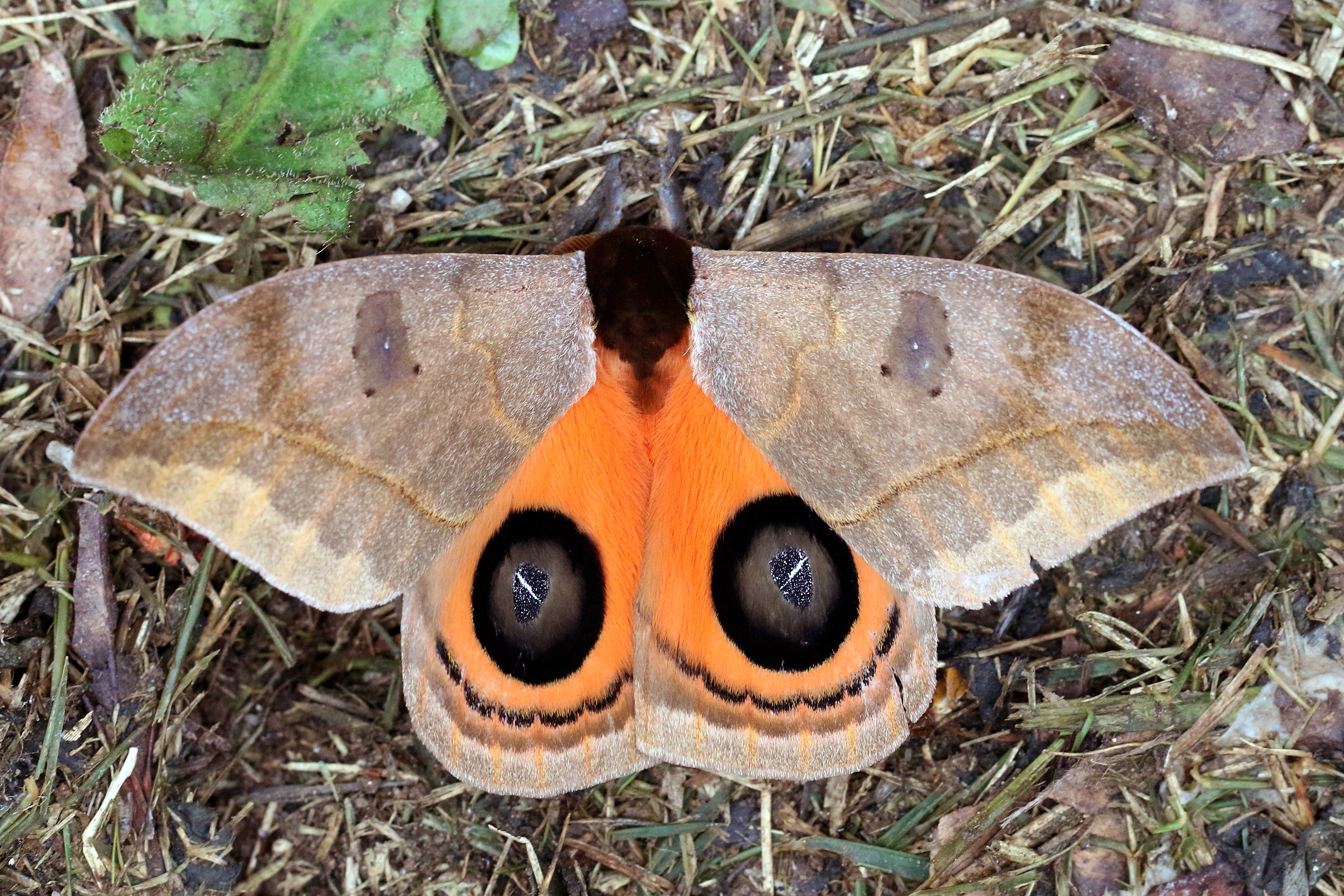

Scientific classification
- Domain: Eukaryota
- Kingdom: Animalia
- Phylum: Arthropoda
- Class: Insecta
- Order: Lepidoptera
- Family: Saturniidae
- Genus: Automeris
- Species: A. amanda

Binomial name
- Automeris amanda Schaus, 1900

= Automeris amanda =

Species of moth

Automeris amanda, commonly known as the peacock silkmoth or peacock moth, is a species of moth in the family Saturniidae. It is indigenous to South America.

== Subspecies ==
- Automeris amanda tucimana
- Automeris amanda amanda
- Automeris amanda amandocuscoensis
- Automeris amanda limpida
- Automeris amanda tucuman
- Automeris amanda amandojunica
- Automeris amanda subobscura
