= Automeris randa =

Scientific classification
- Domain: Eukaryota
- Kingdom: Animalia
- Phylum: Arthropoda
- Class: Insecta
- Order: Lepidoptera
- Family: Saturniidae
- Genus: Automeris
- Species: A. randa

Binomial name
- Automeris randa H. Druce, 1894

Species of moth

Automeris randa, Rand's eyed silk moth, is a species of buck and io moths in the family Saturniidae. It was described by Herbert Druce in 1894 and is found in Central and North America.

The MONA or Hodges number for Automeris randa is 7745.
