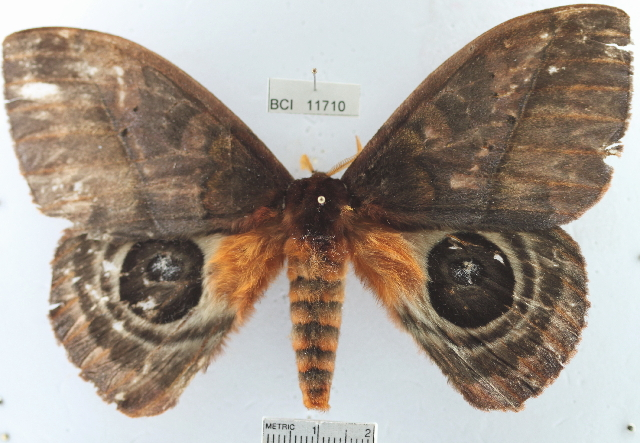

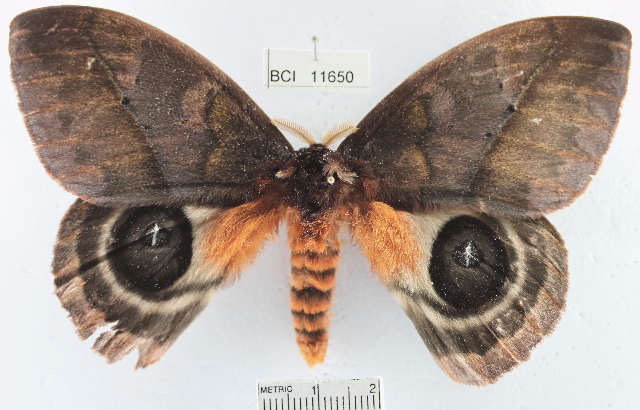

Scientific classification
- Domain: Eukaryota
- Kingdom: Animalia
- Phylum: Arthropoda
- Class: Insecta
- Order: Lepidoptera
- Family: Saturniidae
- Genus: Automeris
- Species: A. postalbida

Binomial name
- Automeris postalbida Schaus, 1900

= Automeris postalbida =

Species of moth

Automeris postalbida is a moth of the family Saturniidae first described by William Schaus in 1900. It is found from Costa Rica to Ecuador.
