= Automeris styx =

Scientific classification
- Kingdom: Animalia
- Phylum: Arthropoda
- Class: Insecta
- Order: Lepidoptera
- Family: Saturniidae
- Genus: Automeris
- Species: A. styx

Binomial name
- Automeris styx Lemaire, 1982

Species of moth

Automeris styx is a species of moth of the family Saturniidae. It was discovered by Claude Lemaire in 1982. It is found in northern South American countries including Peru, French Guiana, Ecuador and Bolivia.
