= Automeris patagoniensis =

Scientific classification
- Kingdom: Animalia
- Phylum: Arthropoda
- Class: Insecta
- Order: Lepidoptera
- Family: Saturniidae
- Subfamily: Hemileucinae
- Genus: Automeris
- Species: A. patagoniensis

Binomial name
- Automeris patagoniensis Lemaire, M. J. Smith & Wolfe, 1992

Species of moth

Automeris patagoniensis, the Patagonia eyed silkmoth, is a species of insect in the family Saturniidae. It is found in North America.

The MONA or Hodges number for Automeris patagoniensis is 7749.2.
