= Automeris godartii =

Scientific classification
- Kingdom: Animalia
- Phylum: Arthropoda
- Class: Insecta
- Order: Lepidoptera
- Family: Saturniidae
- Genus: Automeris
- Species: A. godartii

Binomial name
- Automeris godartii (Boisduval, 1875)

Synonyms
- Io godartii Boisduval, 1875

Species of moth

Automeris godartii, or Godart's bullseye moth, is a species of moth in the family Saturniidae and the subfamily Hemileucinae. The scientific name of the species was first published in 1875 by Jean Baptiste Boisduval. It is found in French Guiana, Peru and Venezuela.
