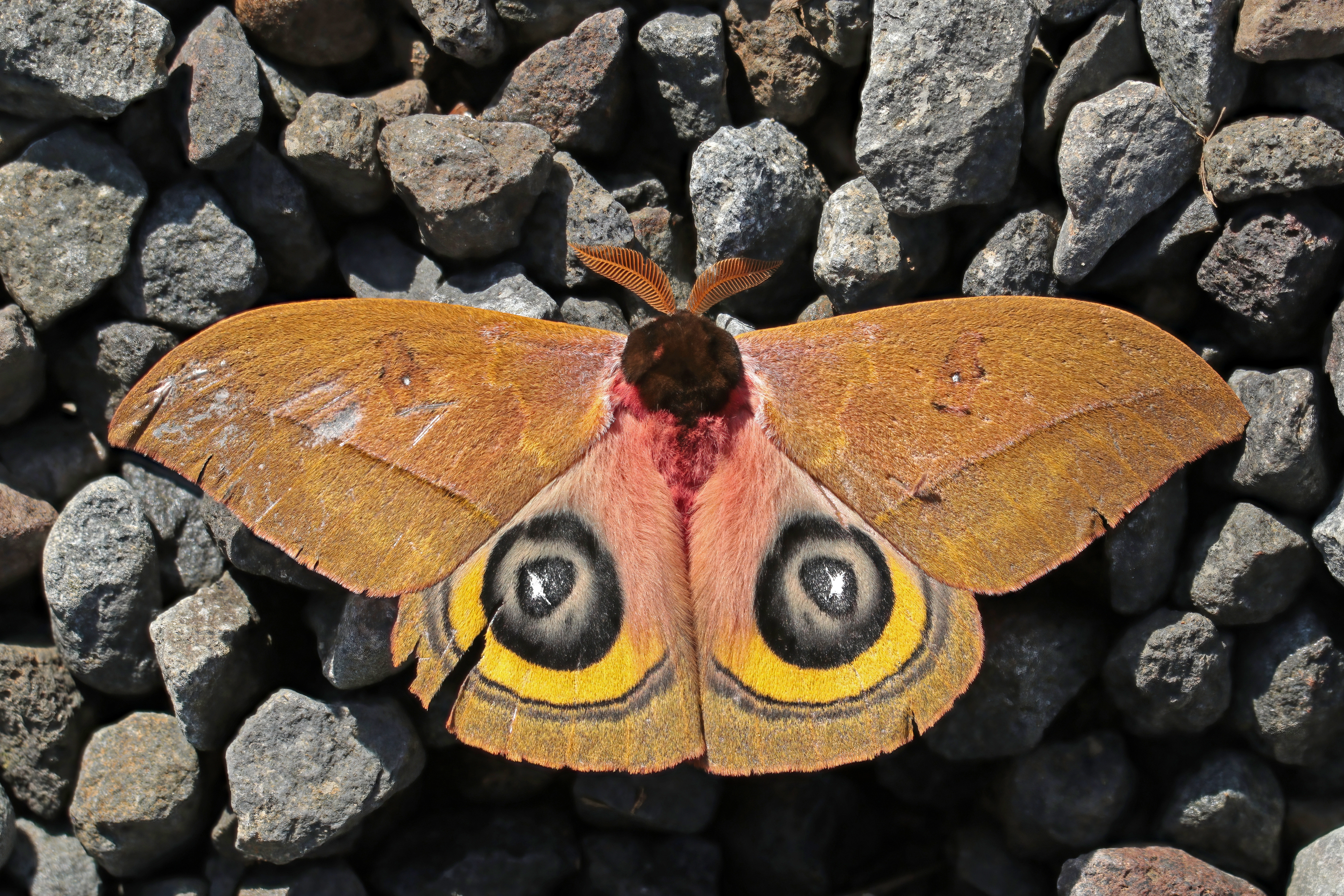
- A. b. belti Mount Totumas cloud forest, Panama
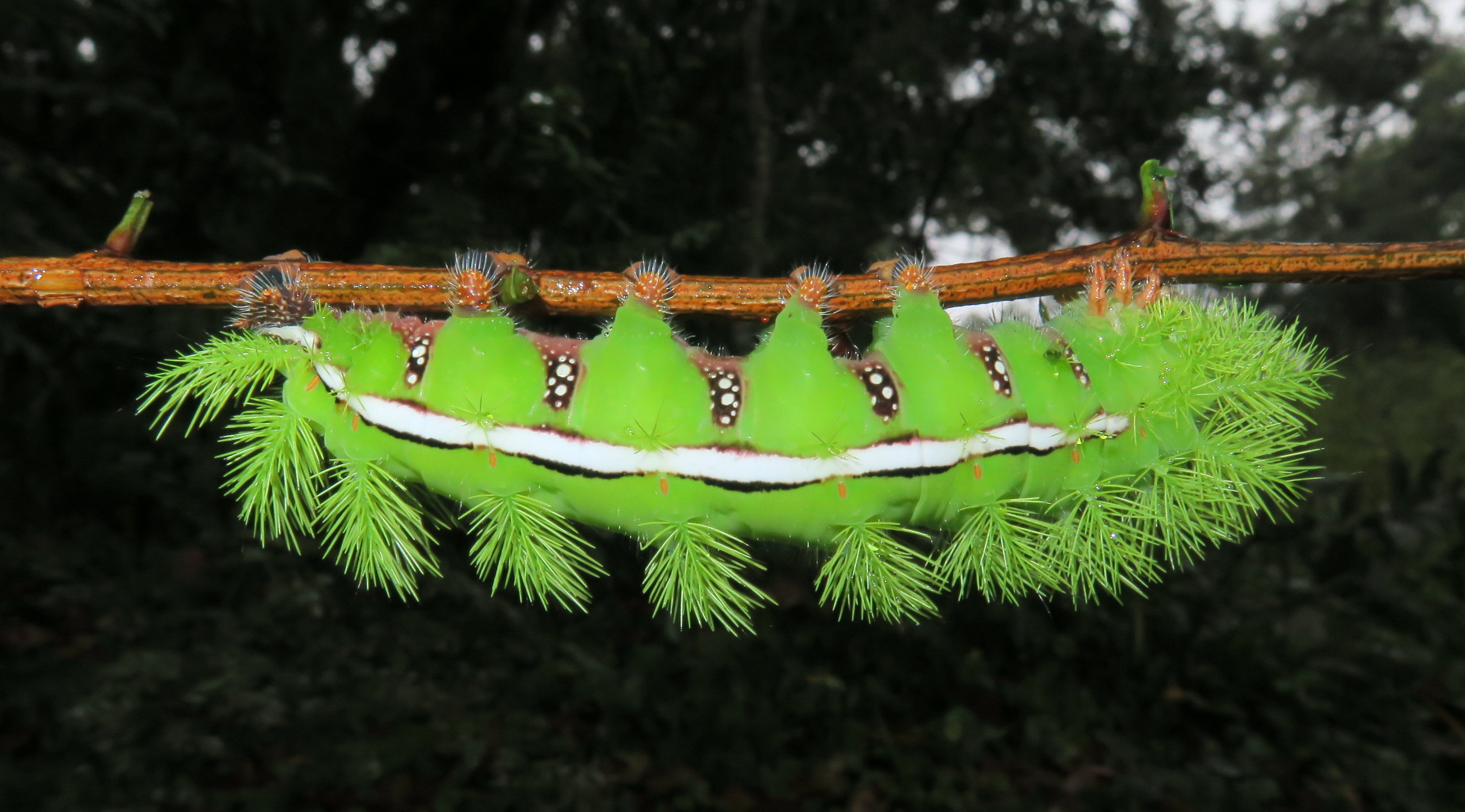
- Automeris io caterpillar

Scientific classification
- Kingdom: Animalia
- Phylum: Arthropoda
- Clade: Pancrustacea
- Class: Insecta
- Order: Lepidoptera
- Family: Saturniidae
- Subfamily: Hemileucinae
- Genus: Automeris; Hübner, [1819]

Synonyms
- Protautomeris Packard, 1903; Agliopsis Bouvier, 1929

= Automeris =

Genus of moths

A. illustris, Sao Paulo

Automeris is a genus of moths in the family Saturniidae and the subfamily Hemileucinae. As of 1996 there were 124 species, and more have since been described. These moths are generally characterized by the eyelike patches on the hindwings and the leaflike pattern on the forewings, an example of crypsis. The genus was first described by Jacob Hübner in 1819 and it is distributed in the Neotropical realm.

== List of species ==
- Automeris abdominalis (R. Felder & Rogenhofer, 1874)
- Automeris ahuitzotli Lemaire & Wolfe, 1993
- Automeris alticola Lemaire, 1975
- Automeris amanda Schaus, 1900 – peacock silkmoth
- Automeris amoena (Boisduval, 1875)
- Automeris andicola Bouvier, 1930
- Automeris anikmeisterae Brechlin & Meister, 2011
- Automeris annulata Schaus, 1906
- Automeris arminia (Stoll, 1781)
- Automeris atrolimbata Lemaire, 2002
- Automeris averna Druce, 1886
- Automeris balachowskyi Lemaire, 1966
- Automeris banus (Boisduval, 1875)
- Automeris basalis (Walker, 1855)
- Automeris beckeri (Herrich-Schäffer, 1856)
- Automeris belti Druce, 1886
- Automeris beutelspacheri Lemaire, 2002
- Automeris bilinea (Walker, 1855)
- Automeris boops (R. Felder & Rogenhofer, 1874)
- Automeris boucardi Druce, 1886
- Automeris boudinoti Lemaire, 1982
- Automeris boudinotiana Lemaire, 1986
- Automeris castrensis Schaus, 1898
- Automeris caucensis Lemaire, 1976
- Automeris cecrops (Boisduval, 1875)
- Automeris celata Lemaire, 1969
- Automeris chacona Draudt, 1929
- Automeris chaconoides Brechlin & Meister, 2008
- Automeris cinctistriga (R. Felder & Rogenhofer, 1874)
- Automeris claryi Naumann, Brosch & Wenczel, 2005
- Automeris colenon Dyar, 1912
- Automeris complicata (Walker, 1855)
- Automeris coresus Boisduval, 1859
- Automeris cryptica Dognin, 1911
- Automeris curvilinea Schaus, 1906
- Automeris dandemon Dyar, 1912
- Automeris daudiana Druce, 1894
- Automeris denhezorum Lemaire, 1966
- Automeris denticulata Conte, 1906
- Automeris descimoni Lemaire, 1972
- Automeris despicata Draudt, 1929
- Automeris diavolanda Naumann, Brosch & Wenczel, 2005
- Automeris dognini Lemaire, 1967
- Automeris duchartrei Bouvier, 1936
- Automeris egeus (Cramer, 1775)
- Automeris elenensis Lemaire, 2002
- Automeris eogena (R. Felder & Rogenhofer, 1874)
- Automeris escalantei Lemaire, 1969
- Automeris exigua Lemaire, 1977
- Automeris excreta Draudt, 1929
- Automeris falco Jordan, 1910
- Automeris fieldi Lemaire, 1969
- Automeris fletcheri Lemaire, 1966
- Automeris gabriellae Lemaire, 1966
- Automeris godartii (Boisduval, 1875)
- Automeris goodsoni Lemaire, 1966
- Automeris grammodes Jordan, 1910
- Automeris granulosa Conte, 1906
- Automeris hamata Schaus, 1906
- Automeris harrisorum Lemaire, 1967
- Automeris haxairei Herbin, 2003
- Automeris hebe (Walker, 1865)
- Automeris heppneri Lemaire, 1982
- Automeris iguaquensis Lemaire & Amarillo, 1992
- Automeris illustris (Walker, 1855)
- Automeris incarnata (Walker, 1865)
- Automeris innoxia Schaus, 1906
- Automeris inornata (Walker, 1855)
- Automeris io (Fabricius, 1775)
- Automeris iris (Walker, 1865)
- Automeris janus (Cramer, 1775)
- Automeris jivaros Dognin, 1890
- Automeris jucunda (Cramer, 1779)
- Automeris jucundoides Schaus, 1906
- Automeris kopturae Lemaire, 1982
- Automeris labriquei Naumann, Brosch & Wenczel, 2005
- Automeris lachaumei Lemaire, 2002
- Automeris larra (Walker, 1855)
- Automeris lauroia Oiticica Filho, 1965
- Automeris lauta F. Johnson & Michener, 1948
- Automeris lecourti Decaens & Herbin, 2002
- Automeris lemairei Beutelspacher, 1990
- Automeris liberia (Cramer, 1780)
- Automeris louisiana Ferguson & Brou, 1981
- Automeris macphaili Schaus, 1921
- Automeris maeonia (Druce, 1897)
- Automeris manantlanensis Balcazar, 2000
- Automeris margaritae Lemaire, 1967
- Automeris masti Lemaire, 1972
- Automeris melanops (Walker, 1865)
- Automeris melmon Dyar, 1912
- Automeris meridionalis Bouvier, 1934
- Automeris metzli (Salle, 1853)
- Automeris micheneri Lemaire, 1966
- Automeris michoacana Balcazar, 2000
- Automeris midea (Maassen & Weyding, 1885)
- Automeris moloneyi Druce, 1897
- Automeris montezuma (Boisduval, 1875)
- Automeris moresca Schaus, 1906
- Automeris muscula (Vuillot, 1892)
- Automeris napoensis Lemaire, 2002
- Automeris naranja Schaus, 1898
- Automeris nebulosa Conte, 1906
- Automeris niepelti Draudt, 1929
- Automeris nubila (Walker, 1855)
- Automeris oaxacensis Lemaire, 2002
- Automeris oberthurii (Boisduval, 1875)
- Automeris oiticicai Lemaire, 1966
- Automeris orestes (Boisduval, 1875)
- Automeris ovalina Conte, 1906
- Automeris pallidior Draudt, 1929
- Automeris papallactensis Syn.: Automeris iwanowitschi Brechlin, Käch & Meister, 2013
- Automeris paramaculata Lemaire, 1966
- Automeris patagoniensis Lemaire, M.J. Smith & Wolfe, 1992
- Automeris phrynon Druce, 1897
- Automeris pomifera Schaus, 1906
- Automeris postalbida Schaus, 1900
- Automeris praemargaritae Lemaire, 2002
- Automeris randa Druce, 1894
- Automeris rectilinea Bouvier, 1927
- Automeris rostralis Lemaire, 2002
- Automeris rougeoti Lemaire, 1967
- Automeris schwartzi Lemaire, 1967
- Automeris stacieae Lemaire & Wolfe, 1993
- Automeris styx Lemaire, 1982
- Automeris submacula (Walker, 1855)
- Automeris subobscura Weymer 1909
- Automeris suteri Naumann, Brosch & Wenczel, 2005
- Automeris sylviae Decaens, 2005
- Automeris tamsi Lemaire, 1966
- Automeris tatiae Naumann, Brosch & Wenczel, 2005
- Automeris themis Dognin, 1919
- Automeris tridens Herrich-Schäffer, 1855
- Automeris tristis (Boisduval, 1875)
- Automeris vomona Schaus, 1906
- Automeris watsoni Lemaire, 1966
- Automeris wayampi Lemaire & Beneluz, 2002
- Automeris windiana Lemaire, 1972
- Automeris zephyria (Grote, 1882)
- Automeris zozine Druce, 1886
- Automeris zugana Druce, 1886
- Automeris zurobara Druce, 1886

== Gallery ==
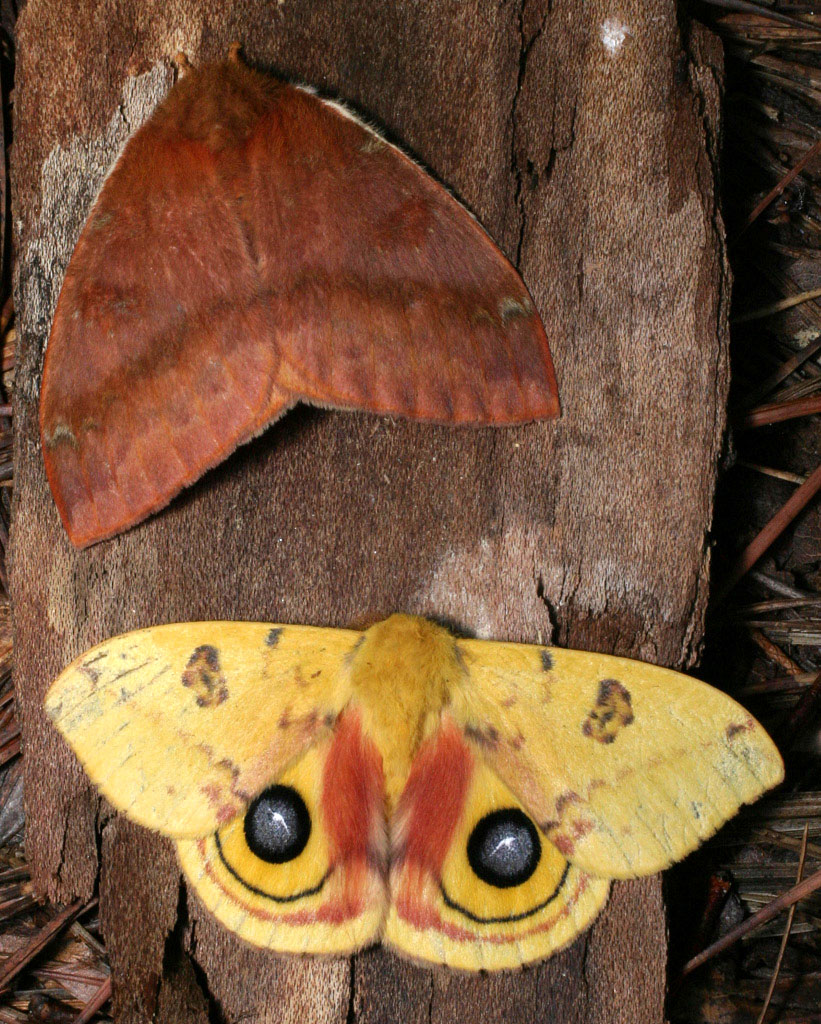
Automeris io

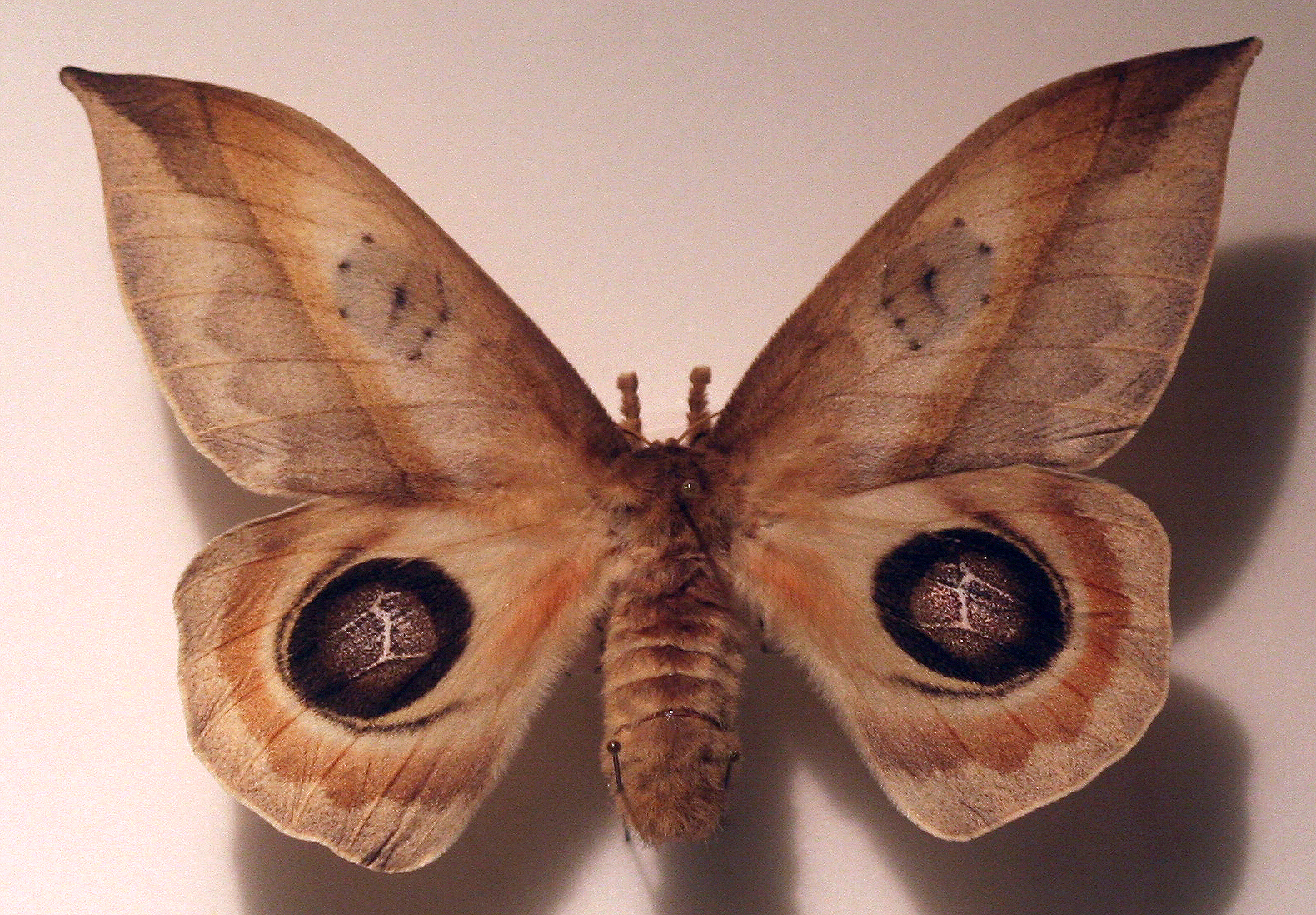
Automeris metzli

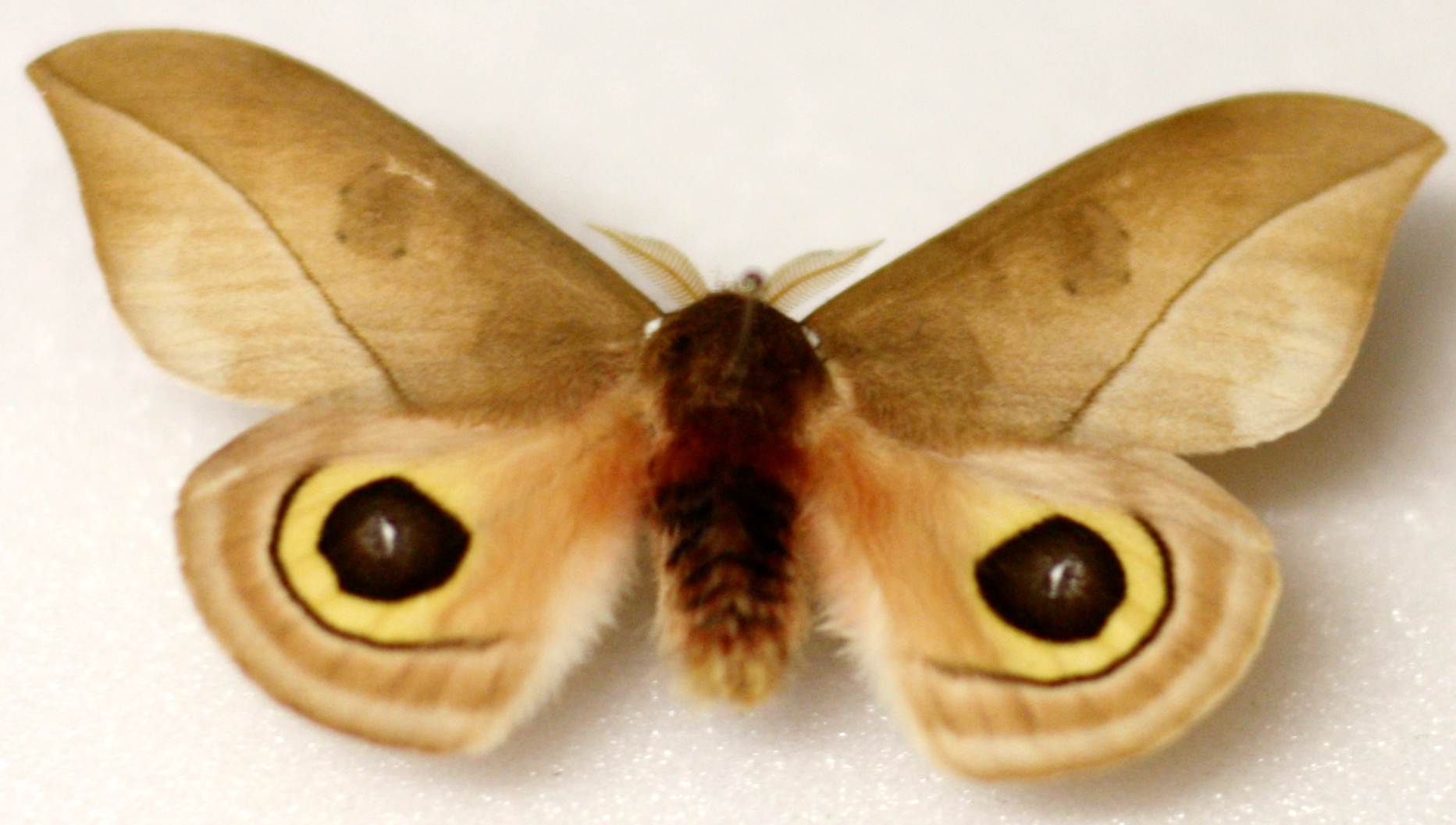
Automeris zozine

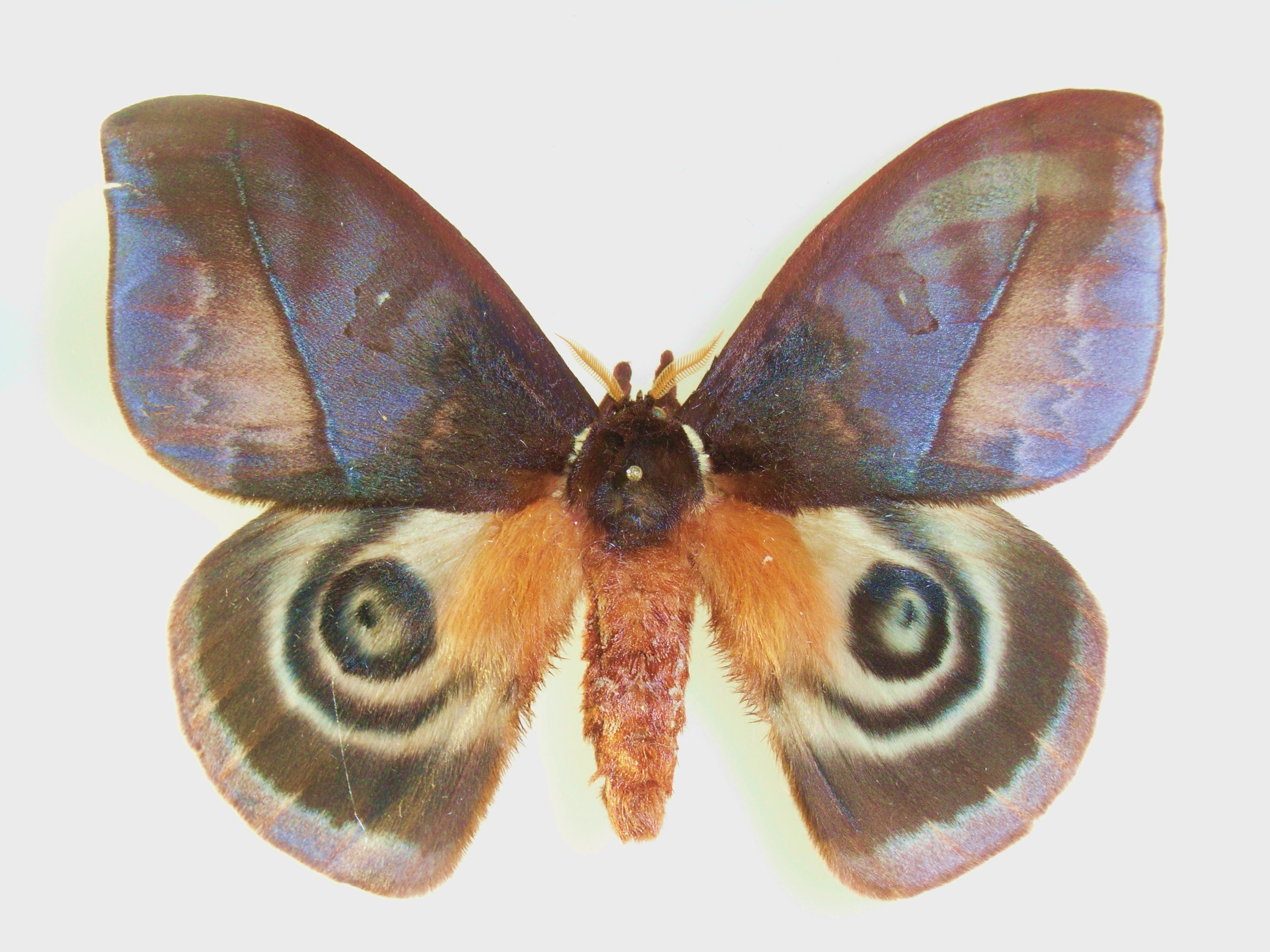
Automeris larra

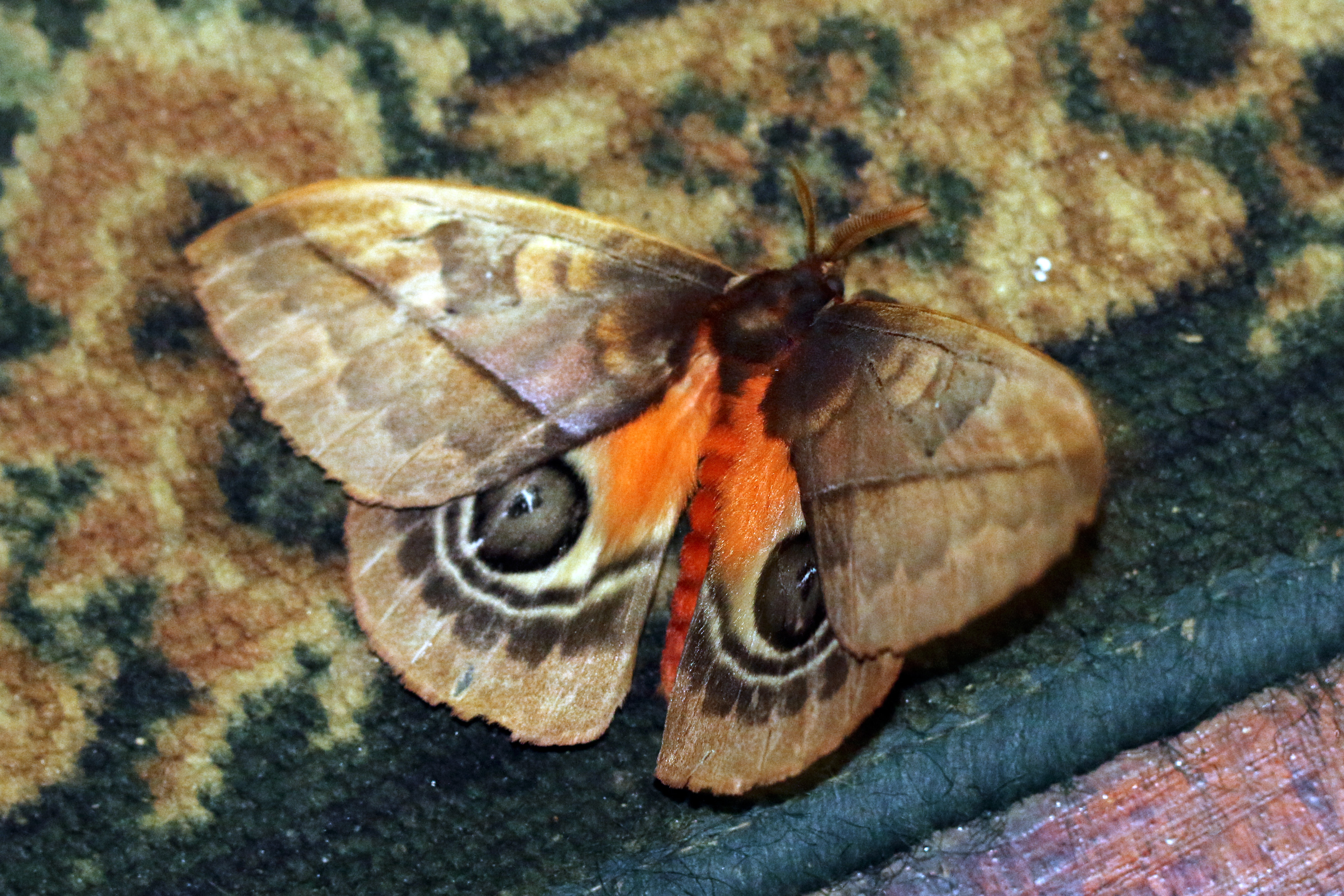
Automeris species, Trinidad
