= Automeris cecrops =

Scientific classification
- Kingdom: Animalia
- Phylum: Arthropoda
- Clade: Pancrustacea
- Class: Insecta
- Order: Lepidoptera
- Family: Saturniidae
- Genus: Automeris
- Species: A. cecrops

Binomial name
- Automeris cecrops (Boisduval, 1875)

Species of moth

Automeris cecrops, the cecrops eyed silkmoth, is a species of insect in the family Saturniidae. It is found in Central America and North America.

== Subspecies ==
These three subspecies belong to the species Automeris cecrops:

- Automeris cecrops cecrops (Boisduval, 1875)
- Automeris cecrops pamina (Neumoegen, 1882)
- Automeris cecrops peigleri Lemaire, 1981
