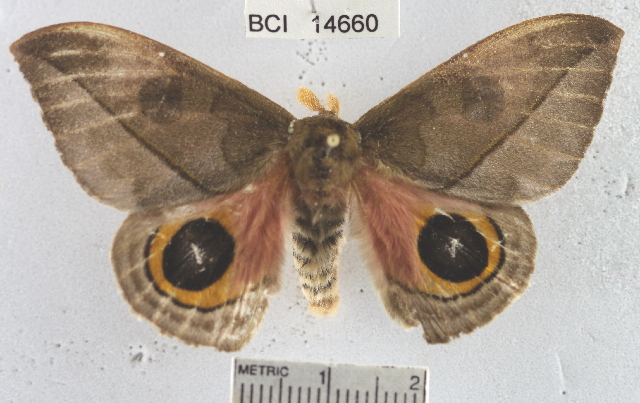

Scientific classification
- Domain: Eukaryota
- Kingdom: Animalia
- Phylum: Arthropoda
- Class: Insecta
- Order: Lepidoptera
- Family: Saturniidae
- Genus: Automeris
- Species: A. zugana

Binomial name
- Automeris zugana H. Druce, 1886

= Automeris zugana =

Species of moth

Automeris zugana is a moth of the family Saturniidae first described by Herbert Druce in 1886. It is found from Panama to western Ecuador. The habitat consists of hyperhumid tropical rain forests at altitudes between 60 and 1,400 meters.

The larvae feed on Quercus and Salix species.
