= Automeris iris =

Scientific classification
- Kingdom: Animalia
- Phylum: Arthropoda
- Clade: Pancrustacea
- Class: Insecta
- Order: Lepidoptera
- Family: Saturniidae
- Subfamily: Hemileucinae
- Genus: Automeris
- Species: A. iris

Binomial name
- Automeris iris (Walker, 1865)

Species of moth

Automeris iris, the iris eyed silkmoth, is a species of insect in the family Saturniidae. It is found in Central America and North America.

== Subspecies ==
These two subspecies belong to the species Automeris iris:

- Automeris iris hesselorum Ferguson, 1972
- Automeris iris iris (Walker, 1865)
