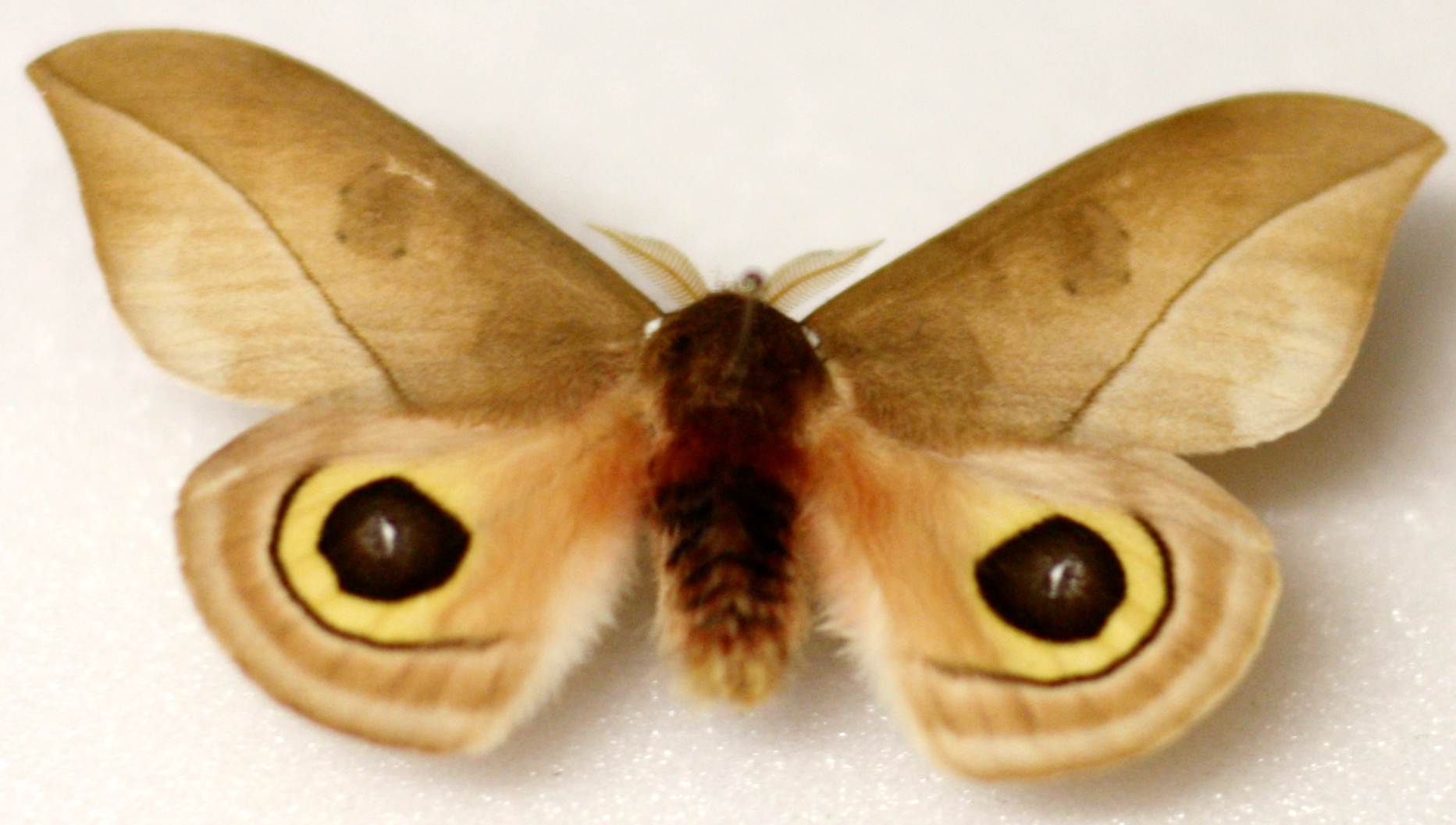

Scientific classification
- Domain: Eukaryota
- Kingdom: Animalia
- Phylum: Arthropoda
- Class: Insecta
- Order: Lepidoptera
- Family: Saturniidae
- Genus: Automeris
- Species: A. zozine

Binomial name
- Automeris zozine Druce, 1886

= Automeris zozine =

Species of moth

Automeris zozine is a moth of the family Saturniidae. It is found in Mexico, south to Guatemala and Colombia.

The wingspan is about 65 mm.

The larvae feed on Quercus and Robinia species.
