= Sardinera =

Barrio of Fajardo, Puerto Rico

- Barrio
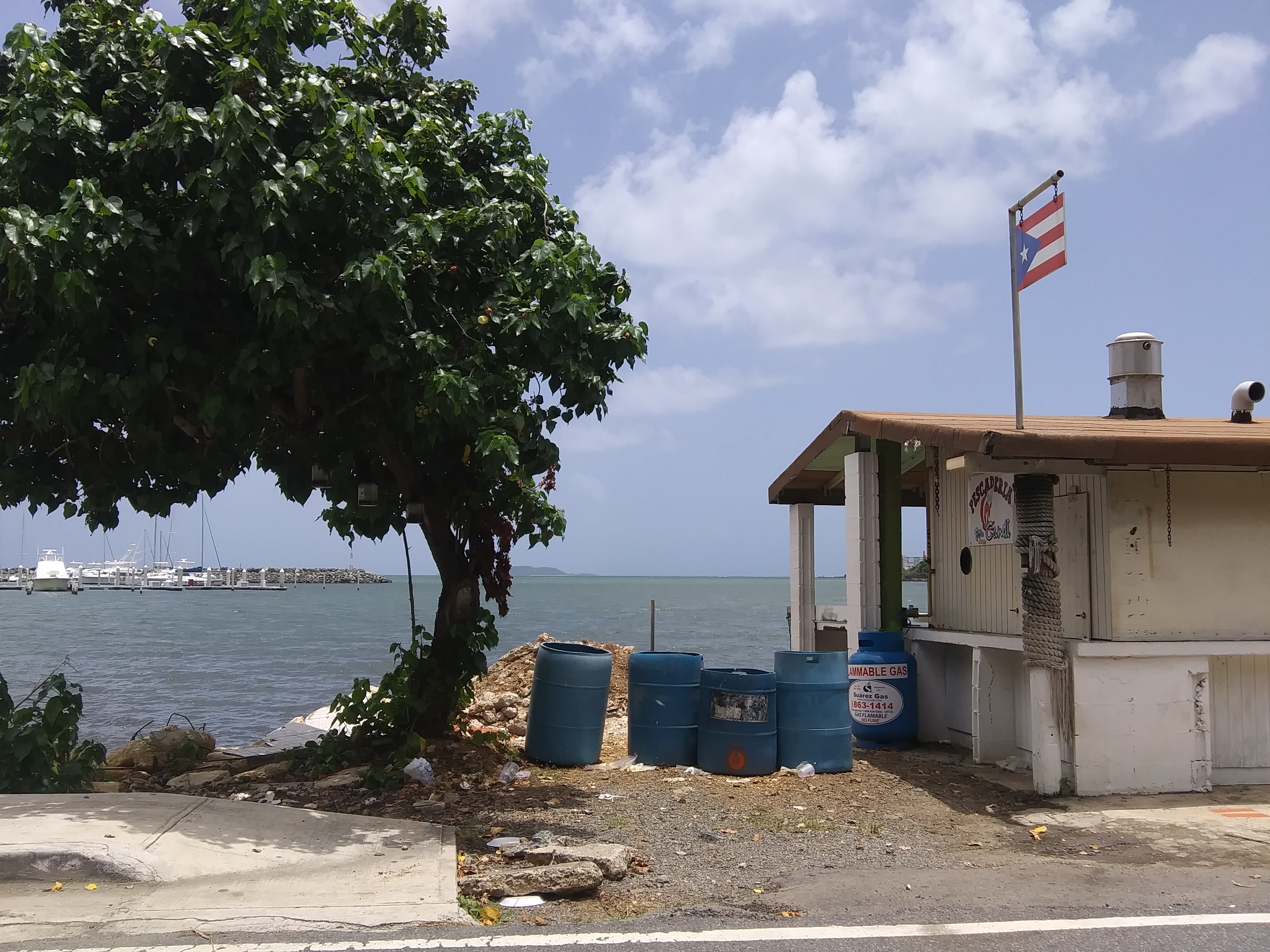
- Fish market in Sardinera

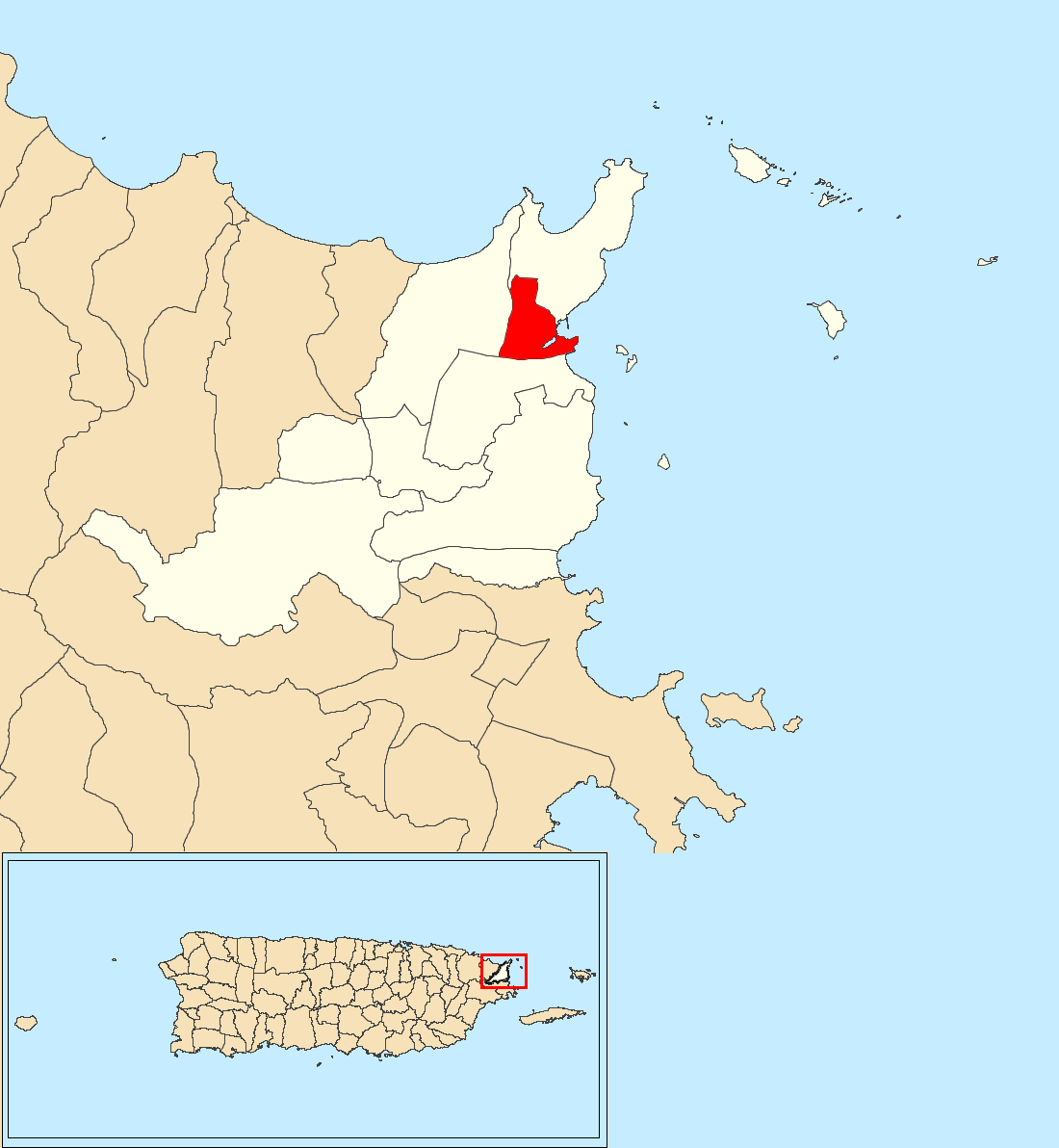
- Location of Sardinera within the municipality of Fajardo shown in red

- Location of Puerto Rico
- Coordinates: 18°20′46″N 65°38′34″W
- Commonwealth: Puerto Rico
- Municipality: Fajardo

Area
  - Total: 1.18 sq mi (3.1 km^{2})
  - Land: 0.95 sq mi (2.5 km^{2})
  - Water: 0.23 sq mi (0.60 km^{2})
- Elevation: 128 ft (39 m)

Population (2010)
  - Total: 1,190
  - Density: 1,252.6/sq mi (483.6/km^{2})
- Source: 2010 Census
- Time zone: UTC−4 (AST)
- ZIP Code: 00738

Sardinera is a barrio in the municipality of Fajardo, Puerto Rico. Its population in 2010 was 1,190.

== History ==
Sardinera was in Spain's gazetteers until Puerto Rico was ceded by Spain in the aftermath of the Spanish–American War under the terms of the Treaty of Paris of 1898 and became an unincorporated territory of the United States. In 1899, the United States Department of War conducted a census of Puerto Rico finding that the combined population of Naranjo and Sardinera barrios was 999.

Historical population
Census	Pop.	Note	%±
1910	458		—
1920	160		−65.1%
1930	290		81.3%
1940	660		127.6%
1950	268		−59.4%
1960	575		114.6%
1970	0		−100.0%
1980	741		—
1990	856		15.5%
2000	925		8.1%
2010	1,190		28.6%
U.S. Decennial Census; 1900 (N/A) 1910-1930; 1930-1950 1980-2000 2010

A shipment of cocaine with an estimated value of over US$6 million was confiscated in early 2021 at the marina in Sardinera.

During the COVID-19 pandemic, residents of Sardinera were able to participate in auto chinchorreo (curbside pickup) thus were able to pick up free meals from local food establishments. This initiative was launched by Mayor José Aníbal “Joey” Meléndez Méndez to tackle hunger.

== See also ==
- List of communities in Puerto Rico
