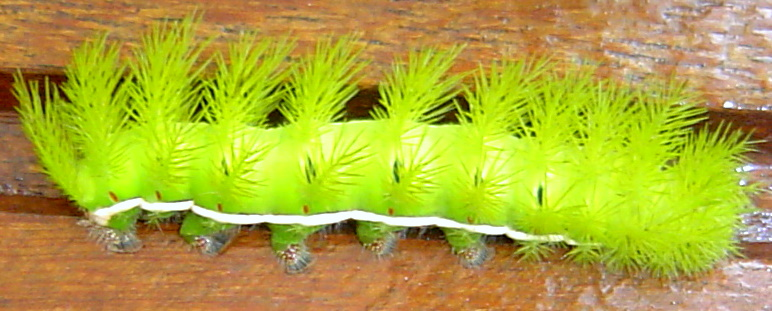

Scientific classification
- Kingdom: Animalia
- Phylum: Arthropoda
- Clade: Pancrustacea
- Class: Insecta
- Order: Lepidoptera
- Family: Saturniidae
- Genus: Automeris
- Species: A. illustris

Binomial name
- Automeris illustris (Walker, 1855)

= Automeris illustris =

Species of moth

Automeris illustris is a species of moth of the family Saturniidae first described by Francis Walker in 1855. It is found in South America, including Paraguay, Brazil and Argentina.

The larvae feed on a wide range of plants. In scientific tests over 50 plants from 28 families (including Fabaceae, Rutaceae, Meliaceae and Myrtaceae) where accepted as food.
