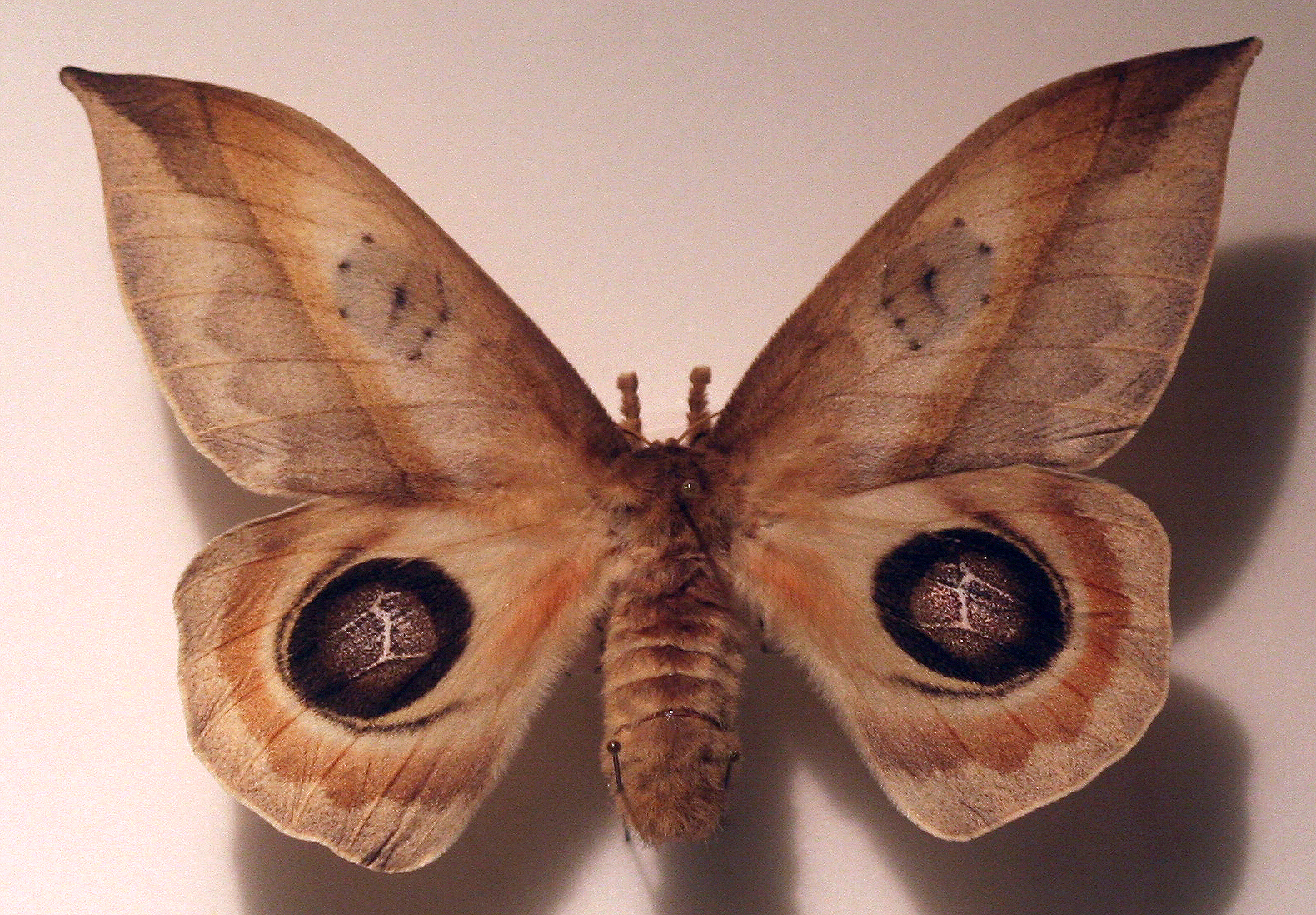

Scientific classification
- Domain: Eukaryota
- Kingdom: Animalia
- Phylum: Arthropoda
- Class: Insecta
- Order: Lepidoptera
- Family: Saturniidae
- Genus: Automeris
- Species: A. metzli

Binomial name
- Automeris metzli (Sallé, 1853)

Synonyms
- Saturnia metzli Sallé, 1853

= Automeris metzli =

Species of moth

Automeris metzli is a moth of the family Saturniidae. It is found from Mexico to Venezuela, Colombia and Ecuador and can also be found in Trinidad

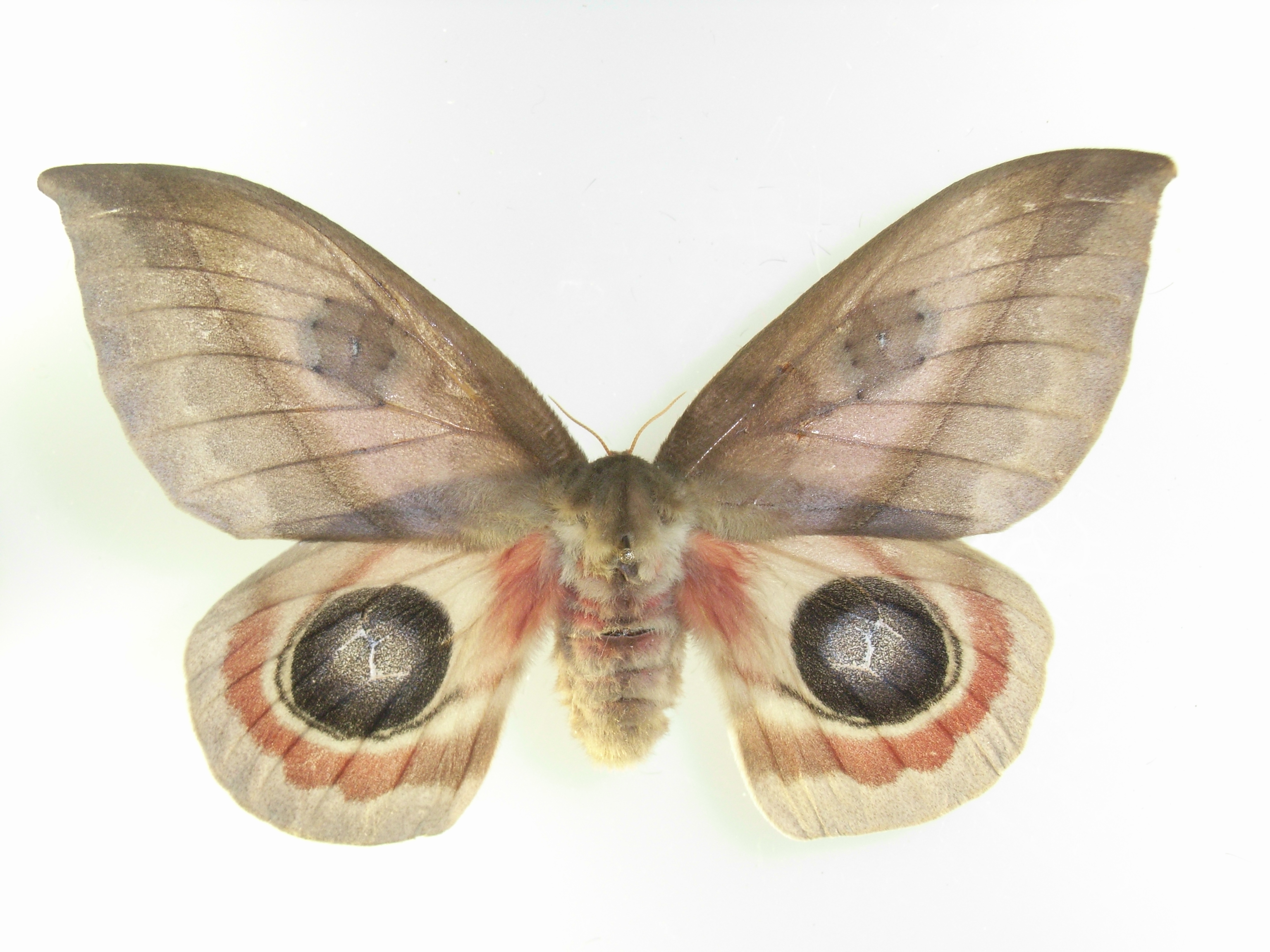

The larvae feed on Quercus species.
