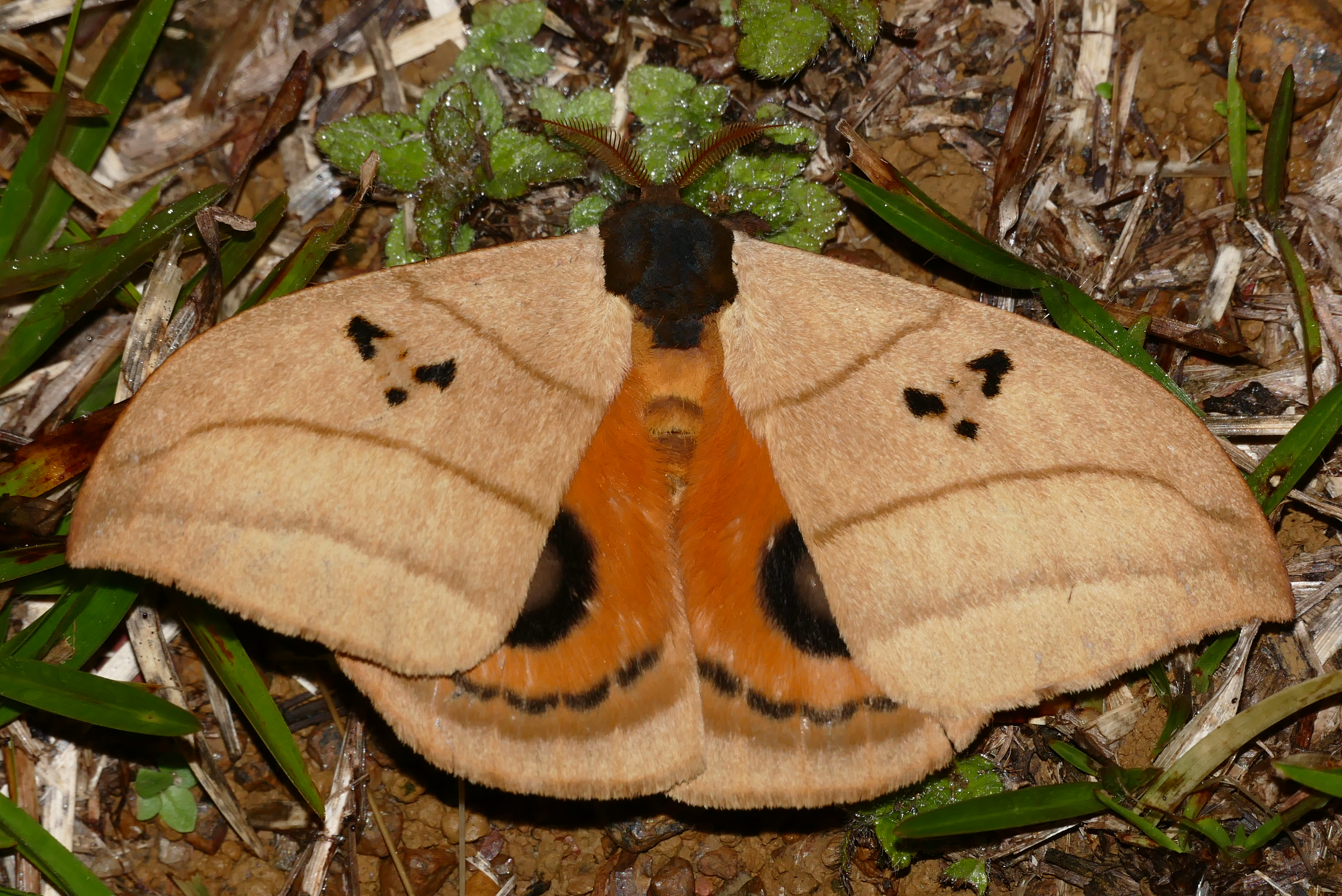

Scientific classification
- Kingdom: Animalia
- Phylum: Arthropoda
- Clade: Pancrustacea
- Class: Insecta
- Order: Lepidoptera
- Family: Saturniidae
- Genus: Automeris
- Species: A. curvilinea

Binomial name
- Automeris curvilinea Schaus, 1906

= Automeris curvilinea =

Species of moth

Automeris curvilinea is a species from the genus Automeris. The species was originally described in 1906 by William Schaus.

== Description ==
A. curvillinea is a moth with a blackish brown head and thorax The abdomen are predominantly brown with transverse black bands. Male specimens are grayish brown, while female specimens are grayer in tone. Females also have some hairs at the base.

== Range ==
This moth has been observed in South America, ranging from French Guiana in the east, through the Amazon River, towards Peru and Ecuador.
