= Naranjo, Fajardo, Puerto Rico =

Barrio of Puerto Rico

Naranjo
- Barrio
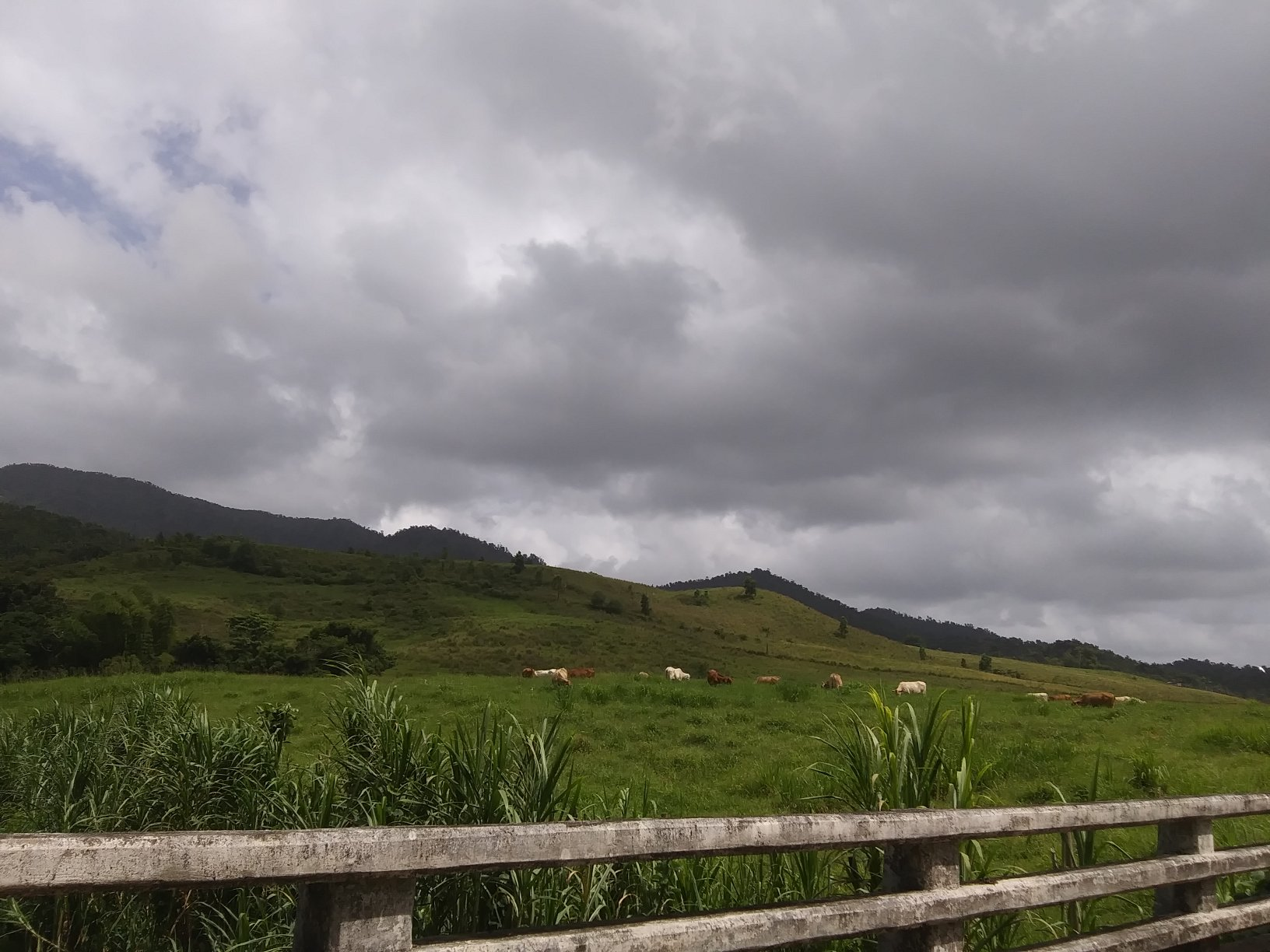
- View of El Yunque from PR-984 in Naranjo

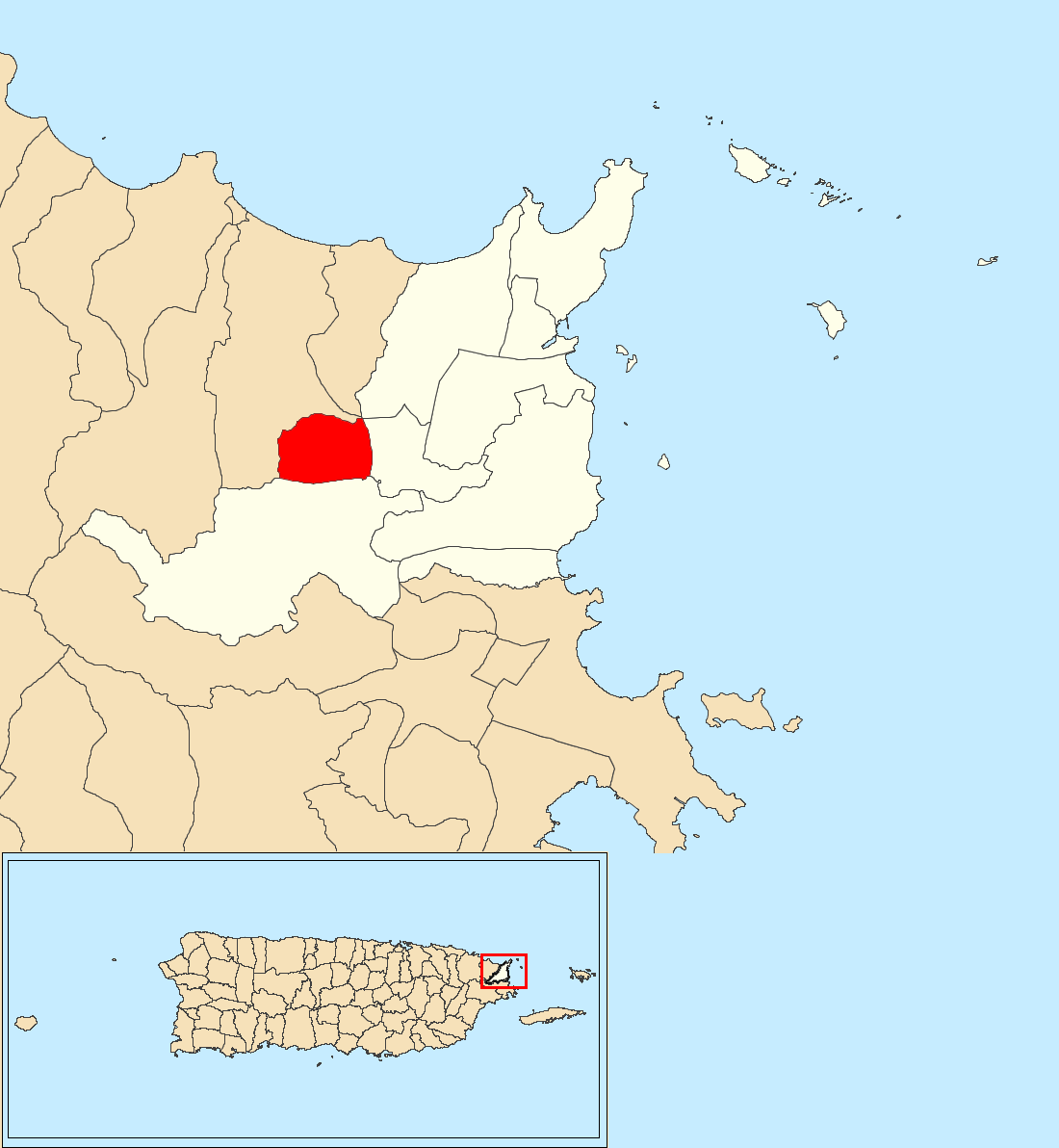
- Location of Naranjo within the municipality of Fajardo shown in red

- Location of Puerto Rico
- Coordinates: 18°18′59″N 65°41′47″W
- Commonwealth: Puerto Rico
- Municipality: Fajardo

Area
  - Total: 1.5 sq mi (3.9 km^{2})
  - Land: 1.5 sq mi (3.9 km^{2})
  - Water: 0 sq mi (0 km^{2})
- Elevation: 289 ft (88 m)

Population (2010)
  - Total: 349
  - Density: 232.7/sq mi (89.8/km^{2})
- Source: 2010 Census
- Time zone: UTC−4 (AST)
- ZIP Code: 00738

Naranjo is a barrio in the municipality of Fajardo, Puerto Rico. Its population in 2010 was 349.

== History ==
Naranjo was in Spain's gazetteers until Puerto Rico was ceded by Spain in the aftermath of the Spanish–American War under the terms of the Treaty of Paris of 1898 and became an unincorporated territory of the United States. In 1899, the United States Department of War conducted a census of Puerto Rico finding that the combined population of Naranjo and Sardinera barrios was 999.

Historical population
Census	Pop.	Note	%±
1910	506		—
1920	503		−0.6%
1930	510		1.4%
1940	458		−10.2%
1950	334		−27.1%
1960	180		−46.1%
1970	376		108.9%
1980	136		−63.8%
1990	67		−50.7%
2000	218		225.4%
2010	349		60.1%
U.S. Decennial Census; 1900 (N/A) 1910-1930; 1930-1950 1980-2000 2010

== Gallery ==
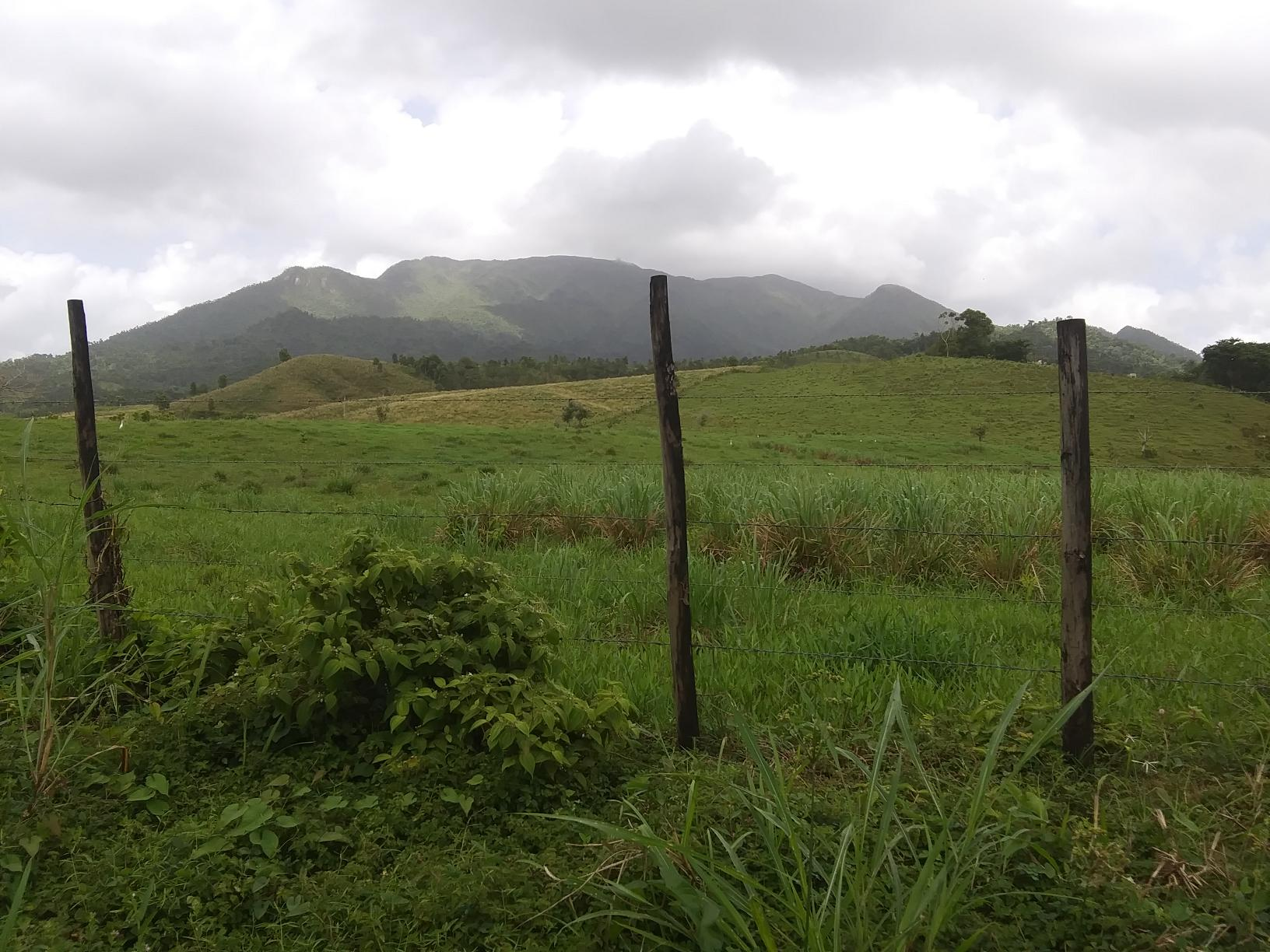
View of El Yunque from PR-984 in Naranjo

== See also ==
- List of communities in Puerto Rico
