= Los Naranjos =

Los Naranjos may refer to:

- Los Naranjos, Honduras
- Los Naranjos, Chiriquí, Panama
