= El Naranjo, Salta =

Coordinates: 25°44′S 64°59′W

El Naranjo (Salta)
- Municipality and village
- Interactive map of El Naranjo (Salta)
- Country: Argentina
- Province: Salta Province
- Time zone: UTC−3 (ART)

El Naranjo (Salta) is a village and rural municipality in Salta Province in northwestern Argentina.
