= Automeris zephyria =

Scientific classification
- Kingdom: Animalia
- Phylum: Arthropoda
- Class: Insecta
- Order: Lepidoptera
- Family: Saturniidae
- Genus: Automeris
- Species: A. zephyria

Binomial name
- Automeris zephyria Grote, 1882

Species of moth

Automeris zephyria, the zephyr eyed silkmoth, is a species of insect in the family Saturniidae. It is found in North America.

The MONA or Hodges number for Automeris zephyria is 7749.

== Subspecies ==
These two subspecies belong to the species Automeris zephyria:

- Automeris zephyria zephyria
- Automeris zephyria zephyriata Barnes & Benjamin
