= Juan de los Angeles Naranjo =

Argentine painter and draughtsman

Juan de los Ángeles Naranjo
- Born: Juan de los Angeles Naranjo; 2 October 1897; Rosario, Santa Fe, Argentina
- Died: 6 February 1952 (aged 54); Río Ceballos, Córdoba, Argentina
- Resting place: Panteón de los Profesores nacionales del Cementerio El Salvador. Rosario, Argentina.
- Education: Emilio Blanqué, Real Academia de San Fernando, Madrid, Antonio Mancini
- Known for: Painting, drawing, teaching
- Notable work: "El Filósofo" Leon Tolstoi, Portrait of Gerardo Machado, Portrait of Carlos Manuel de Céspedes, Portrait of Hipólito Yrigoyen.
- Movement: Spanish School / Escuela Española
- Patrons: The Huntington Library; Metropolitan Museum of Art; Metropolitan Opera House.

Juan de los Ángeles Naranjo (2 October 1897 – 6 February 1952) was an Argentine painter, and draughtsman. He is best known for his portrait of renowned artist and politicians of his time such as Hipólito Yrigoyen, Carlos Manuel de Céspedes, Gerardo Machado, Bartolomé Mitre, María Barrientos, Enrico Caruso and Gabriela Besanzoni. He was born in Rosario, Santa Fe, on October 2, 1897.

== Early years ==
In 1913, after studding next to maestro Emilio Blaqué, Naranjo traveled to Spain to assist for the following to years of study at the Real Academia de Bellas Artes de San Fernando from which also Pablo Picasso and Salvador Dalí graduated in the coming years. During this period in Madrid, the artist gained the benefits of a grant instituted by the Count Eusebi Güell of Barcelona. The grant permitted Naranjo to travel to Italy where in 1917 and 1918 he assisted as student to the studio of maestro Antonio Mancini in what was known as "La Hebrea" workshops. During those workshops Naranjo won the recognition of his teacher and fellow students and a second place with "El filósofo" (Oil on Canvas) depicting the head of count Leon Tolstoy.

In 1919 the Huntington Library of California, U.S., hired Naranjo as a restorer in charge of newly acquired European art. A year later, Naranjo won the open call to artists for the painting of a portrait of Cuban national hero Carlos Manuel de Céspedes. During his visit to Cuba, Naranjo was commissioned to paint the likeness of Gerardo Machado. Between 1921 and 1930, Naranjo worked as a restorer at the New York Metropolitan Museum of Art. During this period Naranjo was commissioned by the Argentine newspaper La Nación to conceive a portrait of its founder: Bartolomé Mitre. The RCA Victor also requested the expertise and talents of Naranjo to come up with portraits for the prestigious recording studios. The series, which included the likeness of Enrico Caruso, María Barrientos, and Riccardo Stracciari, are today property of the Metropolitan Opera House. During his prolonged stay in New York, Narajo taught art at the Sieger Institute in Cooper Union. Before leaving New York for South America, Naranjo applied and thus won an open competition at the Madison Square Garden, the awarded was to receive US $1,000 in exchange for a portrait of heavyweight-boxing champion Luis Ángel Firpo. On his way back to Argentina, Naranjo traveled extensively through the South American nations on the Pacific where he exhibited his works.

== Final years ==
Naranjo arrives in Buenos Aires sometime in 1930 before the military coup that deposed Hipólito Yrigoyen. Before stepping down from the executive office, president Yrigoyen posed for Naranjo. During the following years in Argentina, Naranjo was commissioned to depict influential personalities such as Bishop Antonio Caggiano (1934), and prominent members of the community such as Mrs. Elivira Bradley de Montes (1945). In 1932 Naranjo exhibits his work at the Teatro Municipal de Rio de Janeiro, Brazil; and a major retrospective of Naranjo's works was held at the Museo de Bellas Artes de Rosario shortly after his return to Argentina. In 1935 Naranjo traveled to Patagonia to explore and paint the landscapes of the Andes, forests and deserts of the south.

Juan de los Angeles Naranjo was professor at the Profesorado Nacional de Estética under the umbrella of the Escuela Normal Nacional "Juan María Gutierrez", and also at the Escuela de Artes Plásticas de Rosario. He died in Rosario in 1952. Naranjo died on February 6, 1952, in Rio Ceballos, Córdoba, Argentina. He was survived by his wife Juana Costanza Moncotte; his daughters Beatriz Aida and Grisela; and his son Ruben, also a renowned local visual artist.
