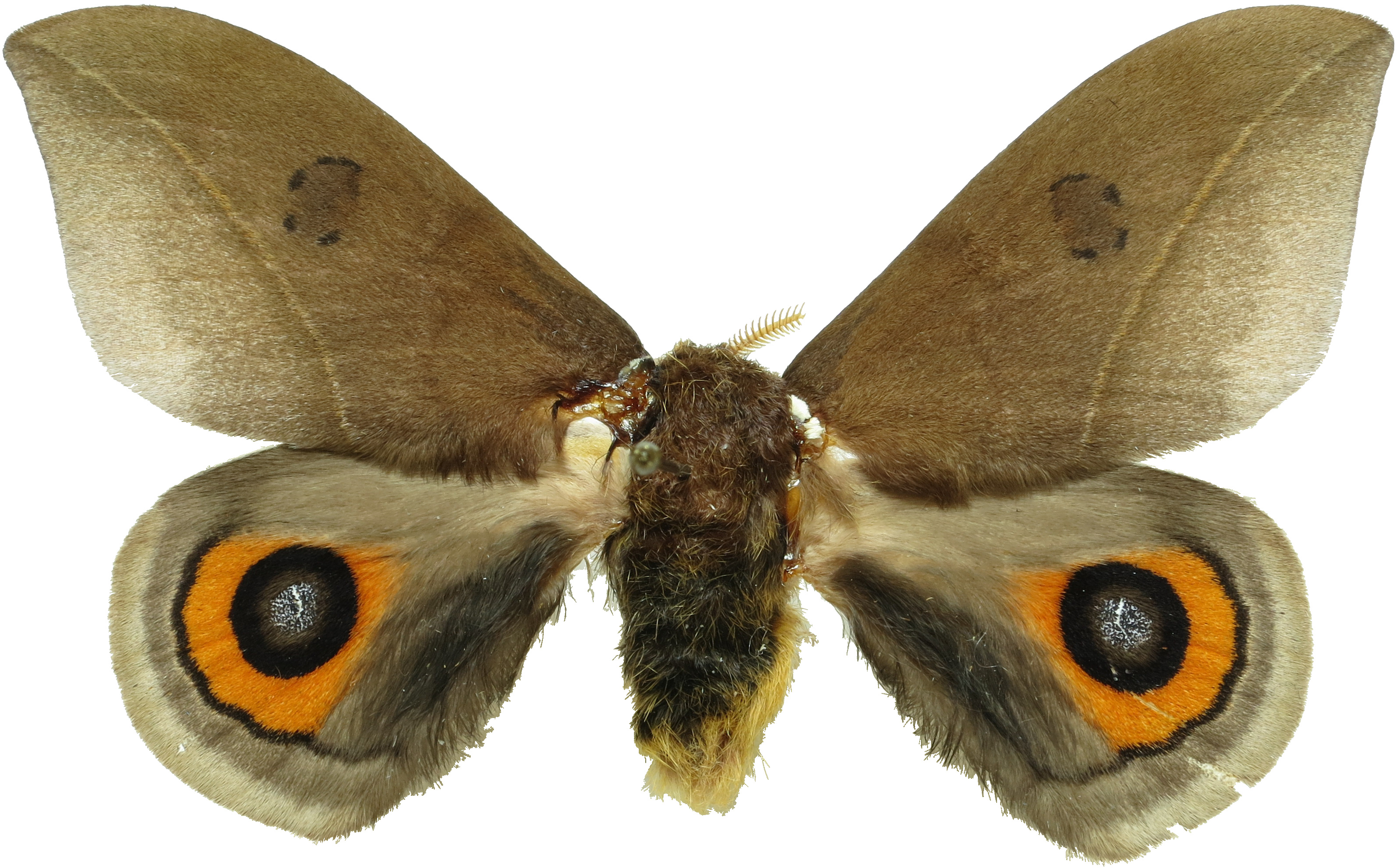
- Automeris naranja male
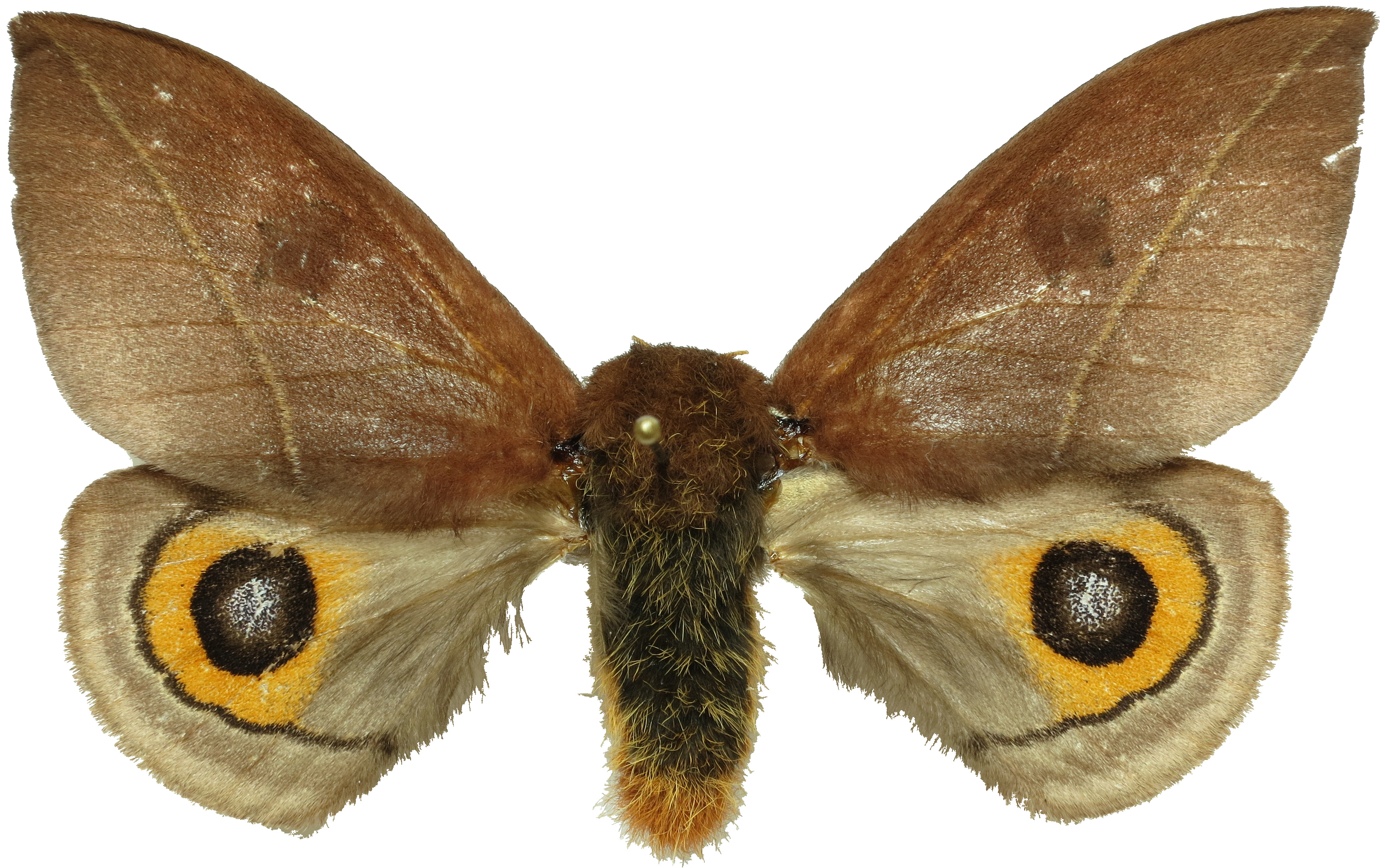
- Automeris naranja female

Scientific classification
- Domain: Eukaryota
- Kingdom: Animalia
- Phylum: Arthropoda
- Class: Insecta
- Order: Lepidoptera
- Family: Saturniidae
- Genus: Automeris
- Species: A. naranja

Binomial name
- Automeris naranja Schaus, 1898

= Automeris naranja =

Species of moth

Automeris naranja is a species of moth of the family Saturniidae. It is found in Bolivia, Brazil, Paraguay, Uruguay and Argentina. This species is easy to raise in captivity.

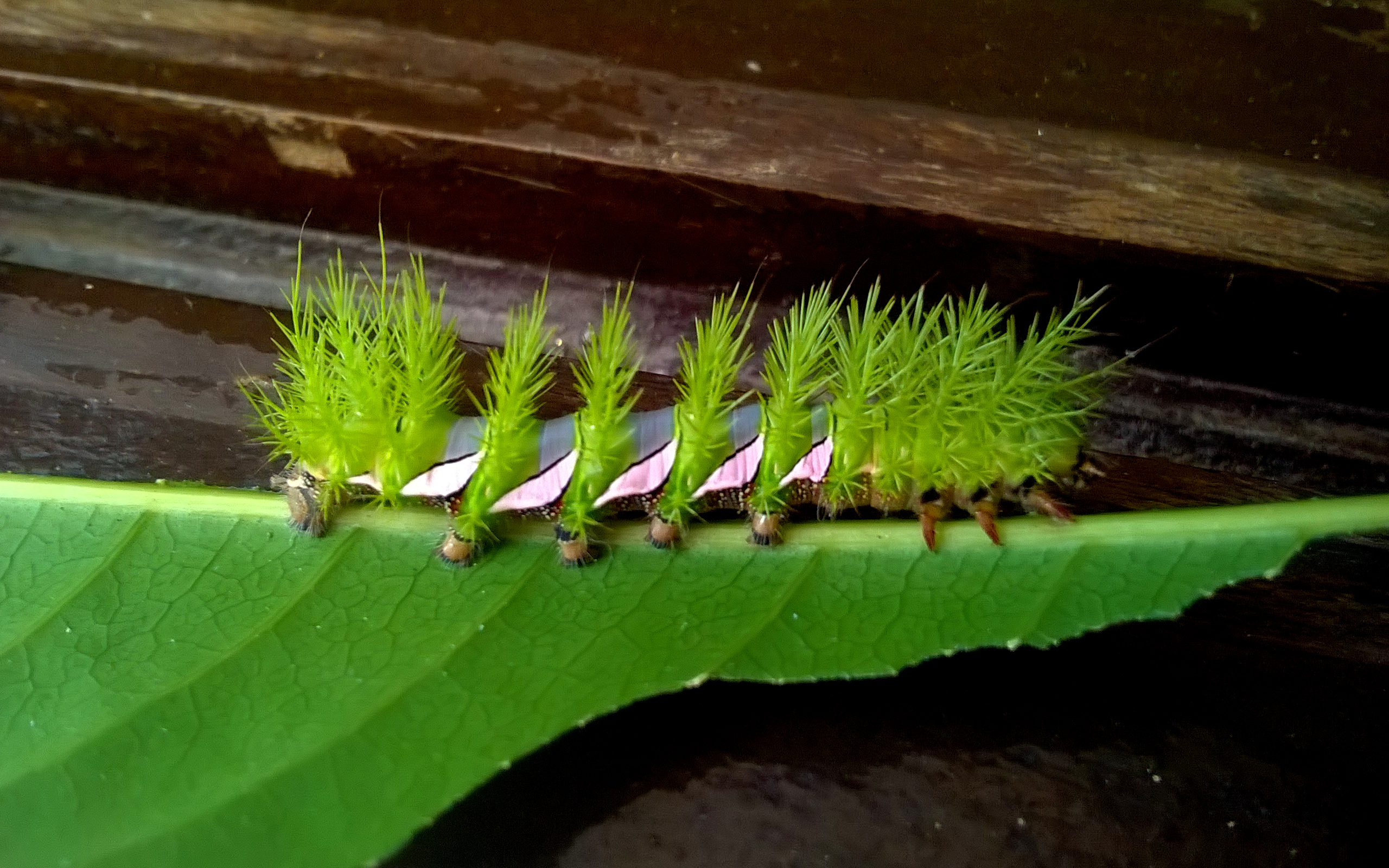
Automeris naranja caterpillar

The larvae feed on Morus alba, Morus nigra and Fraxinus americana.
