= Orlando Antonio Naranjo =

- Born: Orlando Antonio Naranjo Villarroel; 13 June 1951 (age 75); Anaco, Anzoátegui state, Venezuela
- Education: University of the Andes
- Occupations: University professor, researcher
- Employer: University of the Andes

Orlando Antonio Naranjo Villarroel (13 June 1951) is a Venezuelan astronomer and professor at the Faculty of Sciences of the University of Los Andes. Born in Anaco, Anzoátegui state, he is renowned for being the co-discoverer of Comet Shoemaker–Levy 9 and an active researcher of minor planets.
