= La Gente Naranja =

Ecuadorian rock band based in Miami, USA

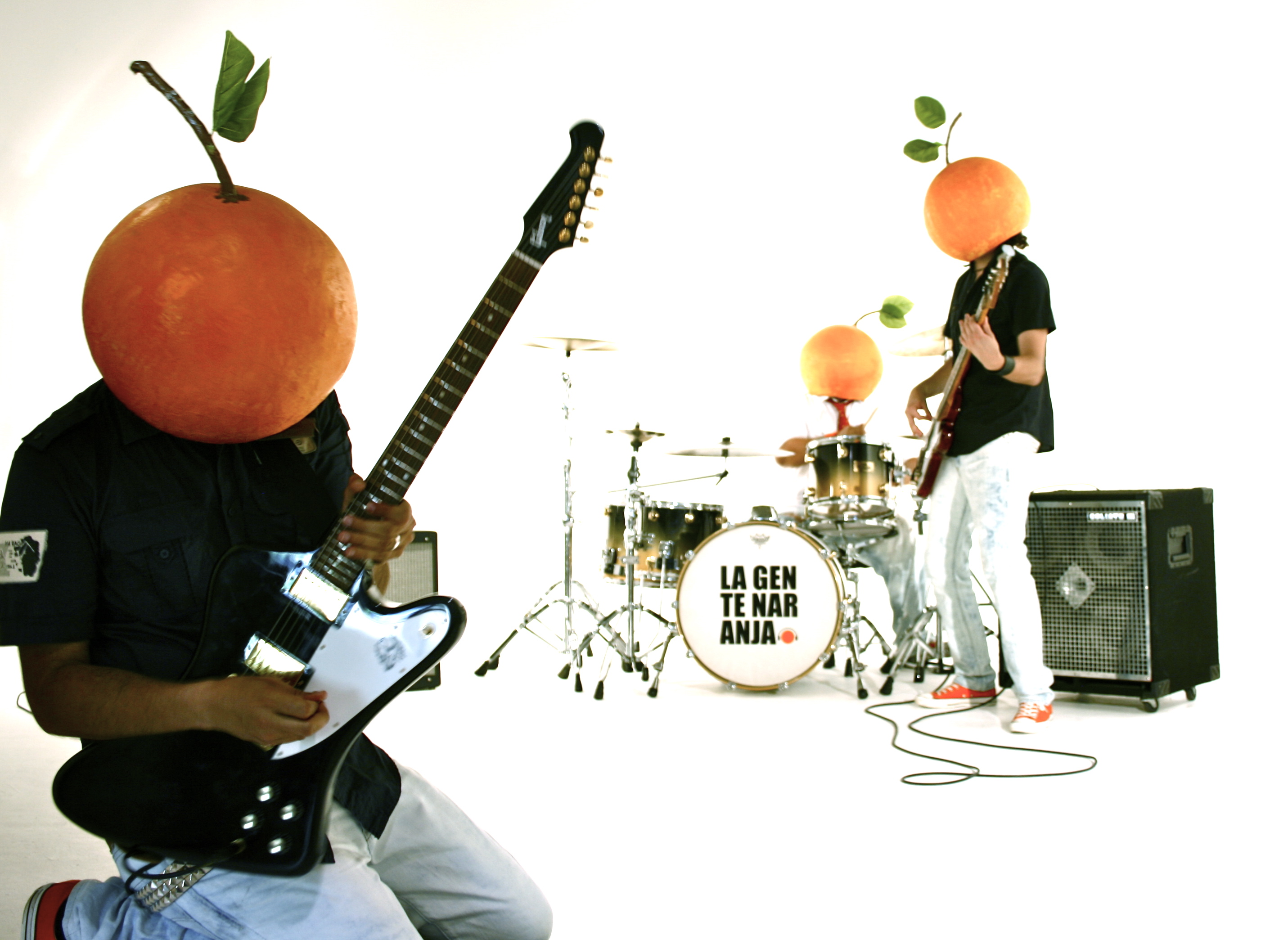

Background information
- Also known as: LGN
- Origin: Miami, Florida
- Genres: Rock; Pop
- Years active: 2009 – present
- Labels: Nexstar Enterprises
- Members: left to right: Eddie Garcia; Jose Nouel; Diego Saa
- Website: LaGenteNaranja.com

La Gente Naranja (The Orange People) is an Ecuadorian rock en español band based in Miami, Florida. La Gente Naranja started in 2009 with band members Eddie Garcia (vocals and guitar), Jose Nouel (drums) and Diego Saa (vocals and bass guitar). The group made its first breakthrough in 2010 with the release of the music video for their first single "Luz al Sur", and their debut album of the same name.

== Discography and highlights ==
=== Albums ===
Luz al Sur

- Released: 2010
- Label: Nextstar
- Song List
1. Misil
2. Rosa En Mi Jardin
3. Luz al Sur
4. Elevador
5. Vision Platonica
6. Un Dia Mas Sin Ti
7. Lo Inexplicable
8. Diamante
9. Botellas Vacias
10. Ghetto Booty
- Official Singles:
  - "Luz al Sur" (Light from the South)

=== Videos ===
- Luz al Sur (Southern Light 2010)
