= Vino de naranja =

Spanish white wine

Vino de naranja or 'orange wine' is produced in Huelva and Málaga in Andalucia, Spain with white wine macerated with orange peel. Vino Naranja del Condado de Huelva is an appellation of origin for aromatised sweet wines originating in Condado de Huelva, Spain. The system of production and aging of this wine is a white wine flavoured with macerated orange peel followed by a process of aging by the solera system. Orange Wine from Huelva is usually dark orange to brown in color. The brown color is a result of sun drying of the grapes prior to fermentation.

Moscatel Naranja or Orange Moscatel is a sweet wine produced in Málaga. Bitter Seville orange peels, once dried, are macerated in alcohol distilled from wine and this is added to sweet moscatel wine. Orange Wine from Málaga is almost clear in appearance.

Note that Vino de naranja is not identical to 'vino naranja', which is the Spanish for the other type of Orange_wine, which is "a type of wine made from white wine grapes where the grape skins are not removed but stay in contact with the juice for days or even months, as is more typical with red wines".
