= Las Cabezas de San Juan (Puerto Rico) =

Nature reserve in Puerto Rico

Cabezas de San Juan Nature Reserve
- Reserva Natural de las Cabezas de San Juan
- IUCN category V (protected landscape/seascape)
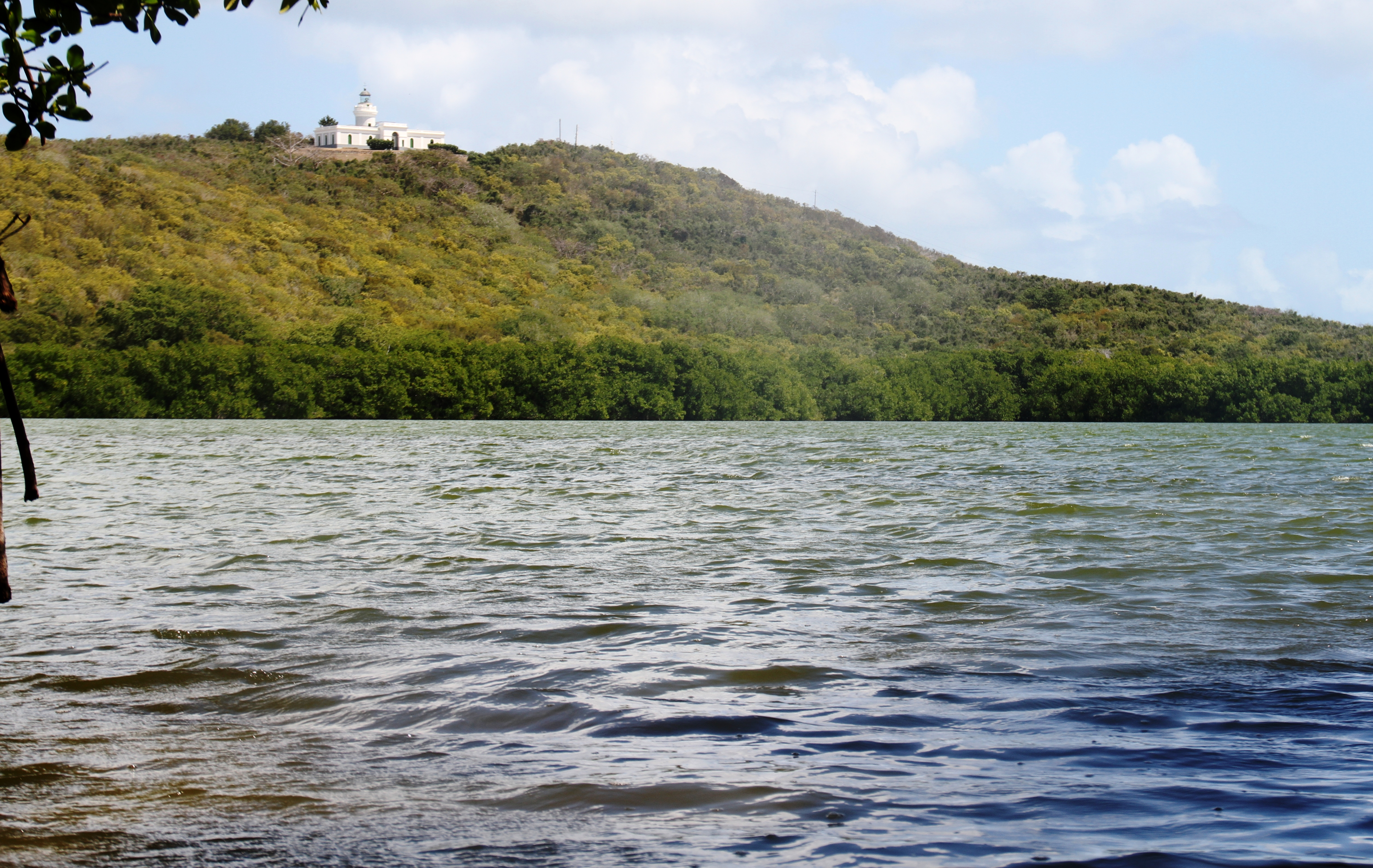
- View of the historic lighthouse from Laguna Grande

- Location within Puerto Rico
- Location: CabezasParguera, Fajardo, Puerto Rico
- Nearest city: Fajardo, Puerto Rico
- Coordinates: 18.38°N 65.62°W
- Area: 448 cda (435 acres)
- Established: 1986
- Governing body: Puerto Rico Department of Natural and Environmental Resources (DRNA), Conservation Trust of Puerto Rico

Las Cabezas de San Juan (Spanish for 'the San Juan capes' or 'headlands'), officially Cabo San Juan (Cape San Juan in English), is a coastal area and nature reserve located in the northeastern corner of the main island of Puerto Rico, particularly in the Cabezas barrio of the municipality of Fajardo. The reserve is famous for its biodiversity, with its bioluminescent lagoon (Laguna Grande, one of the three year-round bioluminescent bodies of water in the territory and one of seven in the Caribbean), its coral reefs, and its subtropical dry and mangrove forests, and for its history, particularly for its lighthouse and its role during the Puerto Rico campaign of the Spanish–American War.

== Geography ==
Cabezas de San Juan Nature Reserve consists mainly of a large peninsula located in the north-eastern corner of Puerto Rico and its surrounding bodies of water. The reserve is connected to the west to Seven Seas State Park (Parque Nacional Seven Seas) and the Northeast Ecological Corridor, and by sea in the east to La Cordillera Reef Nature Reserve, a large protected marine area consisting of a small chain of cays, reefs, and islets, collectively known as La Cordillera (''the mountain range'') or Cayos de la Cordillera (Cordillera Cays). To the north it is bound by the Atlantic Ocean and in the south it borders the fishing community of Las Croabas.

=== Toponymy ===
Las Cabezas de San Juan obtains its name from the rocky headlands found at the northernmost point of a peninsula located in the northwestern-most point of the main island of Puerto Rico, which formerly known as San Juan Bautista until early in the 18th century. While the name for the island (San Juan Bautista) and its capital city (Ciudad de Puerto Rico) were officially exchanged by 1746, the name "Cabezas de San Juan" rather than "Cabezas de Puerto Rico" kept being used to the describe this extremity of the island despite the change of name of the island colloquially and in official documents.

== Ecology ==
=== Bioluminescence ===
Laguna Grande (Spanish for 'big lagoon'), located within the nature reserve, is one of the three bodies of water in Puerto Rico with year-round bioluminescence, and one of seven in the Caribbean. The other two bioluminescent bodies of water in Puerto Rico are Puerto Mosquito in Vieques and Bahía Fosforescente at La Parguera Nature Reserve in Lajas.

== History ==
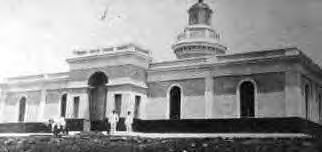
The lighthouse in 1898.

The area of Las Cabezas de San Juan was inhabited by the indigenous Taino people at the time of the Spanish arrival to the Americas in 1492. Archaeological findings in the area suggest it was a prominent entry point into the island for Pre-Columbian trade. Although the town of Fajardo was founded in 1760 close to the south around the river of the same name, the area of the peninsula was not settled at the time. Throughout the 18th century these headlands were a hotspot for smuggling, which later prompted the establishment of a port to regulate trade and commerce in the area in 1820. A lighthouse was built in the summit of the highest point of Cabezas de San Juan in 1880, and inaugurated on May 2, 1882. The peninsula and the lighthouse itself played a role later at the Battle of Fajardo in the Puerto Rico campaign of the Spanish–American War when Spanish troops under the command of Captain Pedro del Pino successfully repelled a US landing under the command of Rear Admiral Frederick Rodgers in August of 1898, who only managed to capture the lighthouse.

The peninsula itself became a wildlife refuge in 1975 when it was acquired by the Conservation Trust of Puerto Rico, it was later proclaimed a nature reserve in 1986. Hurricane Hugo made landfall in the cape and crossed the reserve as a strong Category 3 storm on September 18, 1989, after having devastated the island of Vieques earlier that same day.

== Recreation ==
Cabezas de San Juan Nature Reserve today is owned and managed by the Conservation Trust of Puerto Rico, and it is open to the public. The lighthouse operates now as a museum, also managed by the Conservation Trust of Puerto Rico.

== See also ==
- Protected areas of Puerto Rico
