= Palominos Island =

Small island located to the east of Puerto Rico

Native name: Isla de Palominos Nickname: Palomino
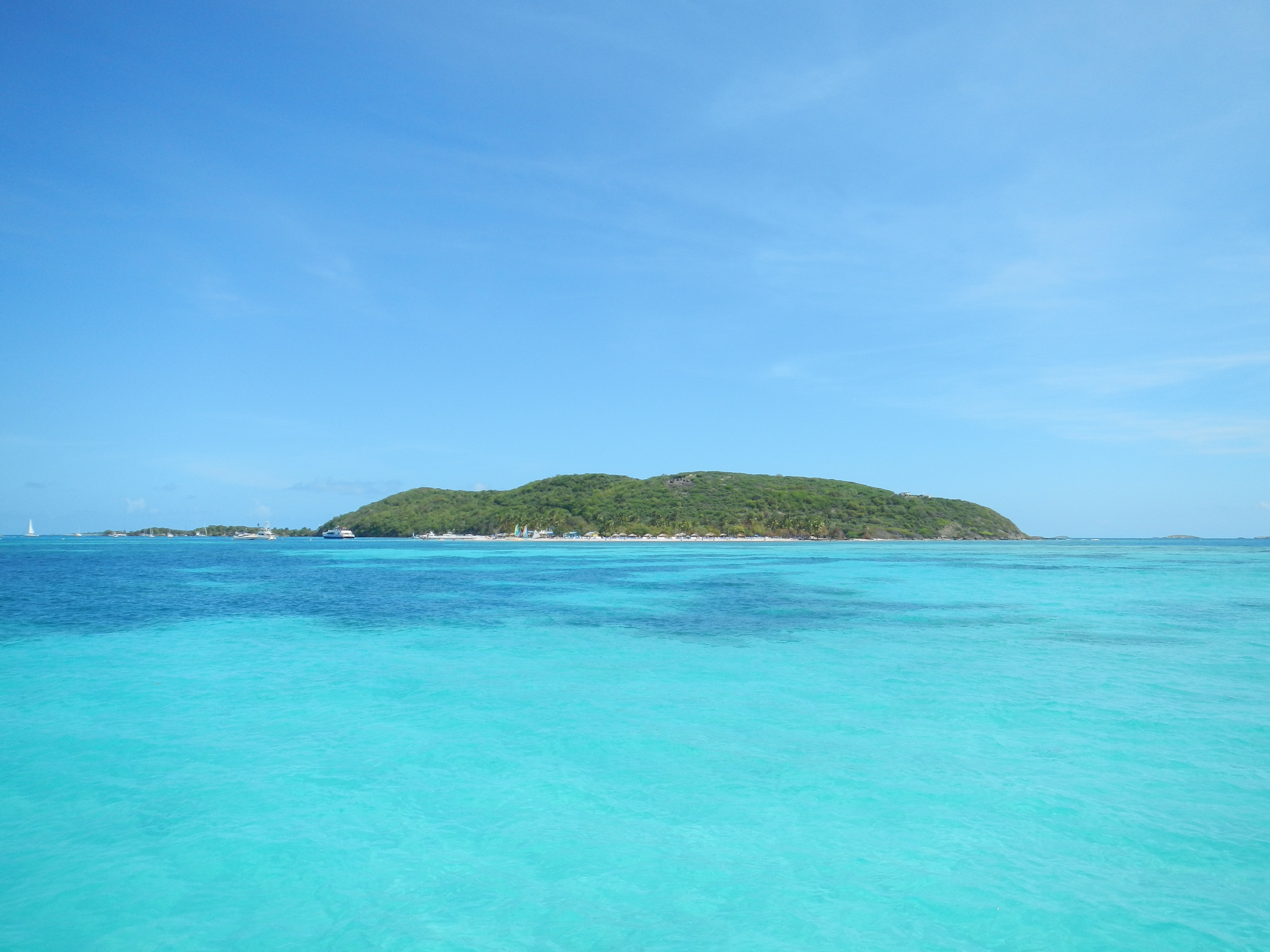
- Palominos Island from Fajardo Roads in northeastern Puerto Rico, 2012

- Location within Puerto Rico Location within Lesser Antilles Location within the Caribbean
- Interactive map

Geography
- Location: Caribbean Sea
- Coordinates: 18°20′55″N 65°34′05″W
- Archipelago: Puerto Rico Archipelago
- Area: 0.41 km^{2} (0.16 sq mi)
- Highest elevation: 50 m (160 ft)

Administration
- United States; Puerto Rico
- Territory: Puerto Rico
- Municipality: Fajardo

Palominos Island (Spanish: Isla de Palominos), most commonly known as Palomino, is a small island located off the coast of the barrio of Cabezas in the municipality of Fajardo in the northeast of the main island of Puerto Rico. Along with Icacos Cay, it forms part of a small chain of cays, reefs, and skerries protected by the La Cordillera Reef Nature Reserve. The island is home to El Conquistador Resort hotel.

== Geography ==
Palominos is 0.7 mi (1.1 km) long and maximally 1,722 feet (525 m) wide, measures 102 acres (41 ha) in area and reaches a height of 165 feet (50 m). Coral reefs, seagrass beds, and rocky coast species are among the natural attractions found in Palominos. Another attraction is the neighboring island of Palominitos, which means tiny Palominos. Located about 2,000 feet (610 meters) south of Palominos, Palominitos now almost sank due to erosion.

== Economy ==
Palominos is the largest of three private islands near Puerto Rico, the other two being the neighboring Ramos island and Lobos cay. The island is owned by the descendants of Alberto Bachman Glauser, the Bachman Family and the Fuertes Bachman Family. Most of the island is rented to El Conquistador Resort for their beach and water activities. A private company provides private yacht charters to the island. A ferry is used to get guests to the island, which takes approximately 12 minutes. Palominos horses can be rented by guests for horse-back riding on the beach.

== Gallery ==
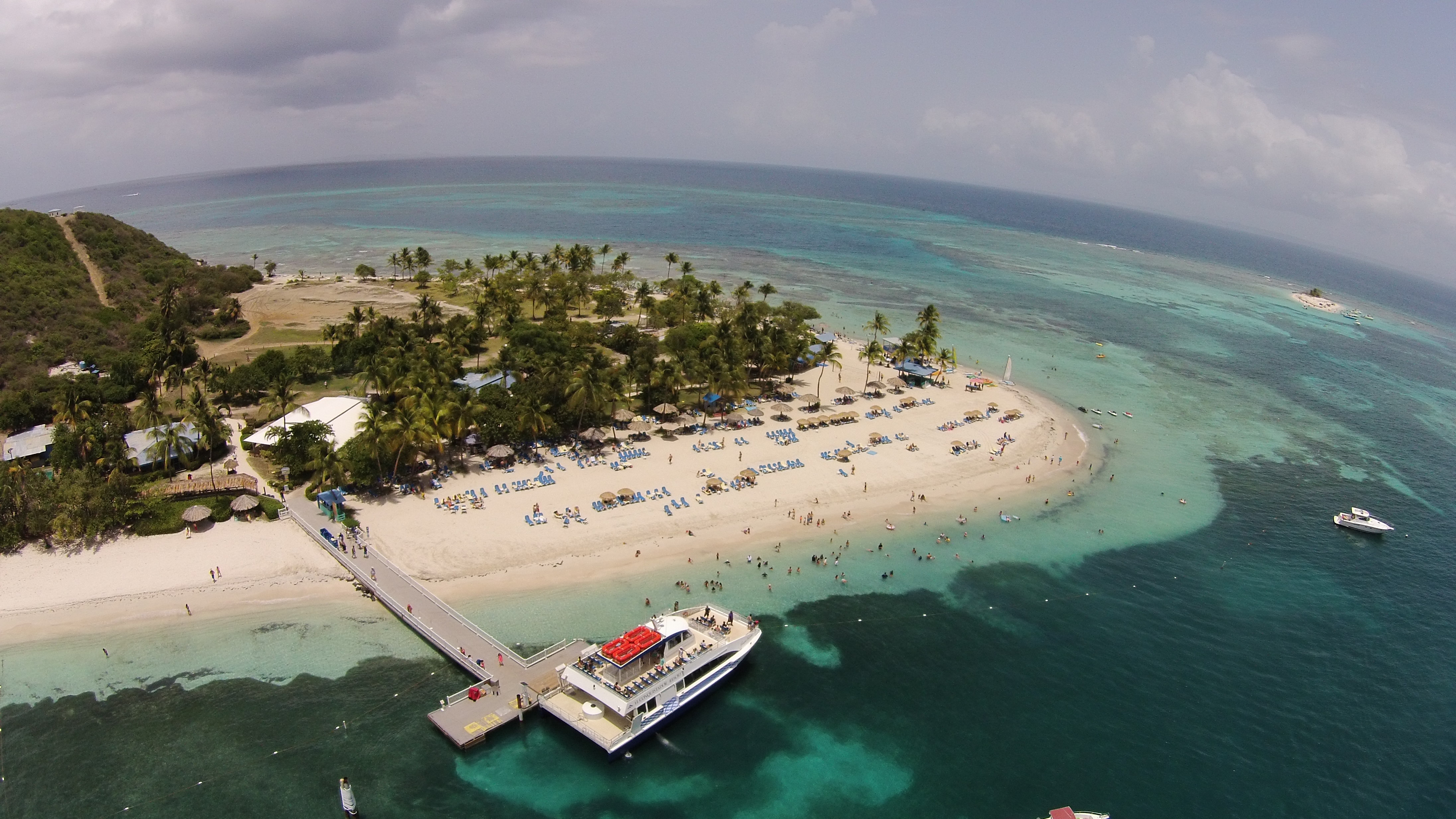
Aerial view of Palominos

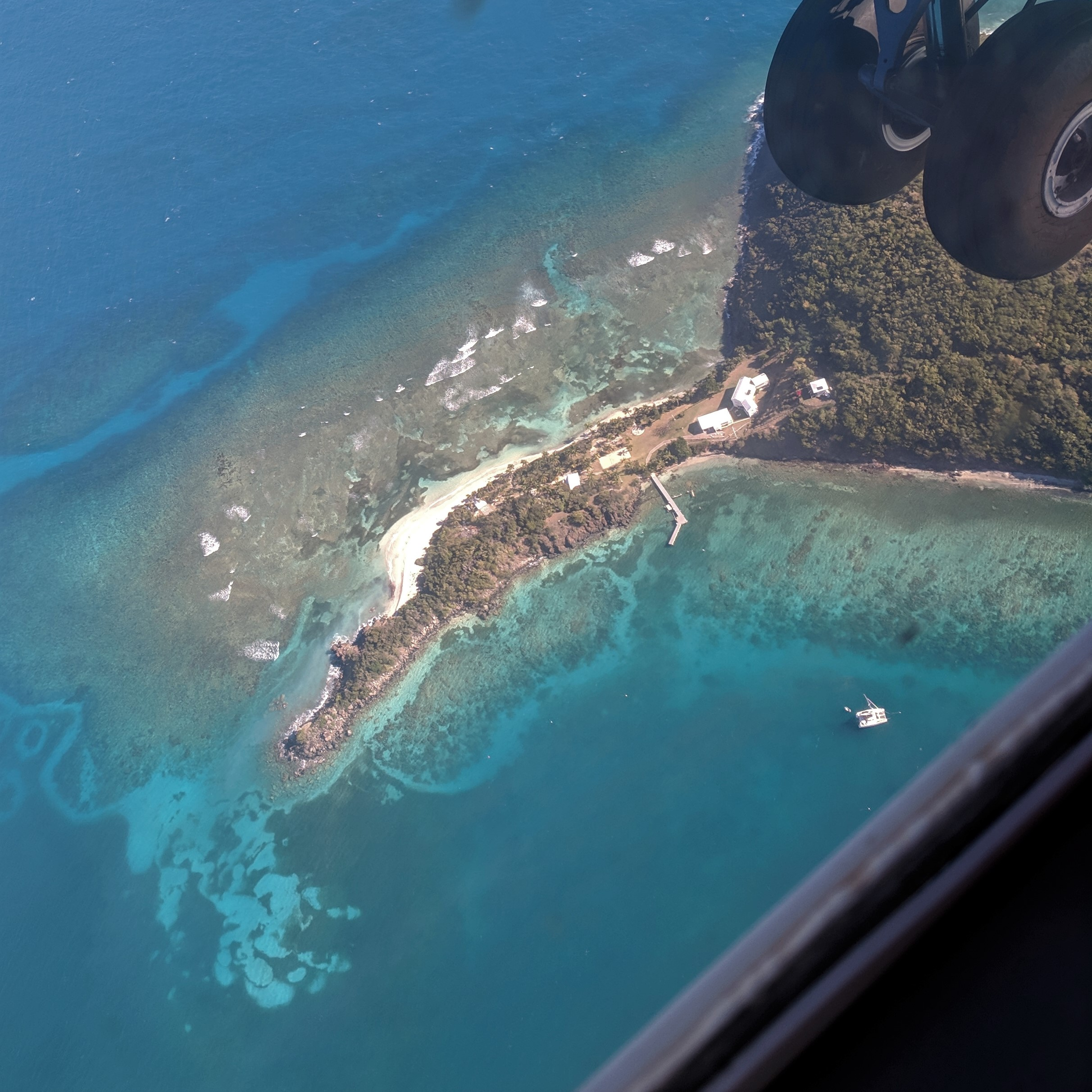
Punta Águila at the western tip of the island

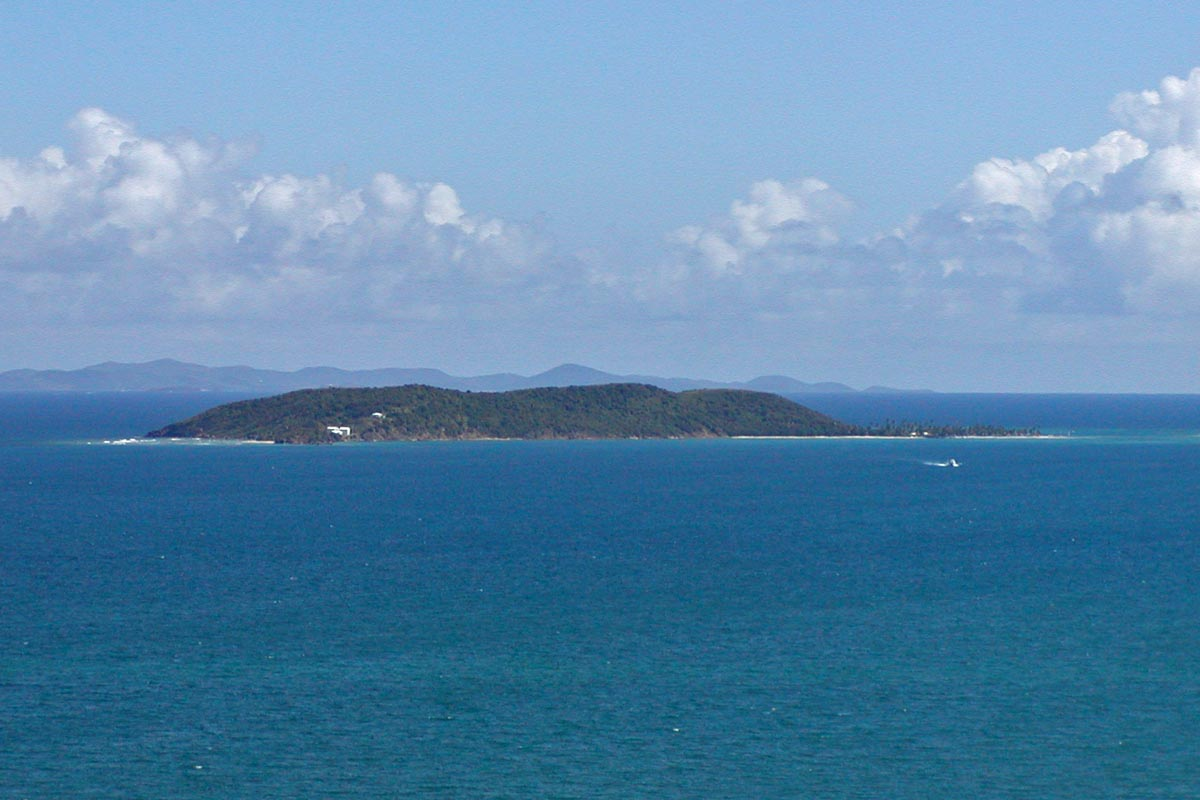
Palominos seen from East, the coast of Fajardo in the background

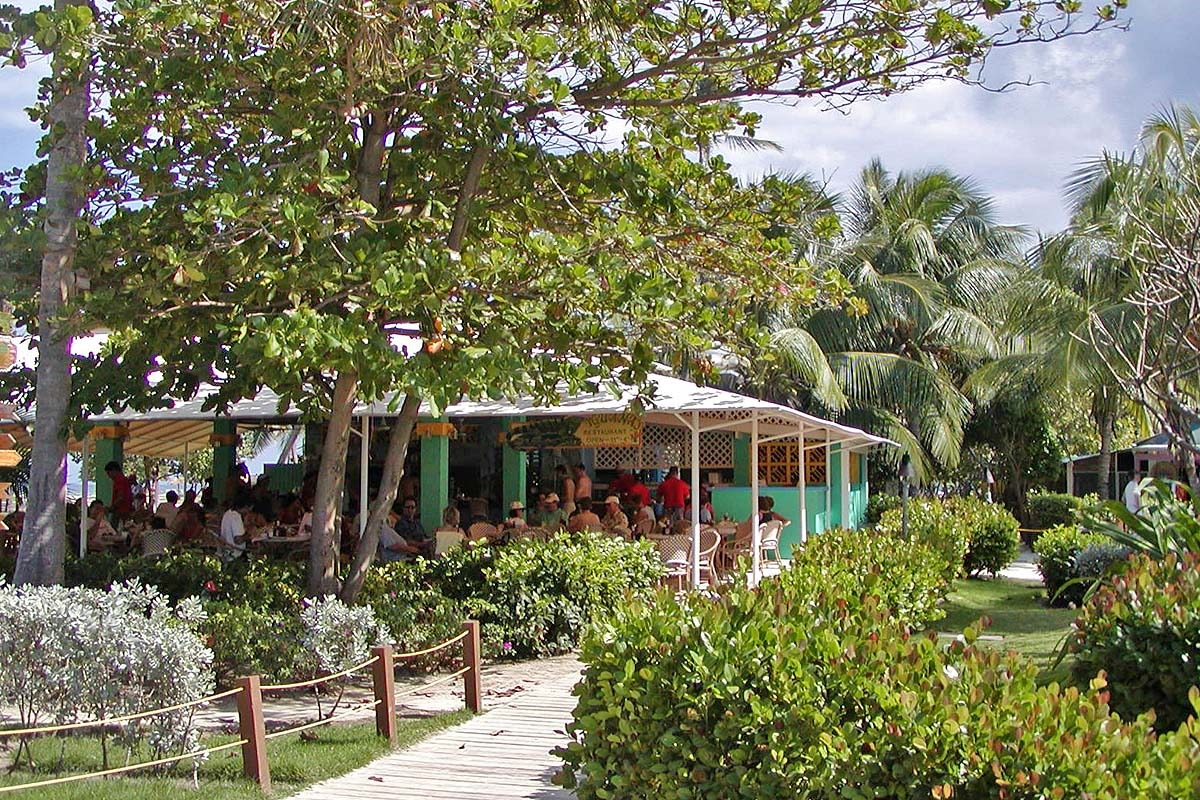
Restaurant in Palominos in 2004

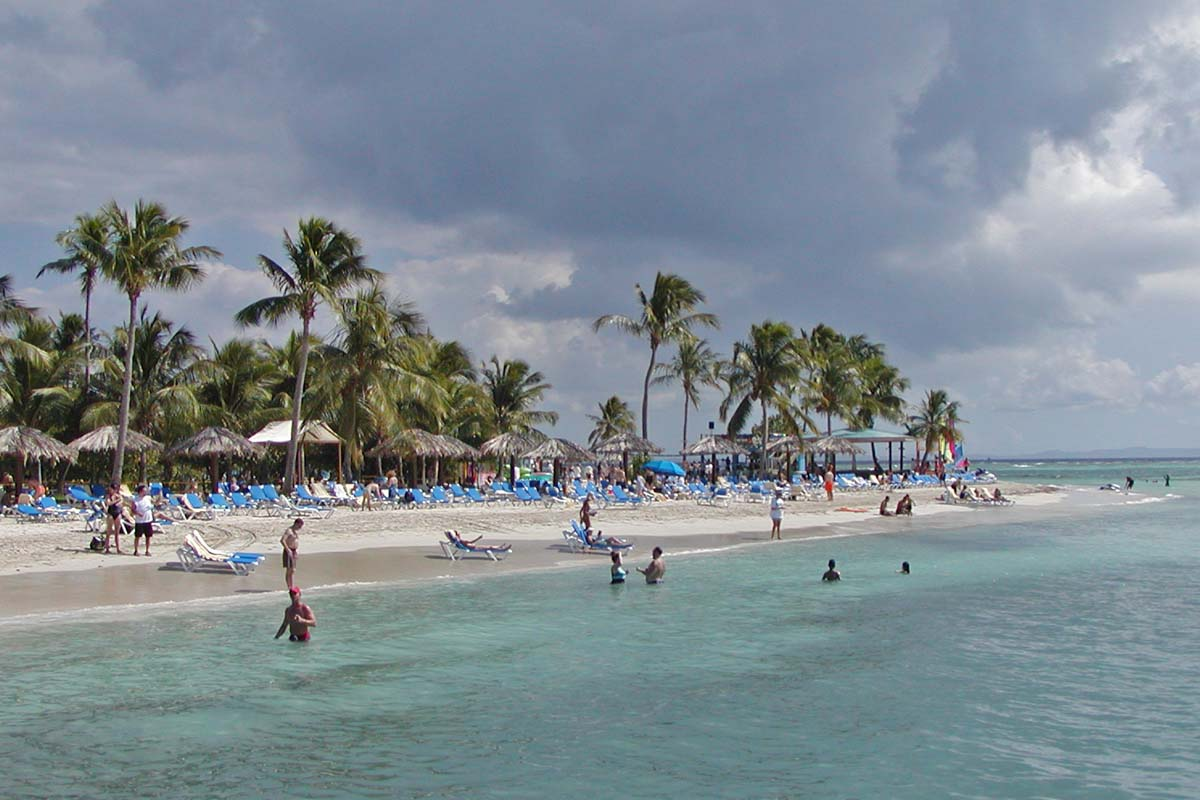
Palominos Beach
