= Icacos Cay =

Uninhabited island of Puerto Rico

Native name: Cayo Icacos
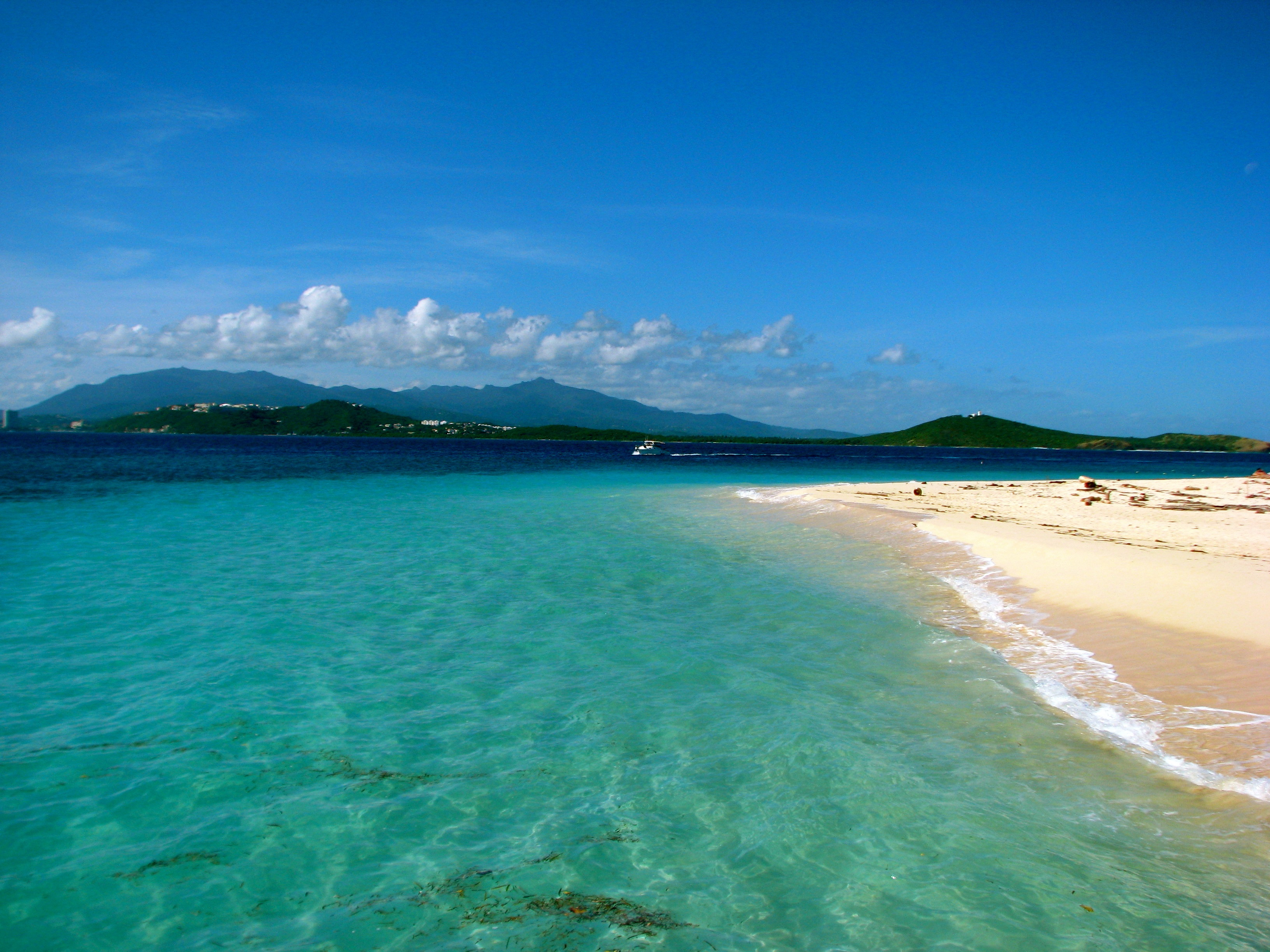
- Beach at Icacos Cay towards Fajardo in northeastern Puerto Rico, 2010

- Location within Puerto Rico Location within Lesser Antilles Location within the Caribbean
- Interactive map

Geography
- Location: Caribbean Sea
- Coordinates: 18°23′11″N 65°35′20″W
- Archipelago: Puerto Rico Archipelago
- Area: 0.659 km^{2} (0.254 sq mi)
- Commonwealth: Puerto Rico
- Municipality: Fajardo
- Barrio: Cabezas

Icacos Cay (Spanish: Cayo Icacos) is the largest uninhabited cay forming part of a small chain of cays, reefs, and skerries located off the coast of the barrio of Cabezas in the municipality of Fajardo in the northeast of the main island of Puerto Rico. Along with Palominos island, it is part of the La Cordillera Reef Nature Reserve, which is under the jurisdiction of the Department of Natural Resources and Environment. Icacos is a fifteen-minute water taxi ride from Fajardo. The cay is a popular snorkeling and beach tourism destination.

For some time, there was a limestone quarry on the southern part of the island, with a short railroad system to shuttle limestone from the quarry to the pier.

== See also ==
- List of islands of Puerto Rico
