= La Cordillera Reef Nature Reserve =

Nature reserve located near Fajardo, Puerto Rico

- Reserva Natural Arrecifes de la Cordillera
- IUCN category V (protected landscape/seascape)
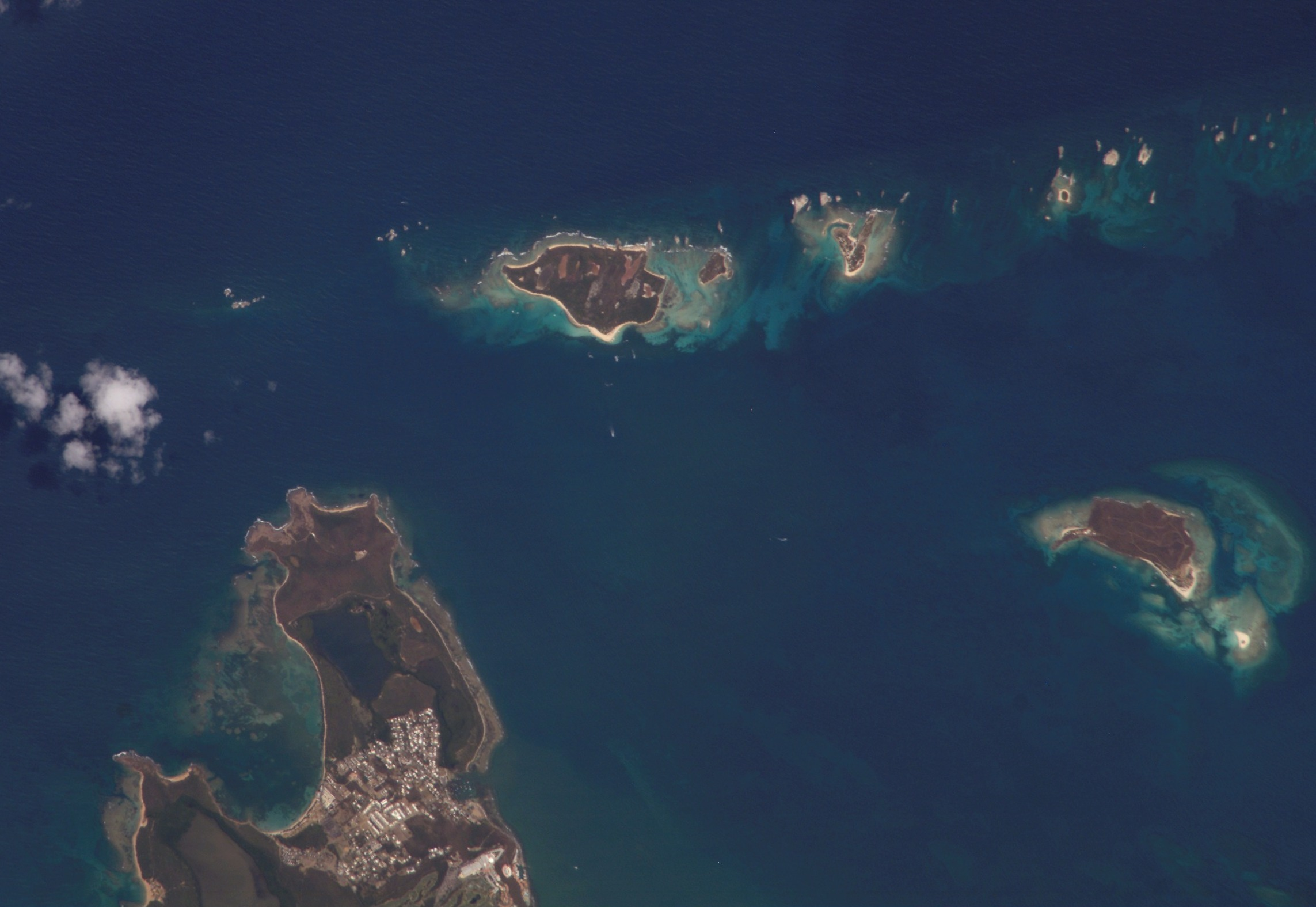
- Satellite view of western half of La Cordillera Reef Nature Reserve, including Icacos Cay (center), Lobos Cay (right-center), La Blanquilla Cay (top right), and Palominos Island (bottom right) off the coast of Las Cabezas de San Juan cape (left) in northeastern Puerto Rico, 2008

- NOAA nautical chart of eastern Puerto Rico with La Cordillera Reef Nature Reserve (upper right) visible, 2016
- Interactive map
- Location: Fajardo, Puerto Rico
- Nearest city: Las Croabas, Fajardo
- Coordinates: 18°22′15″N 65°33′15″W
- Area: 29,653 acres (120.00 km^{2})
- Established: 1978
- Governing body: Puerto Rico Department of Natural and Environmental Resources (DRNA)

The La Cordillera Reef Nature Reserve (Spanish: Reserva Natural Arrecifes de la Cordillera) is a nature reserve consisting of La Cordillera (''the mountain range''), a small chain of cays, reefs, and skerries in the northeast of the archipelago and island of Puerto Rico. Located about 1 mile (0.87 nmi) off the coast of the mainland of the municipality of Fajardo, the reserve extends about 15 miles (13 nmi) and 30,000 acres between Las Cabezas de San Juan cape in Fajardo and the island-municipality of Culebra in the Virgin Islands. From west to east, it comprises Las Cucarachas and Los Farallones skerries, Icacos, Ratones, and Lobos cays, Palominos and Palominitos islands, La Blanquilla and Diablo cays, and Hermanos and Barriles reefs, all of which cover about 218 acres of land.

With the exception of Palominos island and Lobos cay, which are privately owned, all cays, reefs, and skerries in the small chain are protected by the marine reserve. The nature reserve is also important for local fishermen and eastern coastal municipalities, including Fajardo, Ceiba, and Naguabo, which depend on the reserve for their fishing industries.

== History ==
NOAA nautical chart of eastern Puerto Rico with La Cordillera Reef Nature Reserve (center) visible, 2016

Before its preservation, Icacos cay was important for the extraction of limestone for use in the sugarcane industry and construction in Puerto Rico. The conservation area that today encompasses the Cordillera Reef Nature Reserve was first designated on January 2, 1980, by the Coastal Zone Management Plan (Spanish: Plan de Manejo de la Zona Costanera) with the goal of preserving the coral reefs and marine habitats surrounding the Cordillera Cays, a small reef archipelago consisting of cays such as Icacos cay, Ratones cay, Lobos cay, La Blanquilla reef, Diablo cay, and Palomino island. Other protected areas include Los Farallones, Barriles, and Hermanos reefs.

Administration over the nature reserve was transferred to the Puerto Rico Department of Natural and Environmental Resources (DRNA) in 1991. Management plans included the preservation of important bird nesting areas in some of the keys and the establishment of a marine wildlife refuge for the protection of endangered species such as green sea turtles and West Indian manatees. The reserve is considered today a prime eco-tourist destination where visitors can swim along coral reefs and visit the beaches located in some of the cays, particularly Icacos.

Although occasionally included as part of the reserve, the cays and reefs outside the chain that lie immediately next and parallel to the coastline of the main island of Puerto Rico in Fajardo and Ceiba are not strictly protected by the reserve. From north to south, these are: Obispo cay, Zancudo cay, Roncador reef, Mata Caballos reef, Corona Carrilloreef, Ahogado cay, Ramos island, Largo cay, Piñeros island, Cabeza de Perro cay, Piñerito cay, Cabritas cay, and Cabras island.

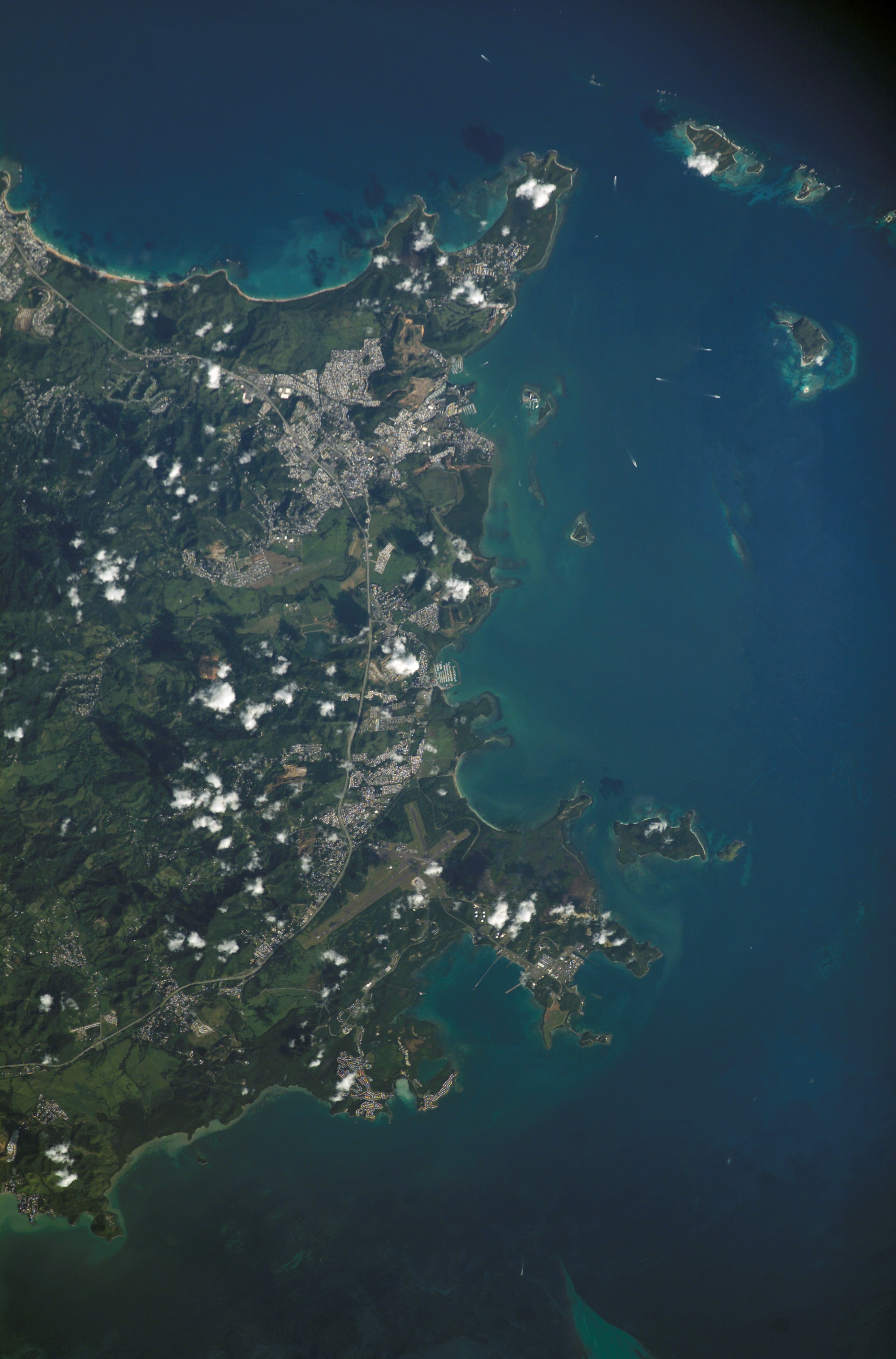
Islands, cays, and reefs off the coasts of Fajardo and Ceiba in northeastern Puerto Rico (those in the far upper right corner are part of the reserve

== Ecology ==
Some of the marine ecosystems found within the reserve are coral reefs, sandy seashores, and extensive seagrass prairies which are important for sea turtles and manatees. La Cordillera Reef is also one of the largest preserved coral areas in the territory of Puerto Rico; the reefs are of high importance due to their high coverage of living coral. The three types of coral reef found in the reserve are rocky reef, consisting of coral growing on aeolianite and cemented sand, barrier reef, consisting of coral growing along keys and coastlines, and patch reef, consisting of patches of coral colonies growing on sandy seafloor. Some of the most common types of coral found in the area are Montastraea, Diploria, Acropora, Colpophyllia and Porites.

=== Fauna ===
There are more than 83 documented fish species in the reserve, 33 of which are of importance for the regional fishing industry. The spiny lobster (Panulirus argus) and the queen conch (Strombus gigas) are also important species for fishing. The reserve also sustains keystone species that are responsible for important ecological processes such as "reef cleaning" which allows for the settlement, development and growth of new coral polyps; one of these keystone species is the black urchin (Diadema antillarum). In addition to the submerged fauna, this reserve is an important bird area with species such as the brown noddy (Anous stolidus), the bridled tern (Sterna anaethetus), the sooty tern (Sterna fuscata), the brown booby (Sula leucogaster), the laughing gull (Larus atricilla) and the roseate tern (Sterna dougalli), all of which are protected on the territorial and federal level. Humpback whales are also common throughout the winter months of December, January and February.

=== Flora ===
The most important flora in the reserve is the seagrass Thalassia testudinum and Syringodium filiforme, which form important seagrass prairies that sustain many marine species such as turtles and manatees. This ecosystem sustains one of the largest manatee populations in the archipelago of Puerto Rico.

== See also ==
- Protected areas of Puerto Rico
