= Cape San Juan Light =

Lighthouse in Fajardo, Puerto Rico

Coordinates: 18°22′52.″N 65°37′5.7″W

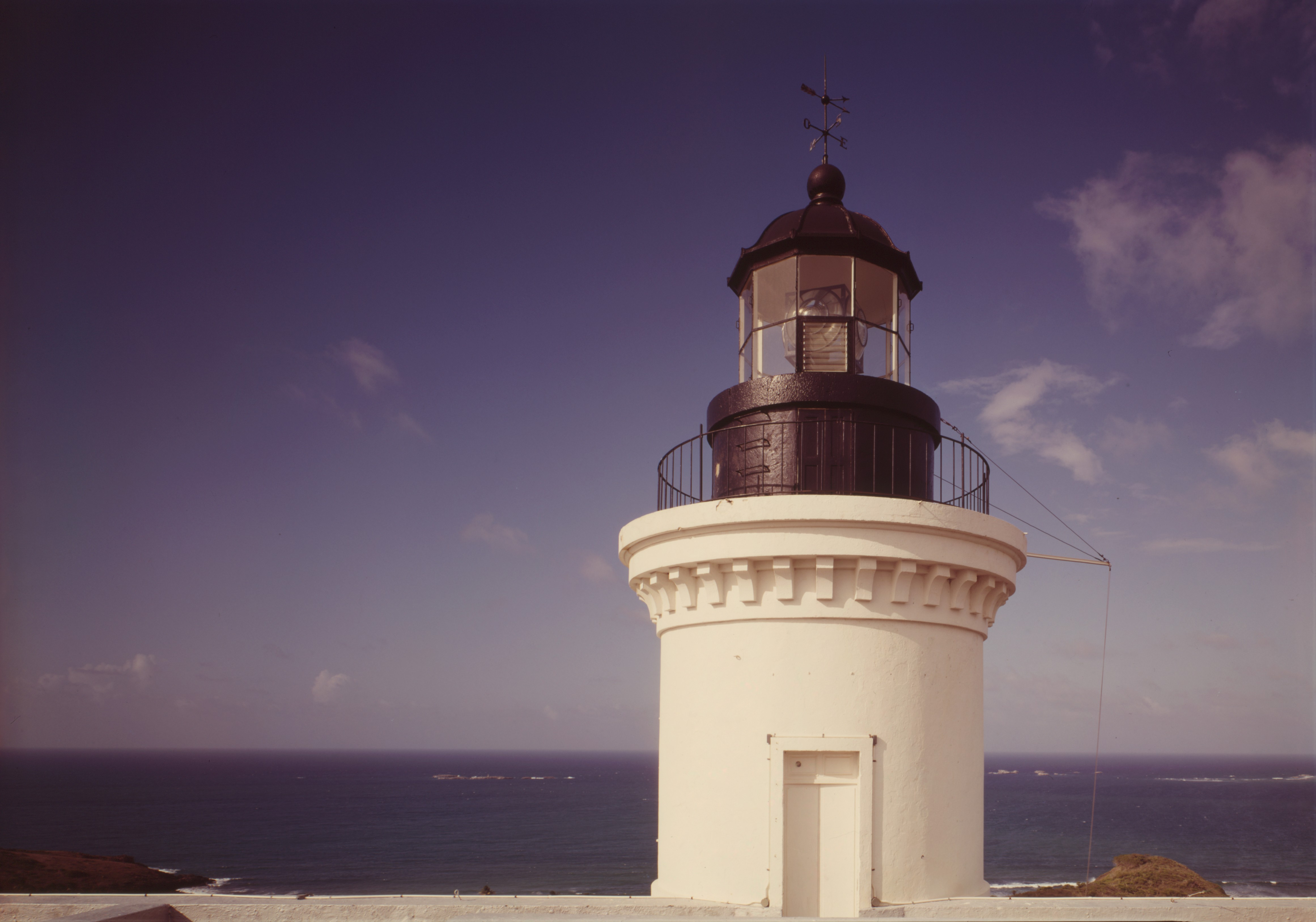
- View from the top of the lighthouse
- Location: Fajardo, Puerto Rico
- Coordinates: 18°22′52.″N 65°37′5.7″W

Tower
- Foundation: stone base
- Construction: stone
- Automated: 1975
- Height: 45 feet (14 m)
- Shape: cylindrical tower with balcony and lantern
- Markings: white tower with black band at the base, black lantern
- Heritage: National Register of Historic Places listed place

Light
- First lit: 1882
- Focal height: 79 m (259 ft)
- Lens: Third order Fresnel
- Range: 26 nmi (48 km; 30 mi)
- Characteristic: Fl W 15s
- Faro de las Cabezas de San Juan
- U.S. National Register of Historic Places
- Puerto Rico Historic Sites and Zones
- Architectural style: Neoclassic
- MPS: Lighthouse System of Puerto Rico TR
- NRHP reference No.: 81000692
- Added to NRHP: October 22, 1981

Cape San Juan Light (Faro de Las Cabezas de San Juan) is a historic lighthouse located on the northeastern part of the highest point of Cape San Juan in Fajardo, Puerto Rico. The lighthouse was constructed in 1880 and was officially lit on May 2, 1882. The original illuminating apparatus, not changed until after 1898, had an 18-mile (29 km) range and displayed a fixed white light which every three minutes flashed red.

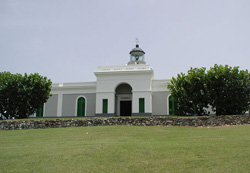
Front of the lighthouse

The lighthouse owned by the Puerto Rico Conservation Trust is part of the Las Cabezas de San Juan Nature Reserve. The 316-acre (128 ha) reserve includes a bioluminescence bay, rare flora and fauna, various trails and boardwalks, and a scientific research center. Despite its small size, the reserve shelters seven different ecological systems, including beaches, lagoons, dry forest, coral reefs and mangroves.

In 1898, the lighthouse played a major role in the Battle of Fajardo during the Puerto Rican Campaign of the Spanish–American War. The lighthouse was listed on the National Register of Historic Places by the United States government on October 22, 1981, and on the Puerto Rico Register of Historic Sites and Zones in 2000.

In 2001, under the National Historic Lighthouse Preservation Act, it became the first lighthouse to be transferred to a non-governmental organization in Puerto Rico.

== Gallery ==
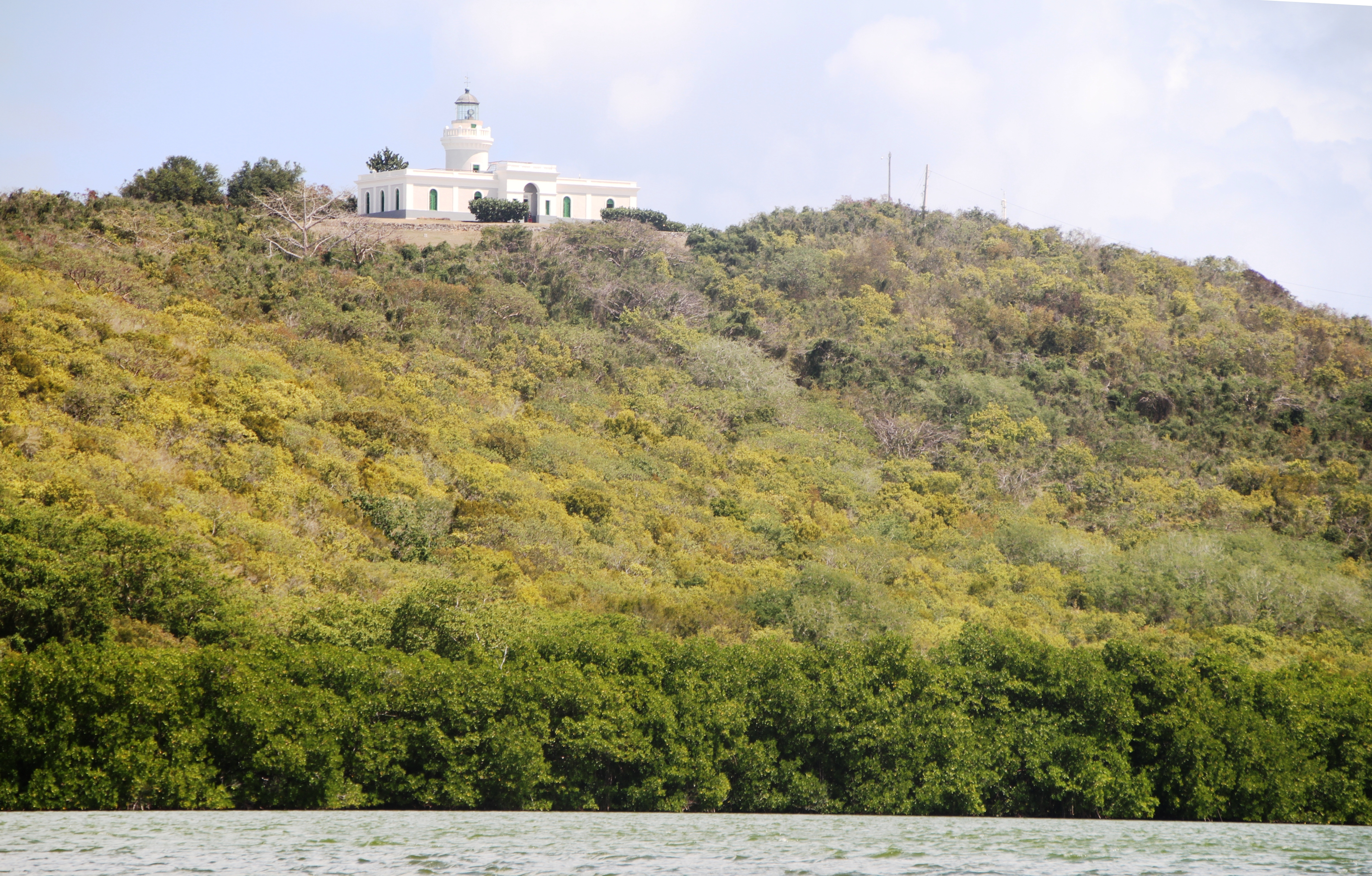

== See also ==
- List of lighthouses in Puerto Rico
