= Demajagua, Fajardo, Puerto Rico =

Barrio of Puerto Rico

Demajagua
- Barrio
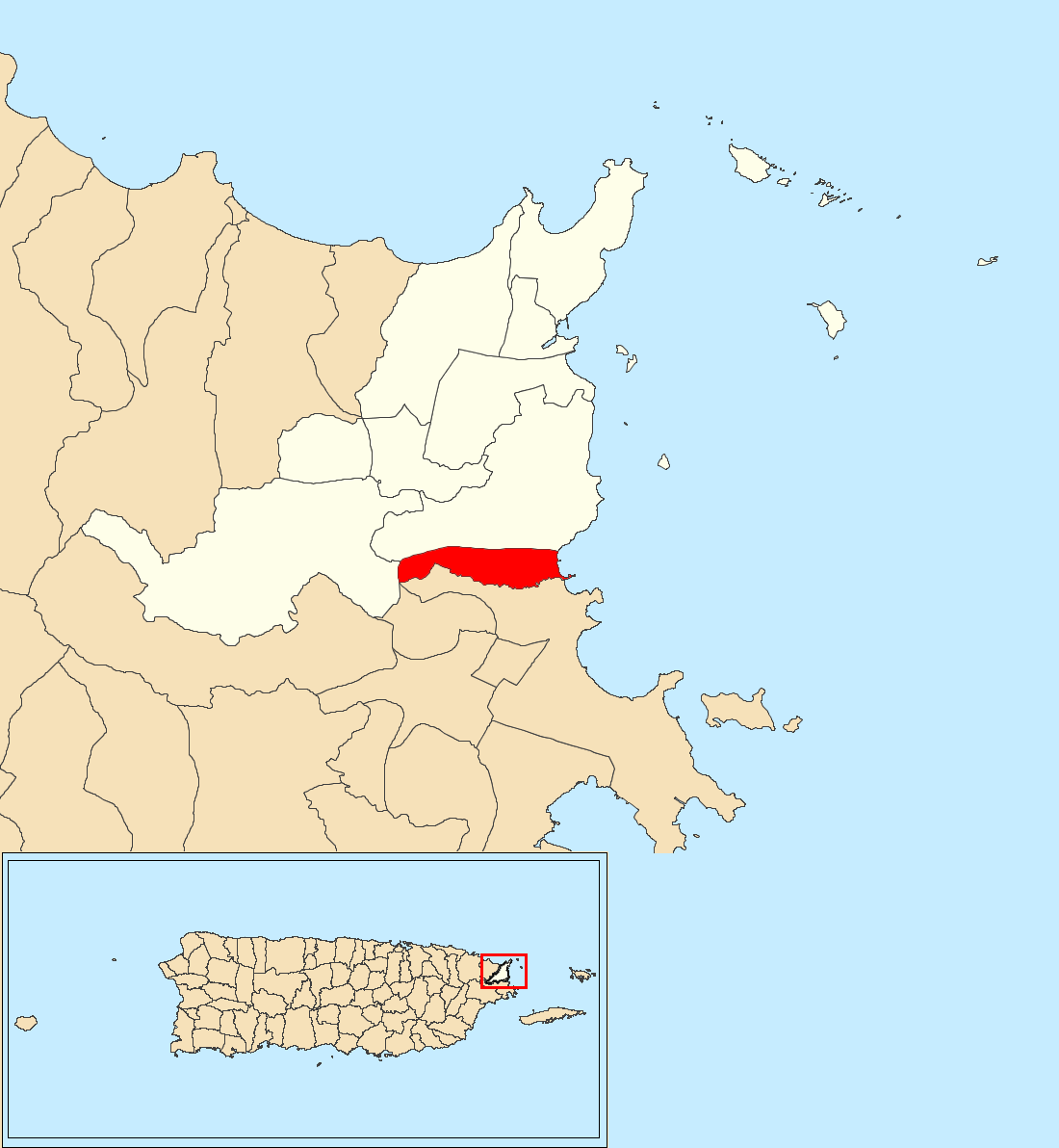
- Location of Demajagua within the municipality of Fajardo shown in red

- Location of Puerto Rico
- Coordinates: 18°17′15″N 65°39′19″W
- Commonwealth: Puerto Rico
- Municipality: Fajardo

Area
  - Total: 1.53 sq mi (4.0 km^{2})
  - Land: 1.33 sq mi (3.4 km^{2})
  - Water: 0.20 sq mi (0.52 km^{2})
- Elevation: 89 ft (27 m)

Population (2010)
  - Total: 1,430
  - Density: 1,075.2/sq mi (415.1/km^{2})
- Source: 2010 Census
- Time zone: UTC−4 (AST)
- ZIP Code: 00738

Demajagua is a barrio in the municipality of Fajardo, Puerto Rico. Its population in 2010 was 1,430.

== History ==
Demajagua was in Spain's gazetteers until Puerto Rico was ceded by Spain in the aftermath of the Spanish–American War under the terms of the Treaty of Paris of 1898 and became an unincorporated territory of the United States. In 1899, the United States Department of War conducted a census of Puerto Rico finding that the combined population of Demajagua and Cabezas barrios was 1,168.

Historical population
Census	Pop.	Note	%±
1910	427		—
1920	407		−4.7%
1930	471		15.7%
1940	472		0.2%
1950	298		−36.9%
1960	271		−9.1%
1970	169		−37.6%
1980	113		−33.1%
1990	299		164.6%
2000	1,094		265.9%
2010	1,430		30.7%
U.S. Decennial Census; 1900 (N/A) 1910-1930; 1930-1950 1980-2000 2010

== See also ==
- List of communities in Puerto Rico
