= Conservation Trust of Puerto Rico =

Non-profit organization protecting natural areas

The Conservation Trust of Puerto Rico (Spanish: Fideicomiso de Conservación de Puerto Rico) is a private, nonprofit organization protecting natural areas; constituting conservation easements; restoring, rehabilitating and preserving historical structures; developing educational programs that foster the protection of natural areas; and directing a tree nursery program for native and endemic species, among others. The Conservation Trust of Puerto Rico has been accredited by The Land Trust Accreditation Commission. The Conservation Trust is also a member of the International Union for Conservation of Nature, a global environmental organization with more than 1,200 public and private members from 160 countries.

It purchased the Inés María Mendoza Nature Reserve in 1975 and the Northern Zone Aquifers in 1977.

In June 2013, the Conservation Trust of Puerto Rico launched its nonprofit unit, Para la Naturaleza. Its goal is to integrate society at large in the conservation of natural ecosystems, in order to increase the amount of protected lands in Puerto Rico, from the actual 8 percent, to 33 percent by the year 2033. The unit groups all of the Trust's educational programming, volunteer and Citizen Science events, and all fundraising initiatives of the organization. Para la Naturaleza also manages all visitor centers and natural areas protected by the Trust, including Hacienda Buena Vista in Ponce, Hacienda La Esperanza in Manatí. The Trust administers the Cabezas de San Juan Light and Nature Reserve located in Fajardo and listed on the US National Register of Historic Places.
