= Cabezas, Fajardo, Puerto Rico =

Barrio of Puerto Rico

Cabezas
- Barrio
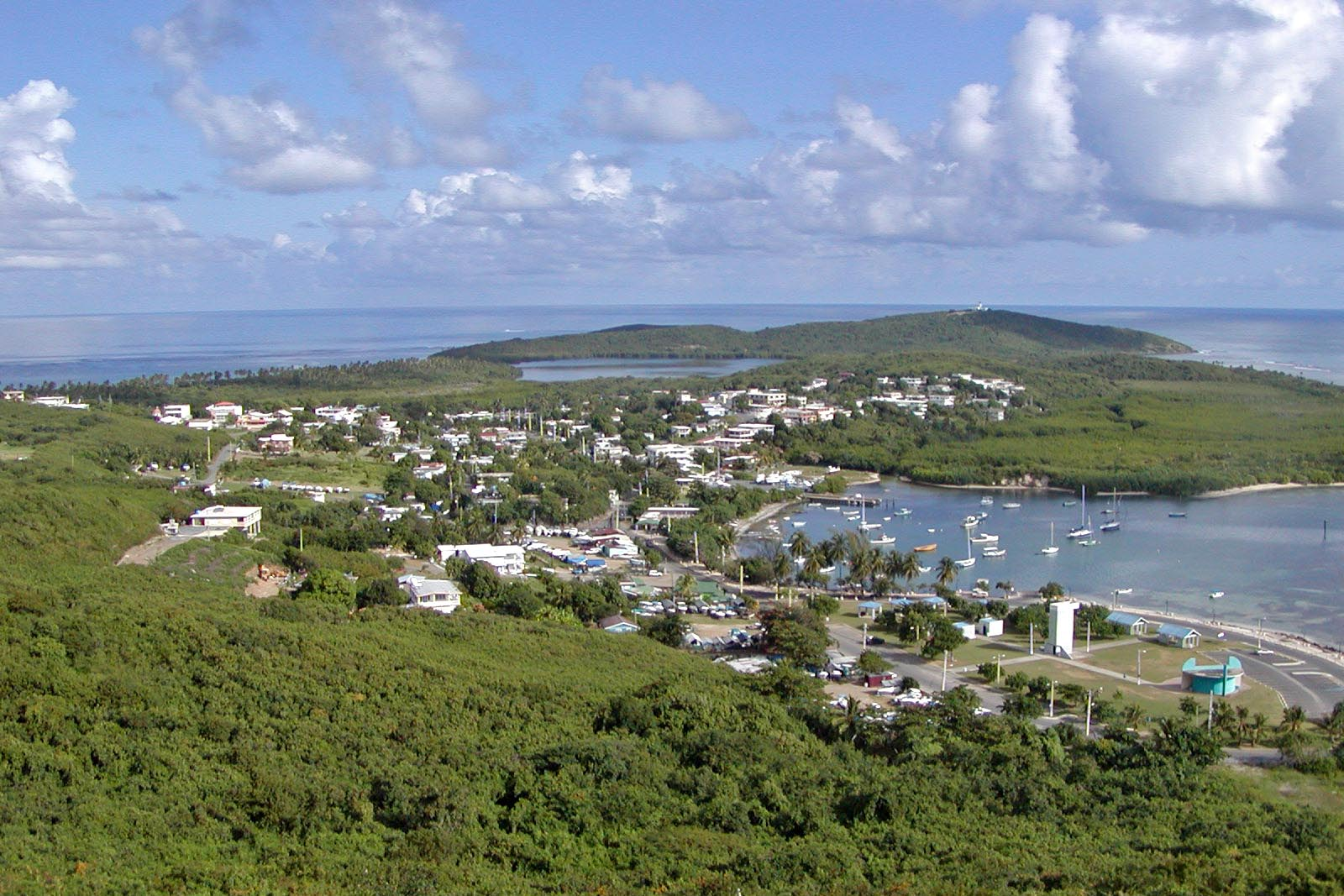
- Las Croabas, Cabezas

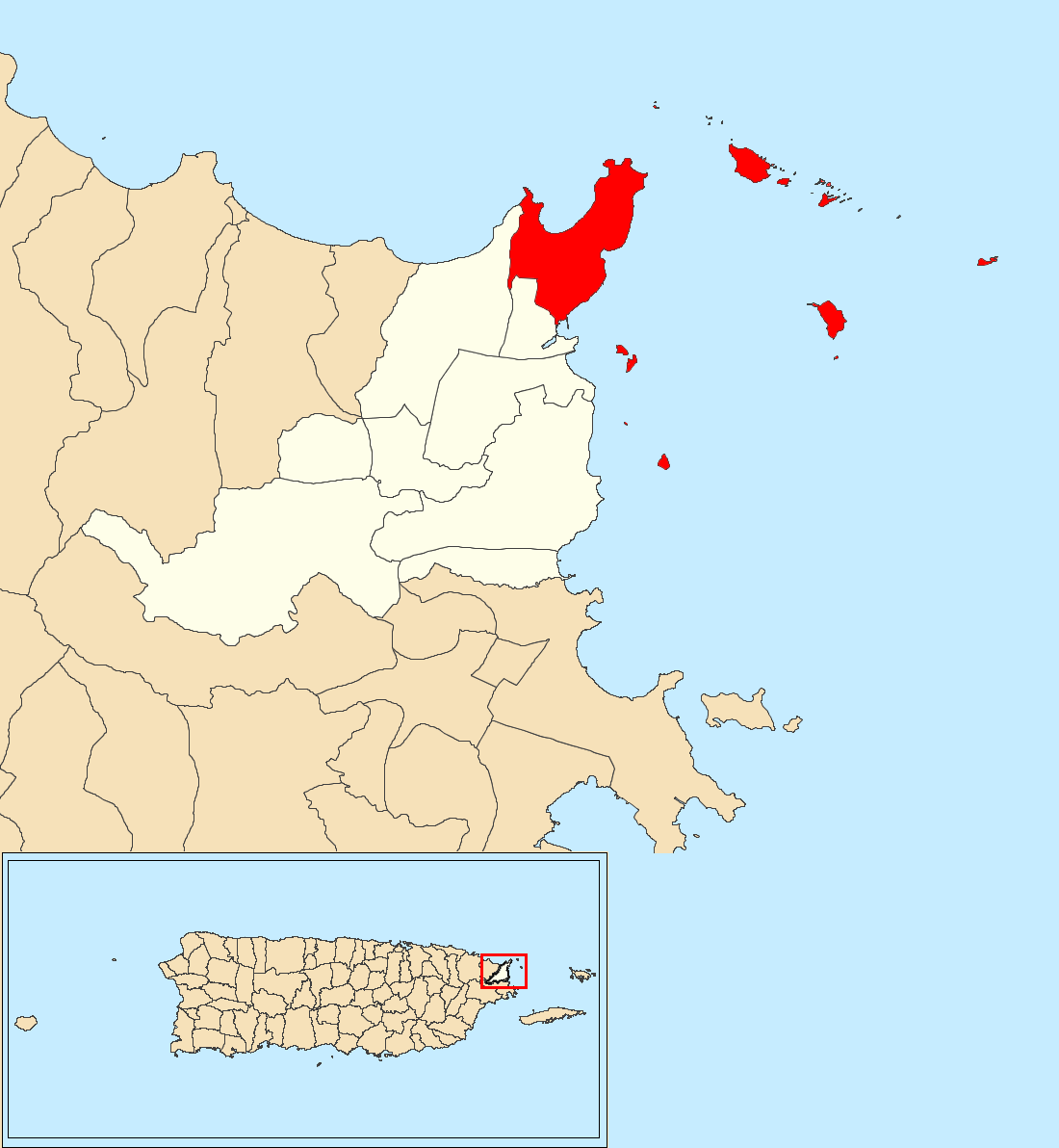
- Location of Cabezas within the municipality of Fajardo shown in red

- Location of Puerto Rico
- Coordinates: 18°23′11″N 65°35′18″W
- Commonwealth: Puerto Rico
- Municipality: Fajardo

Area
  - Total: 73.48 sq mi (190.3 km^{2})
  - Land: 3.01 sq mi (7.8 km^{2})
  - Water: 70.47 sq mi (182.5 km^{2})
- Elevation: 0 ft (0 m)

Population (2010)
  - Total: 1,339
  - Density: 449.3/sq mi (173.5/km^{2})
- Source: 2010 Census
- Time zone: UTC−4 (AST)
- ZIP Code: 00738

Cabezas is a barrio in the municipality of Fajardo, Puerto Rico. Its population in 2010 was 1,339.

Croabas Community with 1,053 residents is a fishing neighborhood and tour boat launch site in Cabezas.

== History ==
Cabezas was in Spain's gazetteers until Puerto Rico was ceded by Spain in the aftermath of the Spanish–American War under the terms of the Treaty of Paris of 1898 and became an unincorporated territory of the United States. In 1899, the United States Department of War conducted a census of Puerto Rico finding that the combined population of Cabezas and Demajagua barrios was 1,168.

Historical population
Census	Pop.	Note	%±
1910	789		—
1920	724		−8.2%
1930	771		6.5%
1940	557		−27.8%
1950	742		33.2%
1960	702		−5.4%
1970	1,031		46.9%
1980	1,216		17.9%
1990	1,211		−0.4%
2000	1,465		21.0%
2010	1,339		−8.6%
U.S. Decennial Census; 1900 (N/A) 1910-1930; 1930-1950 1980-2000 2010

== Gallery ==
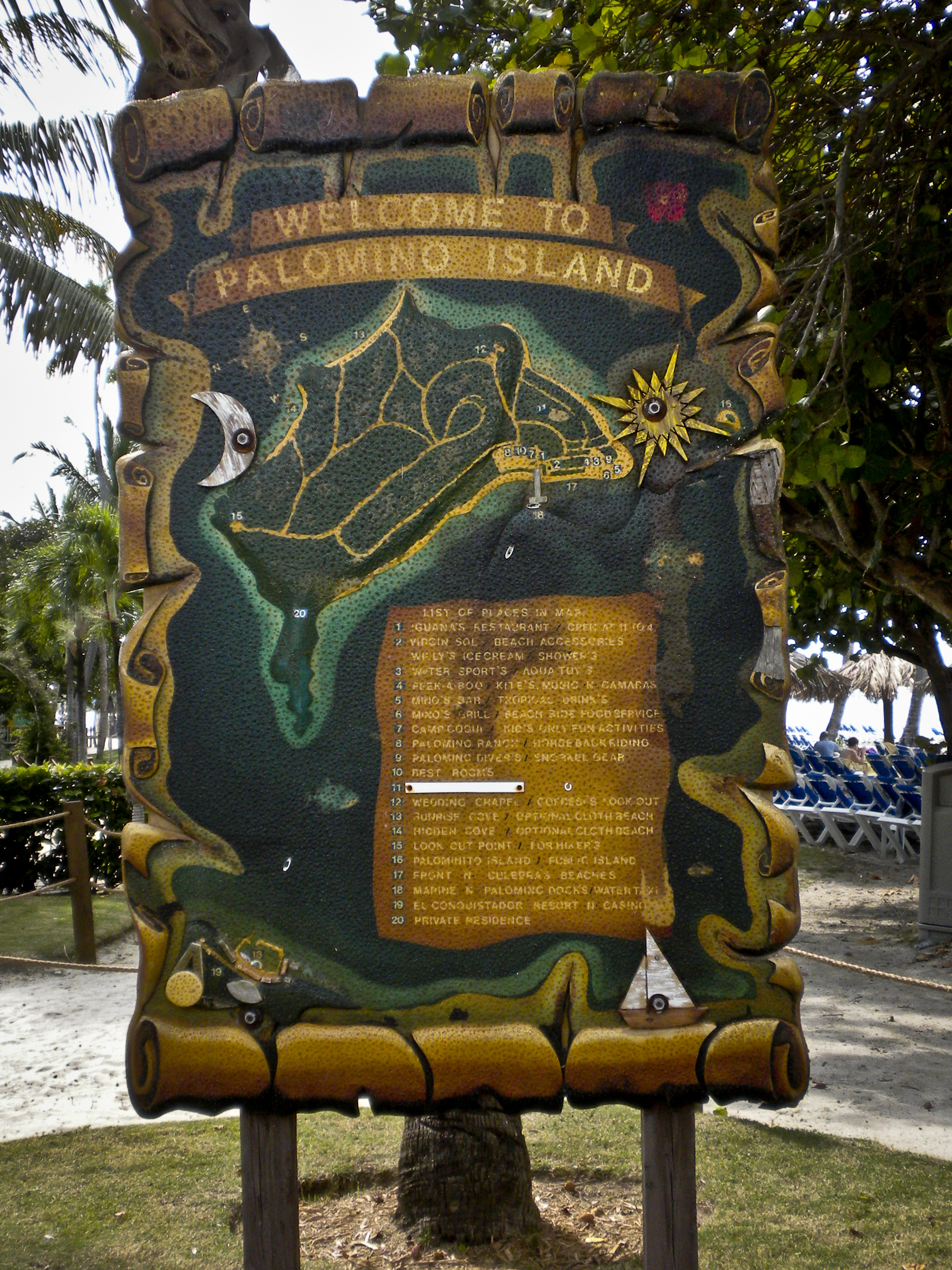
Welcome to Palomino Island in Cabezas

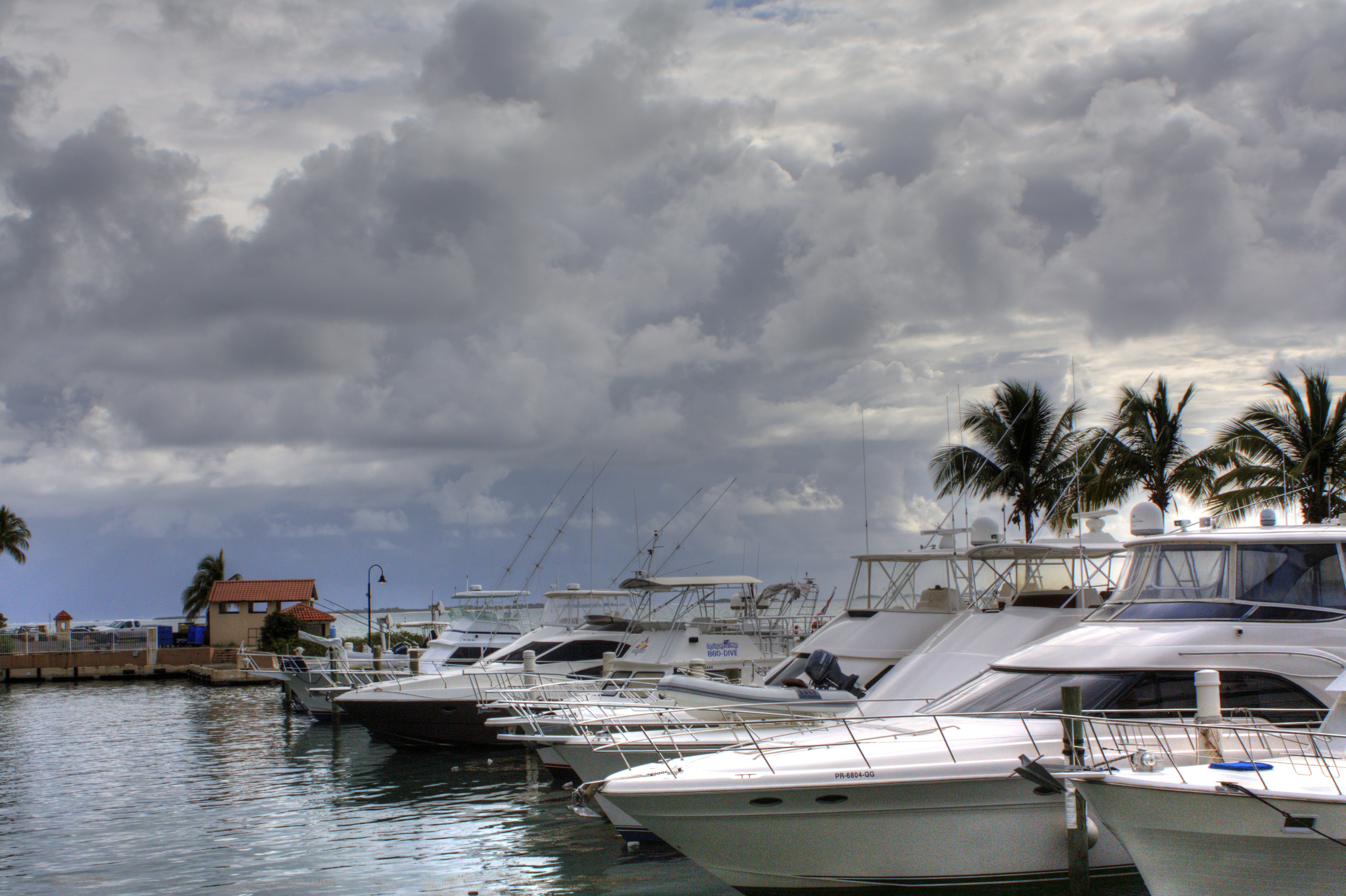
Pier at Cabezas

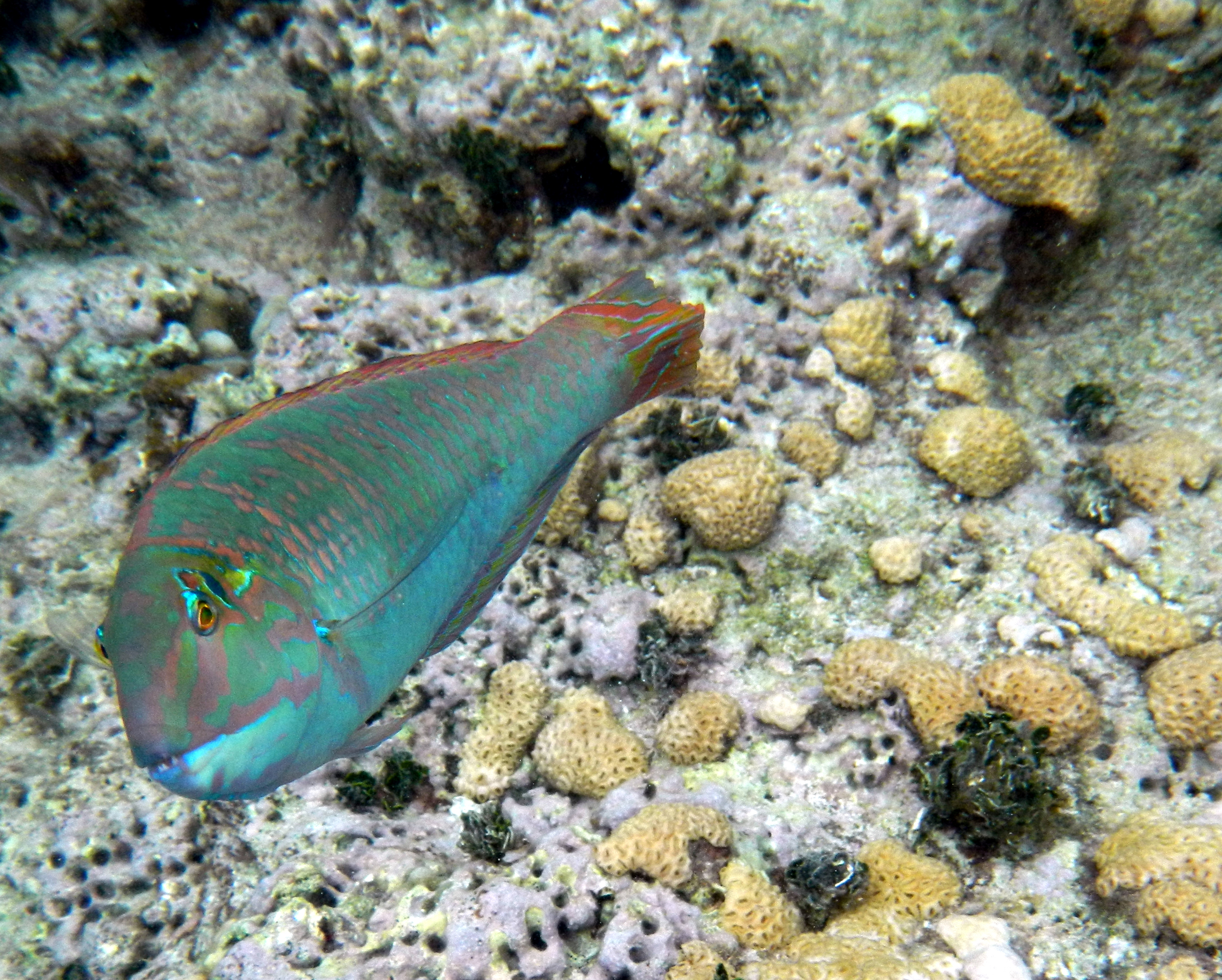
Tropical fish at Cabezas

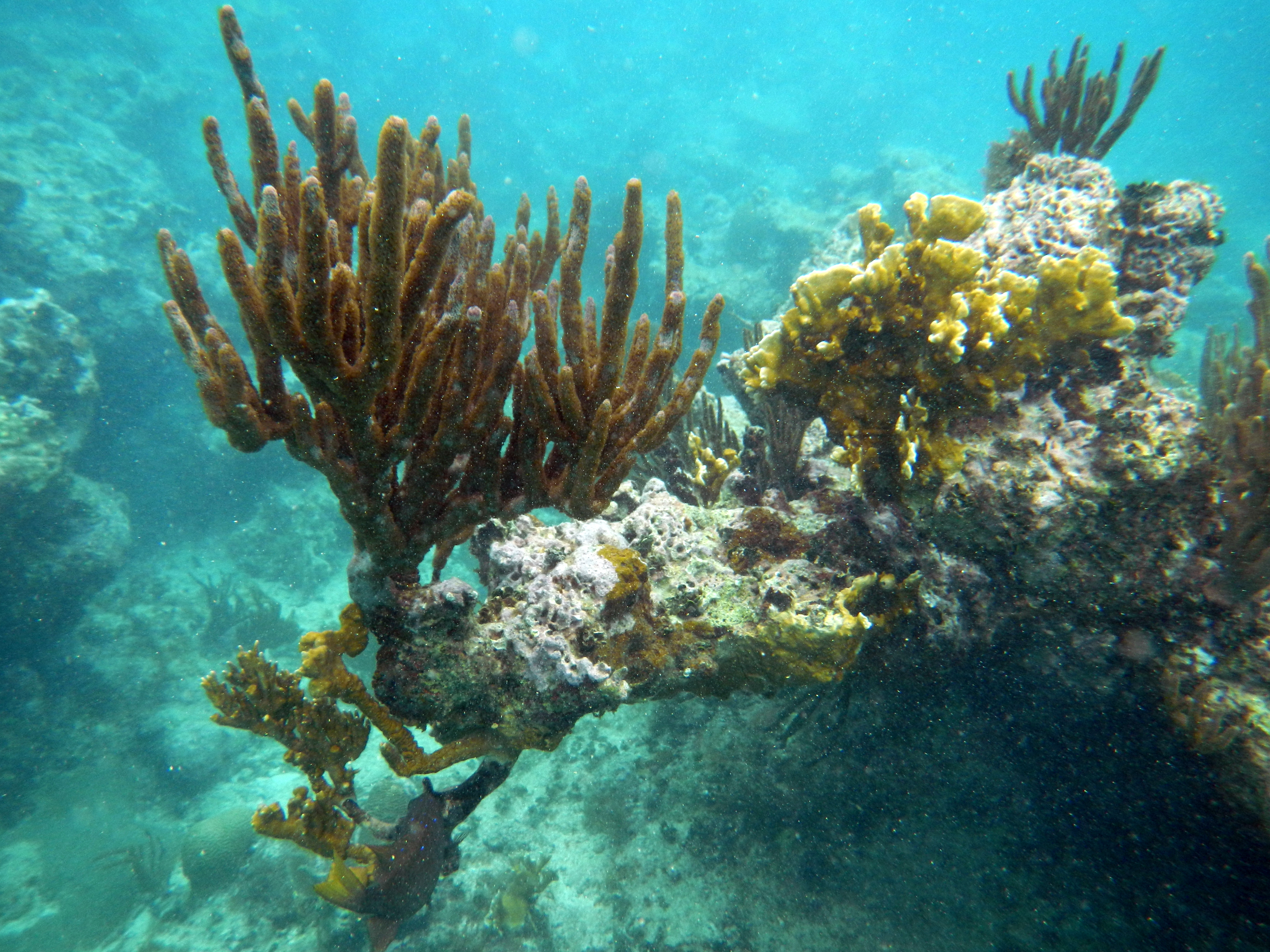
Marine life in Cabezas

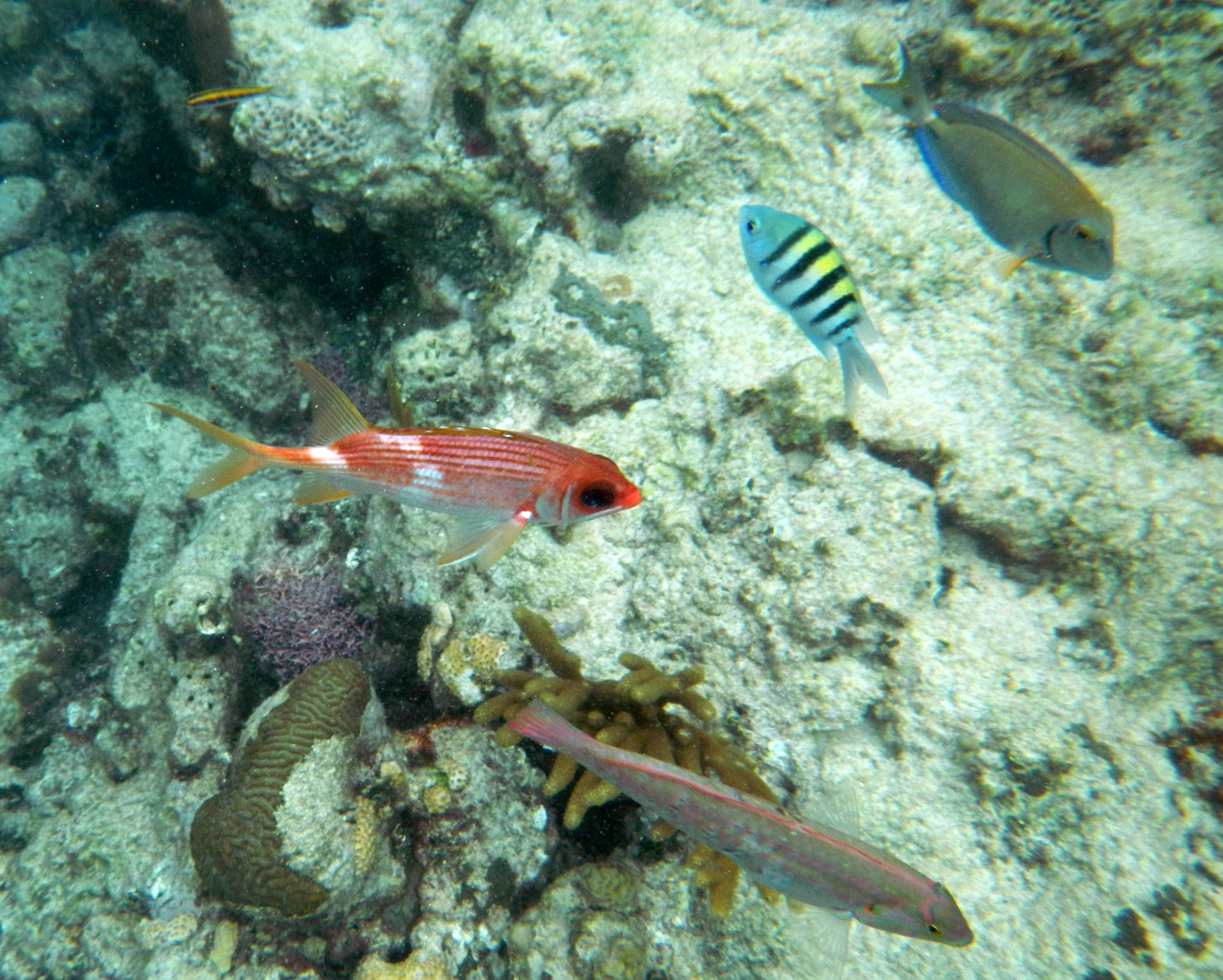
Tropical fish at Cabezas

== See also ==
- List of communities in Puerto Rico
