= Serica paracallosericoides =

Scientific classification
- Kingdom: Animalia
- Phylum: Arthropoda
- Class: Insecta
- Order: Coleoptera
- Suborder: Polyphaga
- Infraorder: Scarabaeiformia
- Family: Scarabaeidae
- Genus: Serica
- Species: S. paracallosericoides

Binomial name
- Serica paracallosericoides Ahrens, Zhao, Pham & Liu, 2024

Species of beetle

Serica paracallosericoides is a species of beetle of the family Scarabaeidae. It is found in China (Fujian).

== Description ==
Adults reach a length of about 8.6–9.5 mm. They have a dark brown, oval and strongly convex body. The elytra are brown with a greenish shine and with darker spots. The antennae are yellow. The dorsal surface is dull, with sparse (but on the pronotum partly dense), short, white setae.

== Etymology ==
The species name is derived from Greek para (meaning near or close to) and the species name callosericoides and refers to its similarity to Serica callosericoides.
