= Calloserica lachungensis =

Scientific classification
- Kingdom: Animalia
- Phylum: Arthropoda
- Class: Insecta
- Order: Coleoptera
- Suborder: Polyphaga
- Infraorder: Scarabaeiformia
- Family: Scarabaeidae
- Genus: Calloserica
- Species: C. lachungensis

Binomial name
- Calloserica lachungensis Ahrens, 2000

Species of beetle

Calloserica lachungensis is a species of beetle of the family Scarabaeidae. It is found in India (Sikkim).

== Description ==
Adults reach a length of about 9.3 mm. They have an oblong body. They are chestnut, with opaque tomentum. The elytral striae are lighter. The labroclypeus is shiny and there are erect hairs on the dorsal surface.

== Etymology ==
The species is named after its type locality, Lachung.
