= Calloserica tigrina =

Scientific classification
- Kingdom: Animalia
- Phylum: Arthropoda
- Class: Insecta
- Order: Coleoptera
- Suborder: Polyphaga
- Infraorder: Scarabaeiformia
- Family: Scarabaeidae
- Genus: Calloserica
- Species: C. tigrina

Binomial name
- Calloserica tigrina Brenske, 1894

Species of beetle

Calloserica tigrina is a species of beetle of the family Scarabaeidae. It is found in India (Sikkim, West Bengal).

== Description ==
Adults reach a length of about 9–10 mm. The frons and vertex are so densely pruinose that the punctures are not visible. Between the dense, short, forward-pointing hairs are some longer hairs and small scales. The elytra are yellowish-brown, darkly streaked with alternating narrow and wider stripes, which are surrounded by scale-like patches formed from very fine white scales.
