= Calloserica trisuliensis =

Scientific classification
- Kingdom: Animalia
- Phylum: Arthropoda
- Class: Insecta
- Order: Coleoptera
- Suborder: Polyphaga
- Infraorder: Scarabaeiformia
- Family: Scarabaeidae
- Genus: Calloserica
- Species: C. trisuliensis

Binomial name
- Calloserica trisuliensis Ahrens, 1999

Species of beetle

Calloserica trisuliensis is a species of beetle of the family Scarabaeidae. It is found in Nepal.

== Description ==
Adults reach a length of about 8.3-8.4 mm. They have a chestnut brown, oblong body, with lighter elytral striae. The dorsal surface is covered with erect hairs.
