= Calloserica delectabilis =

Scientific classification
- Kingdom: Animalia
- Phylum: Arthropoda
- Class: Insecta
- Order: Coleoptera
- Suborder: Polyphaga
- Infraorder: Scarabaeiformia
- Family: Scarabaeidae
- Genus: Calloserica
- Species: C. delectabilis

Binomial name
- Calloserica delectabilis Ahrens, 2000

Species of beetle

Calloserica delectabilis is a species of beetle of the family Scarabaeidae. It is found in Nepal.

== Description ==
Adults reach a length of about 8.1–9.4 mm. They have an oblong body. They are dark green with opaque tomentum, the elytra with brownish striae. There are dense, erect hairs on the dorsal surface.

== Etymology ==
The species name is derived from Latin delectabilis (meaning tasty).
