= Calloserica hingstoni =

Scientific classification
- Kingdom: Animalia
- Phylum: Arthropoda
- Class: Insecta
- Order: Coleoptera
- Suborder: Polyphaga
- Infraorder: Scarabaeiformia
- Family: Scarabaeidae
- Genus: Calloserica
- Species: C. hingstoni

Binomial name
- Calloserica hingstoni Ahrens, 1999

Species of beetle

Calloserica hingstoni is a species of beetle of the family Scarabaeidae. It is found in China (Xizang).

== Description ==
Adults reach a length of about 8.8 mm. They have a chestnut brown, oblong body, with lighter elytral striae. The dorsal surface is covered with erect hairs.

== Etymology ==
The species is named after Major R. W. G. Hingston.
