= Calloserica indrai =

Scientific classification
- Kingdom: Animalia
- Phylum: Arthropoda
- Class: Insecta
- Order: Coleoptera
- Suborder: Polyphaga
- Infraorder: Scarabaeiformia
- Family: Scarabaeidae
- Genus: Calloserica
- Species: C. indrai

Binomial name
- Calloserica indrai Ahrens, 2004

Species of beetle

Calloserica indrai is a species of beetle of the family Scarabaeidae. It is found in eastern Nepal.

== Description ==
Adults reach a length of about 8.8-9.1 mm. They have a dark brown, elongate body, with a greenish shimmer in some areas and lighter elytral stripes. The dorsal surface is dull and densely covered with upright, erect hairs, partly interspersed with short white scales.

== Etymology ==
The species is named for the Hindu god Indra.
