= Calloserica poggii =

Scientific classification
- Kingdom: Animalia
- Phylum: Arthropoda
- Class: Insecta
- Order: Coleoptera
- Suborder: Polyphaga
- Infraorder: Scarabaeiformia
- Family: Scarabaeidae
- Genus: Calloserica
- Species: C. poggii

Binomial name
- Calloserica poggii Ahrens, 1995

Species of beetle

Calloserica poggii is a species of beetle of the family Scarabaeidae. It is found in Nepal.

== Description ==
Adults reach a length of about 9.5 mm. They have a chestnut brown, dull tomentose, elongate body. The forehead and elytral intervals are darker.

== Etymology ==
The species is named after Dr. Roberto Poggi.
