= Calloserica manangensis =

Scientific classification
- Kingdom: Animalia
- Phylum: Arthropoda
- Class: Insecta
- Order: Coleoptera
- Suborder: Polyphaga
- Infraorder: Scarabaeiformia
- Family: Scarabaeidae
- Genus: Calloserica
- Species: C. manangensis

Binomial name
- Calloserica manangensis Ahrens, 2005

Species of beetle

Calloserica manangensis is a species of beetle of the family Scarabaeidae. It is found in Nepal.

== Description ==
Adults reach a length of about 8.2–8.5 mm. They have an oblong body. The surface is dark brown and dull, with the elytral striae lighter. The labroclypeus is shiny and there are erect setae on the dorsal surface. There are groups of minute white scales on the elytra.

== Etymology ==
The species is named after the type locality, the Manang district.
