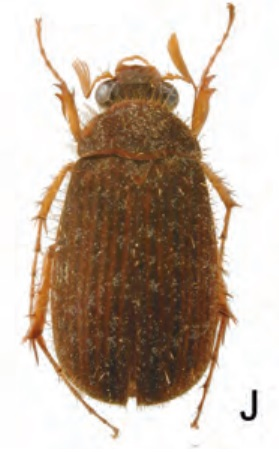

Scientific classification
- Kingdom: Animalia
- Phylum: Arthropoda
- Class: Insecta
- Order: Coleoptera
- Suborder: Polyphaga
- Infraorder: Scarabaeiformia
- Family: Scarabaeidae
- Genus: Calloserica
- Species: C. langtangica

Binomial name
- Calloserica langtangica Ahrens, 1999

= Calloserica langtangica =

Species of beetle

Calloserica langtangica is a species of beetle of the family Scarabaeidae. It is found in central Nepal.

== Description ==
Adults reach a length of about 8.2-9.7 mm. They have a dark green oblong body, the elytra with brownish striae. The dorsal surface is densely covered with erect hairs.
