= Calloserica bertiae =

Scientific classification
- Kingdom: Animalia
- Phylum: Arthropoda
- Class: Insecta
- Order: Coleoptera
- Suborder: Polyphaga
- Infraorder: Scarabaeiformia
- Family: Scarabaeidae
- Genus: Calloserica
- Species: C. bertiae

Binomial name
- Calloserica bertiae Ahrens, 2000

Species of beetle

Calloserica bertiae is a species of beetle of the family Scarabaeidae. It is found in India (Sikkim) and China (Xizang).

== Description ==
Adults reach a length of about 11.1–12.1 mm. They have an oblong body.They are chestnut with opaque tomentum. The elytral striae are lighter. The labroclypeus is shiny and there are erect hairs on the dorsal surface.

== Etymology ==
The species is named after Nicole Berti.
