= Calloserica brendelli =

Scientific classification
- Kingdom: Animalia
- Phylum: Arthropoda
- Class: Insecta
- Order: Coleoptera
- Suborder: Polyphaga
- Infraorder: Scarabaeiformia
- Family: Scarabaeidae
- Genus: Calloserica
- Species: C. brendelli

Binomial name
- Calloserica brendelli Ahrens, 1999

Species of beetle

Calloserica brendelli is a species of beetle of the family Scarabaeidae. It is found in Nepal.

== Description ==
Adults reach a length of about 10 mm. They have a chestnut brown, oblong body, with lighter elytral striae. The dorsal surface is covered with erect hairs.

== Etymology ==
The species is named after the successful Coleoptera collector, Dr. M. J. D. Brendell.
