= Calloserica barabiseana =

Scientific classification
- Kingdom: Animalia
- Phylum: Arthropoda
- Class: Insecta
- Order: Coleoptera
- Suborder: Polyphaga
- Infraorder: Scarabaeiformia
- Family: Scarabaeidae
- Genus: Calloserica
- Species: C. barabiseana

Binomial name
- Calloserica barabiseana Ahrens, 1999

Species of beetle

Calloserica barabiseana is a species of beetle of the family Scarabaeidae. It is found in Nepal.

== Description ==
Adults reach a length of about 7.5 mm. They have a dark green, oblong body, with the elytra almost brownish. The dorsal surface is covered with dense, erect hairs.
