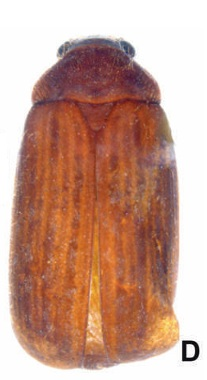

Scientific classification
- Kingdom: Animalia
- Phylum: Arthropoda
- Class: Insecta
- Order: Coleoptera
- Suborder: Polyphaga
- Infraorder: Scarabaeiformia
- Family: Scarabaeidae
- Genus: Calloserica
- Species: C. zhangmuensis

Binomial name
- Calloserica zhangmuensis Liu & Ahrens, 2014

= Calloserica zhangmuensis =

Species of beetle

Calloserica zhangmuensis is a species of beetle of the family Scarabaeidae. It is found in China (Xizang).

== Description ==
Adults reach a length of about 7.4–8.9 mm. They have a dull, oblong body. The dorsal surface, ventral surface and legs are reddish brown, and the elytral intervals, head and pronotum are darker. The dorsal surface has moderately long and very dense setae being directed anteriorly, with a few longer erect setae on the head and pronotum, the even intervals with large spots composed of minute white, scale-like setae.

== Etymology ==
The species is named after the type locality, Zhangmu.
