= Calloserica rupthangensis =

Scientific classification
- Kingdom: Animalia
- Phylum: Arthropoda
- Class: Insecta
- Order: Coleoptera
- Suborder: Polyphaga
- Infraorder: Scarabaeiformia
- Family: Scarabaeidae
- Genus: Calloserica
- Species: C. rupthangensis

Binomial name
- Calloserica rupthangensis Ahrens, 2004

Species of beetle

Calloserica rupthangensis is a species of beetle of the family Scarabaeidae. It is found in eastern central Nepal.

== Description ==
Adults reach a length of about 8.4-8.6 mm. They have a dark brown, oblong body, with a greenish shimmer in some areas. The dorsal surface is dull and densely covered with upright hairs, partly interspersed with short white scales.

== Etymology ==
The species is named for the type locality, Rupthang.
