= Calloserica cambeforti =

Scientific classification
- Kingdom: Animalia
- Phylum: Arthropoda
- Class: Insecta
- Order: Coleoptera
- Suborder: Polyphaga
- Infraorder: Scarabaeiformia
- Family: Scarabaeidae
- Genus: Calloserica
- Species: C. cambeforti

Binomial name
- Calloserica cambeforti Ahrens, 2000

Species of beetle

Calloserica cambeforti is a species of beetle of the family Scarabaeidae. It is found in India (Sikkim).

== Description ==
Adults reach a length of about 9.3 mm. They have an slender and oblong body. They are chestnut with opaque toment. The elytral striae are lighter. The labroclypeus is shiny and there are erect hairs on the dorsal surface.

== Etymology ==
The species is named after Prof. Y. Cambefort.
