= Calloserica =

Scientific classification
- Kingdom: Animalia
- Phylum: Arthropoda
- Clade: Pancrustacea
- Class: Insecta
- Order: Coleoptera
- Suborder: Polyphaga
- Infraorder: Scarabaeiformia
- Family: Scarabaeidae
- Subfamily: Sericinae
- Tribe: Sericini
- Genus: Calloserica; Brenske, 1894

Genus of leaf beetles

Calloserica is a genus of beetles belonging to the family Scarabaeidae.

== Species ==
- Calloserica autumnalis Ahrens, 1999
- Calloserica barabiseana Ahrens, 1999
- Calloserica begnasia Ahrens, 1999
- Calloserica bertiae Ahrens, 2000
- Calloserica brendelli Ahrens, 1999
- Calloserica cambeforti Ahrens, 2000
- Calloserica capillata Ahrens, 2005
- Calloserica chiplingensis Ahrens, 1999
- Calloserica delectabilis Ahrens, 2000
- Calloserica gosainkundensis Ahrens, 1999
- Calloserica hingstoni Ahrens, 1999
- Calloserica indrai Ahrens, 2004
- Calloserica lachungensis Ahrens, 2000
- Calloserica langtangica Ahrens, 1999
- Calloserica manangensis Ahrens, 2005
- Calloserica poggii Ahrens, 1995
- Calloserica raksensis Ahrens, 2004
- Calloserica rupthangensis Ahrens, 2004
- Calloserica tigrina Brenske, 1894
- Calloserica trisuliensis Ahrens, 1999
- Calloserica zhangmuensis Liu & Ahrens, 2014
